= South Gloucestershire Council elections =

Local authority in South Gloucestershire, England

South Gloucestershire Council is the local authority for the unitary authority of South Gloucestershire, England. It was created on 1 April 1996, covering the area of the abolished Kingswood and Northavon districts, and also taking on the services previously provided by the former Avon County Council in the area.

== Election results ==
Composition of the council
Year	Conservative	Labour	Liberal Democrats (Note: Includes totals for the predecessors of the Liberal Democrats, the Liberal Party and SDP (both of which participated in the Alliance).)	Independents & Others	Council control after election
Council established from the merger of Kingswood and Northavon (70 seats)
1995	8	31	30	1	No overall control
New ward boundaries (70 seats)
1999	8	25	37	0	Liberal Democrats
2003	21	16	33	0	No overall control
New ward boundaries (70 seats)
2007	34	9	27	0	No overall control
2011	34	15	21	0	No overall control
2015	40	14	16	0	Conservative
New ward boundaries (61 seats)
2019	33	11	17	0	Conservative
2023	23	17	20	1	No overall control

== Results maps ==
2003 results map

2007 results map

2011 results map

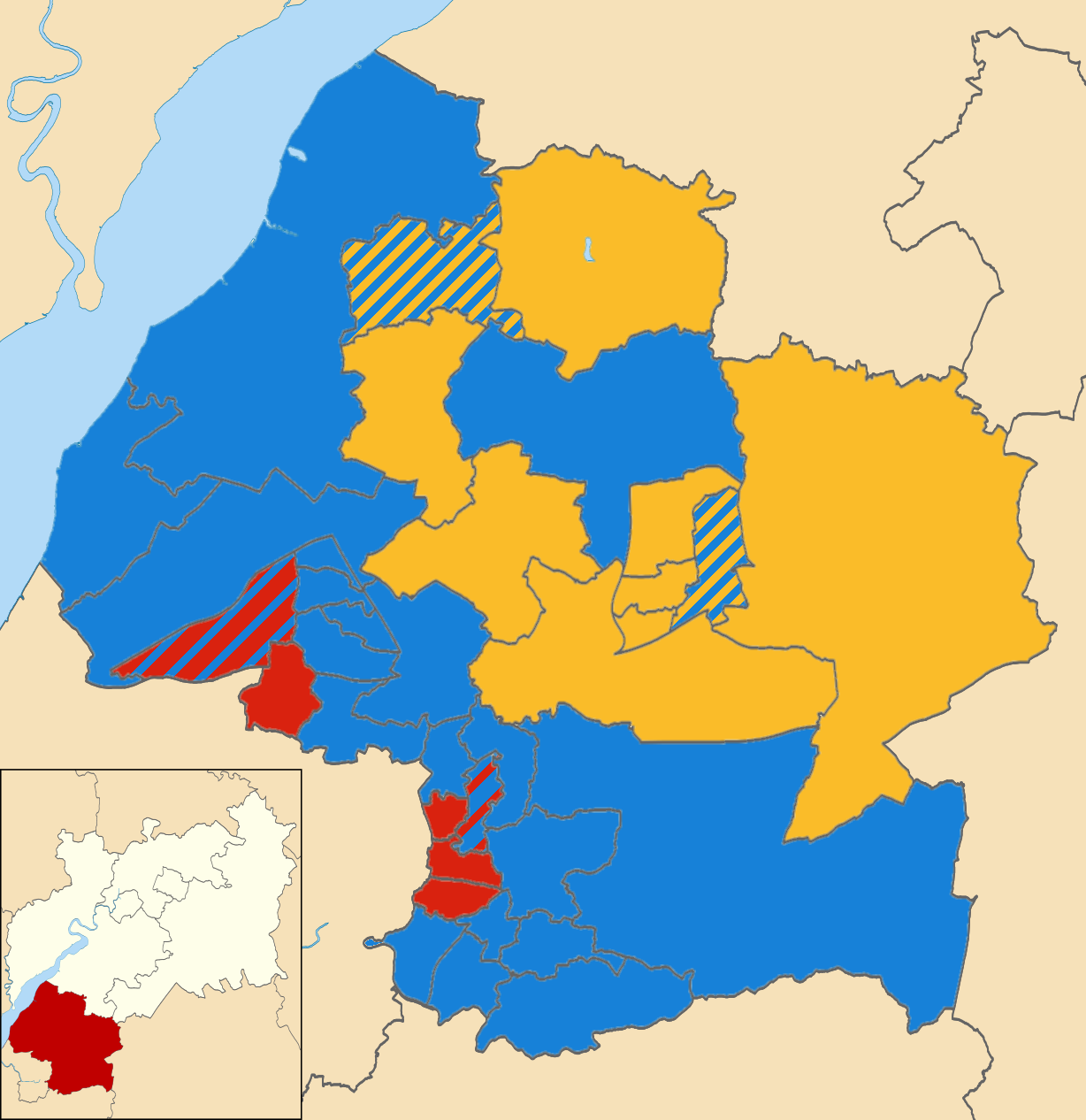
2015 results map

2019 results map

2023 results map

== By-election results ==
=== 1995–1999 ===
Parkwell By-Election 13 February 1997
Party	Candidate	Votes	%	±%
Labour		1,357	54.5	
Liberal Democrats		570	22.9	
Conservative		561	22.5	
Majority		787	31.6	
Turnout		2,488	29.4	
Labour hold		Swing		

=== 1999–2003 ===
Boyd Valley By-Election 8 July 1999
Party	Candidate	Votes	%	±%
Conservative		1,061	48.1	+14.2
Labour		768	34.8	+2.7
Liberal Democrats		379	17.2	−16.8
Majority		293	13.3	
Turnout		2,208	39.7	
Conservative hold		Swing		

Yate West By-Election 27 January 2000
Party	Candidate	Votes	%	±%
Liberal Democrats		575	63.2	+1.8
Conservative		194	21.3	+8.7
Labour		141	15.5	−10.5
Majority		381	41.9	
Turnout		910	17.9	
Liberal Democrats hold		Swing		

Stoke Gifford By-Election 4 May 2000 (2)
Party	Candidate	Votes	%	±%
Conservative		1,220		
Conservative		1,127		
Liberal Democrats		797		
Liberal Democrats		787		
Labour		734		
Labour		681		
Turnout		5,346	33.7	
Conservative gain from Labour		Swing		
Conservative gain from Labour		Swing		

Bradley Stoke Bailey's Court By-Election 6 September 2001
Party	Candidate	Votes	%	±%
Liberal Democrats		430	51.7	−6.2
Conservative		273	32.8	+7.9
Labour		129	15.5	−1.7
Majority		157	18.9	
Turnout		832	27.1	
Liberal Democrats hold		Swing		

King's Chase By-Election 11 July 2002
Party	Candidate	Votes	%	±%
Labour		1,303	55.0	−9.8
Conservative		770	32.5	+13.1
Liberal Democrats		294	12.4	−3.4
Majority		533	22.5	
Turnout		2,367	29.3	
Labour hold		Swing		

=== 2003–2007 ===
Bradley Stoke Baileys Court By-Election 22 April 2004
Party	Candidate	Votes	%	±%
Liberal Democrats		487	44.8	−8.5
Conservative		458	42.1	+13.2
Labour		142	13.1	−4.7
Majority		29	2.7	
Turnout		1,087	34.6	
Liberal Democrats hold		Swing		

Longwell Green By-Election 9 September 2004
Party	Candidate	Votes	%	±%
Conservative		1,036	56.6	−6.9
Liberal Democrats		422	23.0	+9.1
Labour		373	20.4	−2.1
Majority		614	33.6	
Turnout		1,831	31.7	
Conservative hold		Swing		

=== 2007–2011 ===
Frampton Cotterell By-Election 24 May 2007
Party	Candidate	Votes	%	±%
Liberal Democrats	Dave Hockey	1,624		
Liberal Democrats	Pat Hockey	1,546		
Conservative	John Farbrother	1,179		
Conservative	Sarah Kitching	1,165		
Labour	Terry Trollope	225		
Labour	Ray Bazeley	162		
Turnout		5,901	54.0	
Liberal Democrats hold		Swing		

=== 2011–2015 ===
Dodington By-Election 6 September 2012
Party	Candidate	Votes	%	±%
Liberal Democrats	Tony Davis	787	56.9	−7.3
Labour	Michael McGrath	243	17.6	+3.5
UKIP	Aaron Foot	213	15.4	+15.4
Conservative	Kate Duffy	139	10.1	−11.6
Majority		544	39.4	
Turnout		1,382		
Liberal Democrats hold		Swing		

=== 2015–2019 ===
Winterbourne By-Election 22 June 2017
Party	Candidate	Votes	%	±%
Conservative	Nic Labuschagne	873	47.9	+1.5
Labour	George Angus	615	33.8	+18.6
Liberal Democrats	Peter Bruce	333	18.3	−3.8
Majority		258	14.2	
Turnout		1,821		
Conservative hold		Swing		

Dodington By-Election 1 November 2018
Party	Candidate	Votes	%	±%
Liberal Democrats	Louise Harris	693	49.0	+8.1
Conservative	Ian Livermore	564	39.9	+17.3
Labour	John Malone	158	11.2	−1.6
Majority		129	9.1	
Turnout		1,415		
Liberal Democrats hold		Swing		

=== 2019–2023 ===
Frenchay and Downend By-Election 6 May 2021
Party	Candidate	Votes	%	±%
Conservative	Liz Brennan	1,819	37.8	−6.5
Liberal Democrats	Raj Sood	1,598	33.2	+13.0
Labour	Sean Rhodes	1,049	21.8	−3.0
Green	Oliver Owen	347	7.2	+7.2
Majority		221	4.6	
Turnout		4,813		
Conservative hold		Swing		

=== 2023–2027 ===
New Cheltenham By-Election 2 May 2024
Party	Candidate	Votes	%	±%
Labour	Angela Morey	666	48.2	−3.7
Conservative	Kelly Cole	418	30.2	−6.6
Green	AJ Coakham	189	13.7	+13.7
Liberal Democrats	James Corrigan	109	7.9	−3.4
Majority		248	17.9	
Turnout		1,382		
Labour hold		Swing		

Kingswood By-Election 4 July 2024
Party	Candidate	Votes	%	±%
Labour	Julie Snelling	1,911	55.1	−2.2
Conservative	Gagan Singh	792	22.8	−7.0
Liberal Democrats	James Corrigan	590	17.0	+4.2
TUSC	Amy Sage	178	5.1	+5.1
Majority		1,119	32.2	
Turnout		3,471		
Labour hold		Swing		

Frampton Cotterell By-Election 28 November 2024
Party	Candidate	Votes	%	±%
Liberal Democrats	David Goodwin	1,315	49.3	−2.4
Conservative	Tim Niblett	1,114	41.7	+8.1
Green	Alan Lankester	160	6.0	−3.0
Labour	Jonathan Trollope	80	3.0	−2.7
Majority		201	7.5	
Turnout		2,669		
Liberal Democrats hold		Swing		

Longwell Green By-Election 23 July 2026
Party	Candidate	Votes	%	±%
Conservative	Graham Hardwell	951	37.3	−11.2
Reform	Stephen Burge	698	27.4	+27.4
Liberal Democrats	Jim Corrigan	511	20.0	−10.5
Labour	Jack Friend	246	9.7	+9.7
Green	Rachael Ward	143	5.6	+5.6
Majority		253	9.9	
Turnout		2,549		
Conservative hold		Swing		
