= Terence Walker =

British Labour former politician

Terry Walker

Member of Parliament for Kingswood
- In office 28 February 1974 – 3 May 1979
- Preceded by: New constituency
- Succeeded by: Jack Aspinwall

Avon County Councillor for Kings Chase
- In office 7 May 1981 – 1 April 1996
- Preceded by: New Seat
- Succeeded by: Seat Abolished

Personal details
- Born: Terence William Walker; 26 October 1935 (age 90)
- Party: Labour
- Spouse(s): Priscilla Dart (m. 1959; div. 1983) Rosalie Fripp (m. 1983)
- Children: 3
- Education: Bristol Grammar School
- Occupation: Accountant

Terence William Walker (born 26 October 1935) is a British Labour Party former politician.

== Early life ==
Walker was the son of William Edwin and Lilian Grace Walker. Educated at the Grammar School and College of Further Education in Bristol, he became an accountant, and worked for Courage (Western) Limited from 1951 to 1974.

== Political career ==
Walker was the Member of Parliament (MP) for the then-new constituency of Kingswood from 1974 to 1979 when he lost the seat to the Conservative Jack Aspinwall by just 303 votes (0.6%). He was Second Church Estates Commissioner from November 1974 until he lost his seat. He contested Kingswood again at the subsequent 1983 election, but failed to retake the seat. In 1987, he unsuccessfully stood for Bristol North West.

He became a member of Avon County Council in 1981 until its abolition in 1996; he was Vice-Chairman, 1992–93 and Chairman, 1993–94. From then, until his retirement in 2015, he was a member of South Gloucestershire Council, representing Kings Chase ward. During his tenure, he was Deputy Leader of the Labour Group from 1996 to 2009. From 1996 to 2015, Walker was also Chairman of the Avon Fire Authority.

== Personal life ==
In 1959, Walker married Priscilla Dart; the marriage was dissolved in 1983. They have a daughter and two sons. In 1983, Walker married Rosalie Fripp. His daughter-in-law, Julie Walker, was formerly also a South Gloucestershire councillor, both representing the same ward.

Parliament of the United Kingdom
New constituency	Member of Parliament for Kingswood; Feb. 1974–1979	Succeeded by Jack Aspinwall
