= 1986 Kingston upon Thames London Borough Council election =

1986 local election in England

The 1986 Kingston upon Thames Council election took place on 8 May 1986 to elect members of Kingston upon Thames London Borough Council in London, England. The whole council was up for election and the council went into no overall control.

== Election result ==
| Party | Votes | | Seats | | |
| Conservative Party | 49,308 (39.44%) | ▼12.47 | 24 (48.0%) | 24 / 50 | ▼16 |
| SDP-Liberal Alliance | 47,863 (38.28%) | ▲8.09 | 22 (44.0%) | 22 / 50 | ▲15 |
| Labour Party | 26,583 (21.26%) | ▲3.67 | 4 (8.0%) | 4 / 50 | ▲1 |
| Green Party | 1,016 (0.81%) | | 0 (0.0%) | 0 / 50 | |
| Ind. Conservative | 148 (0.12%) | | 0 (0.0%) | 0 / 50 | |
| Ind. Labour | 84 (0.07%) | | 0 (0.0%) | 0 / 50 | |
| Independent | 26 (0.02%) | | 0 (0.0%) | 0 / 50 | |

↓
| 4 | 22 | 24 |
| Labour | SDP-Liberal Alliance | Conservative |

== Ward results ==
Berrylands (3)
| Party | Candidate | Votes | % | ±% |
|---|---|---|---|---|
| Conservative | Peter C Gray* | | | |
| Conservative | Paul N H Clokie* | | | |
| Conservative | Edna E Gray* | | | |
| SDP | | | | |
| SDP | | | | |
| Liberal | | | | |
| Labour | | | | |
| Labour | | | | |
| Labour | | | | |
| Majority | | | | |
| Turnout | | | | |
| Conservative hold | | Swing | | |

Burlington (2)
| Party | Candidate | Votes | % | ±% |
|---|---|---|---|---|
| Liberal | Derek R Osborne | 1,153 | 60.1 | |
| Liberal | Robert W Eyre-Brook | 1,183 | | |
| Conservative | Francis J Steptoe* | 761 | 27.7 | |
| Conservative | | 676 | | |
| Labour | | | 12.2 | |
| Labour | | | | |
| Majority | | | 32.4 | |
| Turnout | | | | |
| Liberal gain from Conservative | | Swing | | |

Cambridge (3)
| Party | Candidate | Votes | % | ±% |
|---|---|---|---|---|
| Liberal | Ian Manders* | 1,702 | | |
| SDP | Julia A Haines | 1,653 | | |
| Liberal | Claire V Jackson | 1,609 | | |
| Conservative | | 1,273 | | |
| Conservative | | | | |
| Conservative | David V Weston* | | | |
| Labour | | | | |
| Labour | | | | |
| Labour | | | | |
| Green | | | | |
| Majority | | | | |
| Turnout | | | | |
| Alliance gain from Conservative | | Swing | | |

Canbury (3)
| Party | Candidate | Votes | % | ±% |
|---|---|---|---|---|
| Liberal | Barbara Lilian Janke | 1,368 | 43.5 | |
| Liberal | Steven J Harris* | 1,355 | | |
| Liberal | John Tilley* | 1,319 | | |
| Labour | | 924 | 29.4 | |
| Labour | | | | |
| Labour | | | | |
| Conservative | | | 18.8 | |
| Conservative | | | | |
| Conservative | | | | |
| Green | | | 5.7 | |
| Independent Labour | | | 2.7 | |
| Majority | | | 14.1 | |
| Turnout | | | | |
| Liberal hold | | Swing | | |

Chessington North (2)
| Party | Candidate | Votes | % | ±% |
|---|---|---|---|---|
| Liberal | Ian F Osborne | 1,292 | 57.7 | |
| Liberal | Brian M Bennett | 1,274 | | |
| Conservative | | 518 | 23.1 | |
| Conservative | | | | |
| Labour | | | 19.2 | |
| Labour | | | | |
| Majority | | | | |
| Turnout | | | | |
| Liberal gain from Conservative | | Swing | | |

Chessington South (3)
| Party | Candidate | Votes | % | ±% |
|---|---|---|---|---|
| Conservative | Valerie Rice* | | | |
| Conservative | Leonard Bazin* | | | |
| Conservative | Trevor F Thorpe* | | | |
| Labour | | | | |
| Labour | | | | |
| Labour | | | | |
| Liberal | | | | |
| Liberal | | | | |
| Liberal | | | | |
| Majority | | | | |
| Turnout | | | | |
| Conservative hold | | Swing | | |

Coombe (2)
| Party | Candidate | Votes | % | ±% |
|---|---|---|---|---|
| Conservative | | | | |
| Conservative | * | | | |
| Liberal | | | | |
| Liberal | | | | |
| Labour | | | | |
| Labour | | | | |
| Majority | | | | |
| Turnout | | | | |
| Conservative hold | | Swing | | |

Grove (3)
| Party | Candidate | Votes | % | ±% |
|---|---|---|---|---|
| Liberal | Christopher A Nicholson* | 1,534 | | |
| Liberal | Christine J Tilley* | 1,512 | | |
| Liberal | Mark R Welling | 1,414 | | |
| Conservative | | | | |
| Conservative | | | | |
| Conservative | | | | |
| Labour | | | | |
| Labour | | | | |
| Labour | | | | |
| Green | | | | |
| Majority | | | | |
| Turnout | | | | |
| Liberal hold | | Swing | | |

Hill (2)
| Party | Candidate | Votes | % | ±% |
|---|---|---|---|---|
| Conservative | Albert L O Gardner* | 1,043 | | |
| Conservative | Melissa J Rowe* | 1,035 | | |
| Liberal | | 498 | | |
| Liberal | | 446 | | |
| Labour | | | | |
| Labour | | | | |
| Green | | | | |
| Independent | | | | |
| Majority | | | | |
| Turnout | | | | |
| Conservative hold | | Swing | | |

Hook (2)
| Party | Candidate | Votes | % | ±% |
|---|---|---|---|---|
| SDP | David B Campanale | 989 | | |
| SDP | William M B Young | 935 | | |
| Conservative | Peter F Groves* | 695 | | |
| Conservative | | 666 | | |
| Labour | | 563 | | |
| Labour | | | | |
| Majority | | | | |
| Turnout | | | | |
| SDP gain from Conservative | | Swing | | |

Malden Manor (2)
| Party | Candidate | Votes | % | ±% |
|---|---|---|---|---|
| Conservative | Adrian J Clare* | | | |
| Conservative | Alan G Kessell* | | | |
| SDP | | | | |
| SDP | | | | |
| Labour | | | | |
| Labour | | | | |
| Majority | | | | |
| Turnout | | | | |
| Conservative hold | | Swing | | |

Norbiton (3)
| Party | Candidate | Votes | % | ±% |
|---|---|---|---|---|
| Labour | Neil A Calvert* | 1,152 | | |
| Liberal | Roger Mark Hayes* | 1,090 | | |
| Labour | Steven Mama | 1,049 | | |
| Liberal | Louise Anne Harris | 1,046 | | |
| Liberal | Roberto A Anghileri | 1,030 | | |
| Labour | Julie A Reay | 1,016 | | |
| Conservative | | | | |
| Conservative | | | | |
| Conservative | | | | |
| Green | | | | |
| Majority | | | | |
| Turnout | | | | |
| Labour gain from Liberal | | Swing | | |

Norbiton Park (2)
| Party | Candidate | Votes | % | ±% |
|---|---|---|---|---|
| Conservative | Frank Hartfree | | | |
| Conservative | Melanie A Walsh | | | |
| Liberal | | | | |
| Liberal | | | | |
| Labour | | | | |
| Labour | | | | |
| Majority | | | | |
| Turnout | | | | |
| Conservative hold | | Swing | | |

St James (3)
| Party | Candidate | Votes | % | ±% |
|---|---|---|---|---|
| Conservative | David H Fraser | 1,666 | | |
| Liberal | Jean Godden* | 1,423 | | |
| Conservative | Gavin N French | 1,419 | | |
| Conservative | Fiona Burkeman | 1,375 | | |
| Liberal | Gerald M Harman | 1,233 | | |
| Liberal | Frederick C Clifton | 1,192 | | |
| Labour | | | | |
| Labour | | | | |
| Labour | | | | |
| Majority | | | | |
| Turnout | | | | |
| Liberal gain from Conservative | | Swing | | |

St Marks (3)
| Party | Candidate | Votes | % | ±% |
|---|---|---|---|---|
| Conservative | Dennis F Doe | | | |
| Conservative | | | | |
| Conservative | * | | | |
| Liberal | | | | |
| Liberal | | | | |
| Liberal | | | | |
| Labour | | | | |
| Labour | | | | |
| Labour | | | | |
| Green | | | | |
| Majority | | | | |
| Turnout | | | | |
| Conservative hold | | Swing | | |

Surbiton Hill (3)
| Party | Candidate | Votes | % | ±% |
|---|---|---|---|---|
| Conservative | * | | | |
| Conservative | * | | | |
| Conservative | | | | |
| SDP | | | | |
| SDP | | | | |
| Liberal | | | | |
| Labour | | | | |
| Labour | | | | |
| Labour | | | | |
| Green | | | | |
| Majority | | | | |
| Turnout | | | | |
| Conservative hold | | Swing | | |

Tolworth East (2)
| Party | Candidate | Votes | % | ±% |
|---|---|---|---|---|
| Liberal | Anthony J Davis* | 1,032 | | |
| Liberal | Jeffrey P Hanna | 989 | | |
| Conservative | | | | |
| Conservative | | | | |
| Labour | | | | |
| Labour | | | | |
| Majority | | | | |
| Turnout | | | | |
| Liberal gain from Conservative | | Swing | | |

Tolworth South (2)
| Party | Candidate | Votes | % | ±% |
|---|---|---|---|---|
| Conservative | | | | |
| Conservative | | | | |
| Labour | | | | |
| Labour | | | | |
| Liberal | | | | |
| SDP | | | | |
| Majority | | | | |
| Turnout | | | | |
| Conservative hold | | Swing | | |

Tolworth West (2)
| Party | Candidate | Votes | % | ±% |
|---|---|---|---|---|
| Labour | | | | |
| Labour | | | | |
| Conservative | | | | |
| Conservative | | | | |
| SDP | | | | |
| SDP | | | | |
| Majority | | | | |
| Turnout | | | | |
| Labour hold | | Swing | | |

Tudor (3)
| Party | Candidate | Votes | % | ±% |
|---|---|---|---|---|
| Liberal | Jennifer R Philpott | | | |
| Liberal | John A Savill | | | |
| SDP | Charles Neil Bloom | | | |
| Conservative | | | | |
| Conservative | | | | |
| Conservative | | | | |
| Labour | | | | |
| Labour | | | | |
| Labour | | | | |
| Majority | | | | |
| Turnout | | | | |
| Alliance gain from Conservative | | Swing | | |
