= 2019 South Gloucestershire Council election =

2019 UK local government election

- 2 May 2019

All 61 seats to South Gloucestershire Council 31 seats needed for a majority

	First party	Second party	Third party
Party	Conservative	Liberal Democrats	Labour
Last election	40 seats, 41.5%	16 seats, 21.9%	14 seats, 24.0%
Seats won	33	17	11
Seat change	▼7	▲1	▼3
Popular vote	58,969	46,202	26,572
Percentage	42.4%	33.2%	19.1%
Swing	▲0.9%	▲11.3%	▼4.9%
- Winner of each seat at the 2019 South Gloucestershire Council election
Council control before election
Conservative
Council control after election
Conservative

The 2019 South Gloucestershire Council election took place on 2 May 2019 to elect members of South Gloucestershire Council in England as part of nationwide local elections.

A 2018 boundary change meant that the total number of seats in the council was reduced from 70 to 61. The Conservatives retained their control of the council, sliding from 40 seats to 33. The Liberal Democrats increased from 16 to 17 seats, and Labour lost three, going to 11.

== Summary ==
=== Election result ===
2019 South Gloucestershire Council election
Party	Candidates	Seats	Gains	Losses	Net gain/loss	Seats %	Votes %	Votes	+/−
Conservative	61	33	6	11	▼7	54.1	42.4	58,969	+0.9
Liberal Democrats	61	17	2	1	▲1	27.9	33.2	46,202	+11.3
Labour	54	11	3	6	▼3	18.0	19.1	26,572	–4.9
Green	7	0	0	0	Steady	0.0	2.1	2,854	+1.1
UKIP	9	0	0	0	Steady	0.0	1.9	2,594	–8.3
Independent	8	0	0	0	Steady	0.0	1.4	1,921	+0.3

== Ward results ==
In wards that are represented by more than one councillor, electors were given more than one vote each, hence the voter turnout may not match the number of votes cast.

Bitton and Oldland Common (2 seats)
Party	Candidate	Votes	%	±%
Conservative	Paul Robert Hughes	979	47.0	
Conservative	Erica Williams	969	46.5	
Labour	Neil Willmott	530	25.4	
Labour	Ben Gibbs	516	24.8	
Liberal Democrats	Paul Aidan Hulbert	347	16.7	
Green	Matthew Furey-King	328	15.7	
Liberal Democrats	Karl Dominic Tomasin	288	13.8	
Turnout		3957	29.4	
Conservative hold		Swing		
Conservative hold		Swing		

Boyd Valley (2 seats)
Party	Candidate	Votes	%	±%
Conservative	Steve Reade	1,305	52.6	
Conservative	Ben Stokes	1,300	52.4	
Liberal Democrats	Philippa Emily Marsden	982	39.6	
Liberal Democrats	Nicholas Andrew Valentine	822	33.1	
Labour	Nigel Goldsmith	281	11.3	
Turnout		4690	35.9	
Conservative hold		Swing		
Conservative hold		Swing		

Bradley Stoke North (2 seats)^{†}
Party	Candidate	Votes	%	±%
Conservative	Sarah Lynn Pomfret	925	40.8	
Conservative	Franklin Owusu-Antwi	866	38.2	
Liberal Democrats	Jon Williams	503	22.2	
Labour	David Michael Addison	494	21.8	
Labour	Fabrizio Fazzino	485	21.4	
Independent	Andy Ward	456	20.1	
Liberal Democrats	Ian Noel Joseph	343	15.1	
Independent	Daniel John Elliott	297	13.1	
Turnout		4369	29.1	
Conservative hold		Swing		
Conservative hold		Swing		

^{†}Increased to 2 seats

Bradley Stoke South (2 seats)
Party	Candidate	Votes	%	±%
Conservative	John Ashe	753	43.1	
Conservative	Roger Avenin	744	42.6	
Labour	Kulwinder Singh Sappal	423	24.2	
Labour	Ravi Kumar Vinjamuri	364	20.8	
Independent	Elaine Ann Hardwick	293	16.8	
Liberal Democrats	Sue Hope	260	14.9	
Independent	Marion Ward	258	14.8	
Liberal Democrats	Omar Aziz Beg	213	12.2	
Independent	Bex Ward	93	5.3	
Turnout		3401	26.2	
Conservative hold		Swing		
Conservative hold		Swing		

Charfield (1 seat)
Party	Candidate	Votes	%	±%
Liberal Democrats	John O`Neill	869	73.3	
Conservative	John Dudley Buxton	250	21.1	
Labour	Gary Raymond Clarke	66	5.6	
Turnout		1185	36.9	
Liberal Democrats hold		Swing		

Charlton and Cribbs (3 seats)
Party	Candidate	Votes	%	±%
Conservative	Sanjay Kumar Shambhu	520	39.5	
Conservative	Jo Buddharaju	511	38.8	
Conservative	Brian Hopkinson	497	37.8	
Labour	Elaine Mary Martin	403	30.6	
Labour	Keith Walker	388	29.5	
Labour	Mubashar Hussain Chaudhry	349	26.5	
Liberal Democrats	Brenda Mary Osyth Allen	191	14.5	
Liberal Democrats	Anne Penelope White	190	14.4	
Liberal Democrats	Matthew Stringer	184	14.0	
UKIP	George Pykov	168	12.8	
UKIP	Jocelyn Briffett	162	12.3	
UKIP	Tom Crawley	157	11.9	
Turnout		3720	26.0	
Conservative hold		Swing		
Conservative hold		Swing		
Conservative hold		Swing		

Chipping Sodbury and Cotswold Edge (2 seats)^{†}
Party	Candidate	Votes	%	±%
Liberal Democrats	Adrian Rush	1,556	47.4	
Liberal Democrats	Patricia Anne Trull	1,539	46.9	
Conservative	Rob Creer	1527	46.5	
Conservative	Becky Romaine	1352	41.2	
Labour	Ruth Mary Jahans-Price	183	5.6	
Labour	Roger Frederick Jahans-Price	158	4.8	
Turnout		6315	43.1	
Liberal Democrats hold		Swing		
Liberal Democrats gain from Conservative		Swing		

^{†}Formerly 'Chipping Sodbury'

Dodington (2 seats)
Party	Candidate	Votes	%	±%
Liberal Democrats	Tony Davis	1,522	68.3	
Liberal Democrats	Louise Anne Harris	1,516	68.0	
Conservative	Ian James Donovan Livermore	649	29.1	
Conservative	Simon Peter Schofield	614	27.5	
Turnout		4301	30.0	
Liberal Democrats hold		Swing		
Liberal Democrats hold		Swing		

Emersons Green (3 seats)
Party	Candidate	Votes	%	±%
Conservative	Judy Adams	1,379	45.5	
Conservative	Rachael Anne Hunt	1,336	44.1	
Conservative	Colin Hunt	1,305	43.0	
Labour	Sadik Adam Al-Hassan	1037	34.2	
Labour	Matthew Palmer	978	32.3	
Labour	Jonathan Maytham	874	28.8	
Liberal Democrats	Andrew Paul Riches	610	20.1	
Liberal Democrats	Rachel Claire Hathaway	569	18.8	
Liberal Democrats	Martin William Monk	447	14.7	
Turnout		8535	28.2	
Conservative hold		Swing		
Conservative hold		Swing		
Conservative hold		Swing		

Filton (2 seats)^{†}
Party	Candidate	Votes	%	±%
Labour	Adam Paul Monk	769	33.5	
Conservative	Christopher John Wood	739	32.2	
Labour	Ian Keith Mark Scott	738	32.2	
Conservative	John Tucker	587	25.6	
UKIP	Keith Briffett	345	15.0	
Green	Diana Warner	319	13.9	
UKIP	Philip Winter	280	12.2	
Liberal Democrats	Lindsay Jane Gough	242	10.6	
Green	Murali Thoppil	238	10.4	
Liberal Democrats	Ayrden James Pocock	163	7.1	
Turnout		4420	30.3	
Labour hold		Swing		
Conservative gain from Labour		Swing		

^{†}Reduced from 3 seats

Frampton Cotterell (3 seats)
Party	Candidate	Votes	%	±%
Liberal Democrats	Claire Louise Young	2,174	53.3	
Liberal Democrats	Tristan Adam Sutton Clark	1,979	48.5	
Liberal Democrats	Jon Lean	1,855	45.5	
Conservative	Tom Howell	1590	39.0	
Conservative	Marian Joy Gilpin	1481	36.3	
Conservative	Jenna Marie Hale	1458	35.7	
Independent	Linda Williams	340	8.3	
Labour	Roger Edward Millard	268	6.6	
Labour	Jonathan Terence Trollope	226	5.5	
Labour	Terry Trollope	215	5.3	
Turnout		11586	40.8	
Liberal Democrats hold		Swing		
Liberal Democrats hold		Swing		
Liberal Democrats hold		Swing		

Frenchay and Downend (3 seats)
Party	Candidate	Votes	%	±%
Conservative	Benjamin Paul Burton	1,818	48.4	
Conservative	Jon Hunt	1,755	46.7	
Conservative	David James Griffiths	1,637	43.6	
Labour	AJ Coakham	1017	27.1	
Labour	Paul Harris	886	23.6	
Liberal Democrats	Andy Daer	829	22.1	
Labour	Theodore Jonathan Kent	828	22.0	
Liberal Democrats	Paul Andrew Sayers	608	16.2	
Liberal Democrats	Tim White	569	15.1	
UKIP	Trevor Crotch-Harvey	444	11.8	
Turnout		10391	37.2	
Conservative hold		Swing		
Conservative hold		Swing		
Conservative hold		Swing		

Hanham (3 seats)
Party	Candidate	Votes	%	±%
Conservative	June Patricia Bamford	1,618	49.6	
Conservative	Brenda Barbara Langley	1,527	46.8	
Conservative	Jason Pearce	1,403	43.0	
Labour	Caroline Louise White	777	23.8	
Labour	Andy Chubb	773	23.7	
Labour	Wayne Prewett	712	21.8	
Green	Jack Benjamin Cox	644	19.8	
Green	Jenny Vernon	638	19.6	
Green	Joseph Alexander Evans	569	17.5	
Liberal Democrats	Denise Christine Gawn	246	7.5	
Liberal Democrats	Peter Edmund Coley	240	7.4	
Liberal Democrats	Toby Andrew Jefferies	214	6.6	
Turnout		9361	33.5	
Conservative hold		Swing		
Conservative hold		Swing		
Conservative hold		Swing		

Kingswood (2 seats)
Party	Candidate	Votes	%	±%
Labour	April Janet Lilian Clare Begley	687	48.4	
Labour	Andrea Jane Reid	594	41.8	
Conservative	Tony Griffiths	500	35.2	
Conservative	Andrew Mills	494	34.8	
Liberal Democrats	Sue Walker	228	16.1	
Liberal Democrats	Hossein Pirooz	211	14.9	
Turnout		2714	23.6	
Labour hold		Swing		
Labour hold		Swing		

Longwell Green (2 seats)
Party	Candidate	Votes	%	±%
Conservative	Christine Price	1,545	61.6	
Conservative	Toby William Savage	1,369	54.6	
Labour	Ron Hardie	677	27.0	
Labour	Pat Penny	605	24.1	
Liberal Democrats	Cheryl Anne Kirby	330	13.2	
Liberal Democrats	Clive Parkinson	293	11.7	
Turnout		4819	33.1	
Conservative hold		Swing		
Conservative hold		Swing		

New Cheltenham (2 seats)
Party	Candidate	Votes	%	±%
Labour	Sandie Davis	785	43.6	
Labour	Kim Scudamore	756	42.0	
Conservative	Stewart Hadley-Clarke	740	41.1	
Conservative	Gagan Deep Singh	679	37.7	
Liberal Democrats	Chris Willmore	225	12.5	
Liberal Democrats	Martin Braid Joinson	217	12.0	
Turnout		3402	27.3	
Labour hold		Swing		
Labour hold		Swing		

Parkwall and Warmley (2 seats)
Party	Candidate	Votes	%	±%
Conservative	Elizabeth Bromiley	923	46.9	
Conservative	Samuel Karl Bromiley	850	43.2	
Labour	Pippa Gibbs	670	34.0	
Labour	Barry Malcolm West	598	30.4	
Independent	Nick Barrett	210	10.7	
Liberal Democrats	Kenton James Boon	186	9.5	
Liberal Democrats	Benj Emmerson	151	7.7	
Turnout		3588	27.6	
Conservative hold		Swing		
Conservative hold		Swing		

Patchway Coniston (1 seat)
Party	Candidate	Votes	%	±%
Labour	Sam William Scott	328	36.4	
UKIP	Ben Walker	230	25.5	
Conservative	Ken Dando	228	25.3	
Liberal Democrats	Dave Hockey	115	12.8	
Turnout		901	24.8	
Labour hold		Swing		

Pilning & Severn Beach (1 seat)
Party	Candidate	Votes	%	±%
Conservative	Robert Charles Griffin	483	41.7	
Independent	Olga Taylor	271	23.4	
Labour	Alexander Francis Akerman	206	17.8	
Green	Tom Meadowcroft	118	10.2	
Liberal Democrats	Gabrielle Marie Davis	79	6.8	
Turnout		1157	31.4	
Conservative hold		Swing		

Severn Vale (2 seats)
Party	Candidate	Votes	%	±%
Conservative	Matthew Riddle	1,740	54.6	
Conservative	Keith John Burchell	1,506	47.3	
Liberal Democrats	Tony Williams	1004	31.5	
Liberal Democrats	Marion Christine Reeve	1000	31.4	
UKIP	Louis Crawley	330	10.4	
Labour	David Ward	200	6.3	
Labour	Gillian Foxton	187	5.9	
Turnout		5967	41.9	
Conservative hold		Swing		
Conservative hold		Swing		

Staple Hill and Mangotsfield (3 seats)
Party	Candidate	Votes	%	±%
Labour	Ian Michael Boulton	1,936	58.4	
Labour	Michael Bell	1,742	52.6	
Labour	Katie Morrison Cooper	1,612	48.7	
Conservative	Matt Pitts	1062	32.1	
Conservative	James Lee Hunt	955	28.8	
Conservative	Samson Akinbo	820	24.8	
Liberal Democrats	Guy William Rawlinson	334	10.1	
Liberal Democrats	Wully Perks	330	10.0	
Liberal Democrats	Crispin Toby John Allard	328	9.9	
Turnout		9119	31.0	
Labour hold		Swing		
Labour hold		Swing		
Labour hold		Swing		

Stoke Gifford (3 seats)
Party	Candidate	Votes	%	±%
Conservative	Brian John Allinson	1,452	44.8	
Conservative	Keith Edward Cranney	1,371	42.3	
Conservative	Ernest Derek Brown	1,317	40.6	
Labour	Jenny James	926	28.6	
Labour	Brian Peter Mead	752	23.2	
Labour	Tom Mewies	733	22.6	
Liberal Democrats	Pam Shipp	628	19.4	
Liberal Democrats	John Paul Ford	590	18.2	
Liberal Democrats	Bob Griffin	575	17.7	
UKIP	Fred Hillberg	477	14.7	
Turnout		8821	30.8	
Conservative hold		Swing		
Conservative hold		Swing		
Conservative hold		Swing		

Stoke Park and Cheswick (1 seat)
Party	Candidate	Votes	%	±%
Liberal Democrats	James Edward Arrowsmith	364	50.7	
Conservative	George William Pendrill Maggs	227	31.6	
Labour	Dayley Patrick Gerald Lawrence	127	17.7	
Turnout		718	28.6	
Liberal Democrats hold		Swing		

Thornbury (3 seats)
Party	Candidate	Votes	%	±%
Liberal Democrats	Shirley Anne Holloway	2,771	70.9	
Liberal Democrats	Maggie Tyrrell	2,766	70.8	
Liberal Democrats	Jayne Stansfield	2,652	67.9	
Conservative	Sue Gillett	1098	28.1	
Conservative	Steve Chubb	982	25.1	
Conservative	Simon Martyn Begbey	900	23.0	
Turnout		11169	39.2	
Liberal Democrats hold		Swing		
Liberal Democrats hold		Swing		
Liberal Democrats hold		Swing		

Winterbourne (2 seats)
Party	Candidate	Votes	%	±%
Conservative	Nicholas Peter Labuschagne	1,022	54.9	
Conservative	Trevor John Jones	935	50.2	
Liberal Democrats	Peter Anthony Bruce	529	28.4	
Liberal Democrats	Kimberley Lauren Stansfield	487	26.2	
Labour	Anya Louise Hickman	326	17.5	
Labour	Rowan Francis	316	17.0	
Turnout		3615	32.9	
Conservative hold		Swing		
Conservative hold		Swing		

Woodstock (2 seats)^{†}
Party	Candidate	Votes	%	±%
Labour	Pat Rooney	787	44.9	
Labour	Alison Evans	781	44.6	
Conservative	StJohn Timothy Cross	648	37.0	
Conservative	Charlotte Hartill	585	33.4	
Liberal Democrats	James Pringle Corrigan	294	17.0	
Liberal Democrats	Linda Ann Boon	240	13.7	
Turnout		3335	23.7	
Labour hold		Swing		
Labour hold		Swing		

^{†}Reduced from 3 seats

Yate Central (2 seats)
Party	Candidate	Votes	%	±%
Liberal Democrats	Ruth Brenda Davis	1,398	66.1	
Liberal Democrats	John Henry Gawn	1,345	63.6	
Conservative	Jo Lewis	546	25.8	
Conservative	Amy Michelle McNeill	544	25.7	
Labour	Kathleen Langley	157	7.4	
Labour	Michael Paul McGrath	155	7.3	
Turnout		4145	32.5	
Liberal Democrats hold		Swing		
Liberal Democrats hold		Swing		

Yate North (3 seats)
Party	Candidate	Votes	%	±%
Liberal Democrats	Mike Drew	1,898	61.6	
Liberal Democrats	John Anthony Davis	1,788	58.0	
Liberal Democrats	Ben Nutland	1,768	57.3	
Conservative	Liz Brennan	994	32.2	
Conservative	Sonia Williams	960	31.1	
Conservative	Matt Lewis	937	30.4	
Labour	Clare Fiona Beasley	241	7.8	
Labour	Robert John Lomas	240	7.8	
Turnout		8826	35.7	
Liberal Democrats hold		Swing		
Liberal Democrats hold		Swing		
Liberal Democrats hold		Swing		
