= Wansdyke (disambiguation) =

Wansdyke is a series of early medieval defensive linear earthworks in the West Country of England.

Wansdyke may also refer to:

- Wansdyke (district), a former district in Avon, England
- Wansdyke (UK Parliament constituency), a former county constituency in the House of Commons of the Parliament of the United Kingdom
