= Jack Aspinwall =

British politician

Member of Parliament for Wansdyke
- In office 9 June 1983 – 8 April 1997
- Preceded by: Constituency created
- Succeeded by: Dan Norris

Member of Parliament for Kingswood
- In office 4 May 1979 – 9 June 1983
- Preceded by: Terence Walker
- Succeeded by: Robert Hayward

Personal details
- Born: Jack Heywood Aspinwall; 5 February 1933 Bootle, Lancashire, UK
- Died: 19 May 2015 (aged 82) Willsbridge, Gloucestershire, UK
- Party: Conservative (from 1975); Liberal (before 1974)
- Spouse: Brenda Squires (m. 1954)
- Children: 3

Jack Heywood Aspinwall (5 February 1933 – 19 May 2015) was a British Conservative politician.

== Career ==
In the February 1974 and October 1974 elections, Aspinwall was the Liberal Party candidate for Kingswood in the rural county of Avon, coming third in both. He changed his allegiance to the Conservatives in 1975 as "the priority was to defeat socialism" and was elected as the Member of Parliament for the seat in 1979, beating the Labour incumbent, Terence Walker, by 303 votes. He served there for one parliament until the 1983 election, when he stood for and was elected for the new constituency of Wansdyke, which he represented for three further parliaments until his retirement at the 1997 general election.

== Personal life ==
Born in Bootle, Aspinwall had two brothers, Frank and Raymond. He won a scholarship to Prescot Grammar School, but his mother died when he was 14 years old and he went into care. He joined the RAF after leaving school. While stationed in Wiltshire in 1954, he met his future wife, Brenda Squires, whom he married in 1954. He and his wife had three children. Jack Aspinwall died of cancer at Willsbridge, near Bristol, England, on 19 May 2015, aged 82.

== Sources ==
- Times Guide to the House of Commons, Times Newspapers Limited, 1992 edition.

Parliament of the United Kingdom
Preceded by Terence Walker	Member of Parliament for Kingswood; 1979–1983	Succeeded by Robert Hayward
New constituency	Member of Parliament for Wansdyke; 1983–1997	Succeeded by Dan Norris
