= 2015 South Gloucestershire Council election =

2015 UK local government election

- 7 May 2015

All 70 seats on the South Gloucestershire Council 36 seats needed for a majority
	First party	Second party
	Con	LD
Party	Conservative	Liberal Democrats
Last election	34 seats, 42.0%	21 seats, 25.5%
Seats won	40	16
Seat change	▲6	▼5
Popular vote	62,019	32,725
Percentage	41.5%	21.9%
Swing	▼0.5pp	▼3.6pp
	Third party	Fourth party
	Lab	UKIP
Party	Labour	UKIP
Last election	15 seats, 29.8%	0 seats, 0.6%
Seats won	14	0
Seat change	▼1	0
Popular vote	35,914	15,245
Percentage	24.0%	10.2%
Swing	▼5.8pp	▲9.6pp
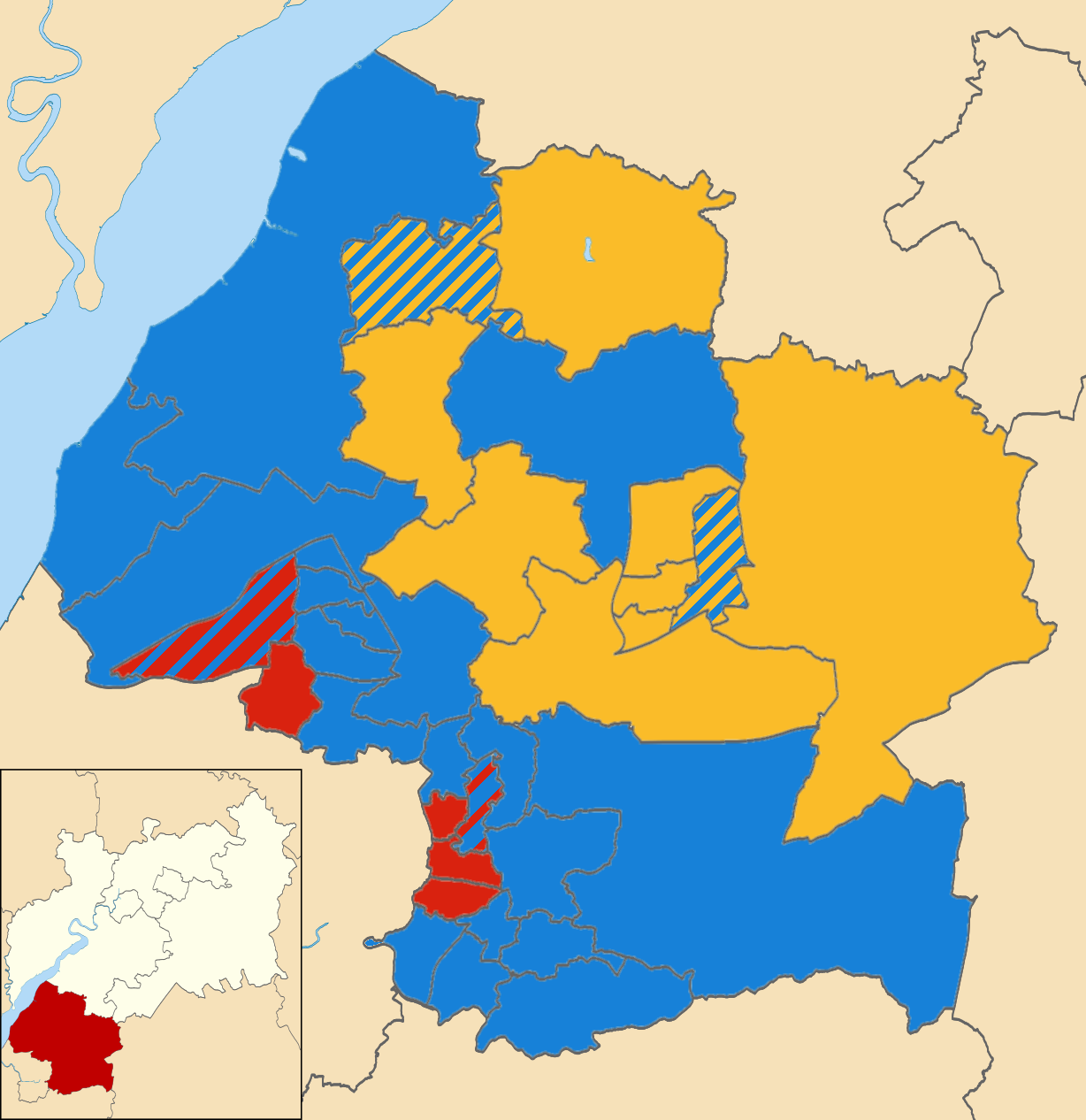
- Map showing the results of the election in each ward. Colours denote the winning party as shown in the main table of results.
Council control before election
NOC
Council control after election
Conservative

The 2015 South Gloucestershire Council election took place on 7 May 2015 to elect members of South Gloucestershire Council in England as part of nationwide local elections.

For the first time since the creation of South Gloucestershire, the Conservatives took an overall majority with 40 of the 70 seats. This was the second one-party majority in the history of South Gloucestershire, after the Lib Dems' 1999-2003 control.

== Election result ==
South Gloucestershire Council election, 2015
Party	Seats	Gains	Losses	Net gain/loss	Seats %	Votes %	Votes	+/−
Conservative	40	6	0	▲6	57.1	41.5	62,019	▼0.5
Liberal Democrats	16	0	5	▼5	22.8	21.9	32,725	▼3.6
Labour	14	0	1	▼1	20.0	24.0	35,914	▼5.8
UKIP	0	0	0	±0	0.0	10.2	15,245	▲9.6
Independent	0	0	0	±0	0.0	1.1	1,601	▼0.4
Green	0	0	0	±0	0.0	1.0	1,568	▲0.1
TUSC	0	0	0	±0	0.0	0.2	372	

== Ward results ==
Almondsbury (1 seat)
Party	Candidate	Votes	%	±%
Conservative	Keith Burchell	1425	59.4	−8.3
Liberal Democrats	Andrew Lewis Charles Tubb	648	27.0	+9.0
UKIP	Caroline Sullivan	324	13.5	
Conservative hold		Swing		

Bitton (1 seat)
Party	Candidate	Votes	%	±%
Conservative	Erica Williams	1144	55.7	+10.0
Labour	John William Graham	592	28.8	+8.8
Liberal Democrats	Issabell Alyce Scudamore Chitson	319	15.5	−18.7
Conservative hold		Swing		

Boyd Valley (2 seats)
Party	Candidate	Votes	%	±%
Conservative	Steve Reade	2175	25.6	+4.0
Conservative	Ben Stokes	2129	25.1	+5.0
Liberal Democrats	Karen Margaret Wilkinson	1438	16.9	+0.6
Liberal Democrats	Christine Jean Moore	1409	16.6	+0.5
Labour	Nigel Goldsmith	743	8.7	+0.7
Labour	Roger Frederick Jahans-price	600	7.1	+0.8
Conservative hold		Swing		
Conservative hold		Swing		

Bradley Stoke Central and Stoke Lodge (2 seats)
Party	Candidate	Votes	%	±%
Conservative	Brian Hopkinson	1838	26.3	+0.9
Conservative	Sarah Lynn Pomfret	1452	20.8	−3.0
Labour	Anne Fiona Addison	1022	14.6	−0.3
UKIP	Stephen Barr	711	10.2	
Liberal Democrats	Sarah Elizabeth Drake	624	8.9	−0.4
UKIP	Natasha Thwaites	541	7.8	
Liberal Democrats	Jon Williams	459	6.6	−0.4
Independent	Rebecca Genevieve Strong	332	4.8	−2.6
Conservative hold		Swing		
Conservative hold		Swing		

Bradley Stoke North (1 seat)
Party	Candidate	Votes	%	±%
Conservative	Paul Hardwick	832	41.4	−2.2
UKIP	Ben Walker	479	23.8	
Labour	Philip Michael Edwards	455	22.6	−0.9
Liberal Democrats	Dawn Jean Clode	243	12.1	−20.7
Conservative hold		Swing		

Bradley Stoke South (2 seats)
Party	Candidate	Votes	%	±%
Conservative	John Ashe	1912	23.5	−1.3
Conservative	Roger Avenin	1799	22.1	−1.9
Labour	David Michael Addison	1124	13.8	−0.6
Labour	Anthony Harris Blake	866	10.7	−0.7
UKIP	Tom Crawley	796	9.8	
UKIP	Derrick Powell	641	7.9	
Liberal Democrats	Andrew Terence White	584	7.2	−5.8
Liberal Democrats	Christine Joan Willmore	408	5.0	−7.2
Conservative hold		Swing		
Conservative hold		Swing		

Charfield (1 seat)
Party	Candidate	Votes	%	±%
Liberal Democrats	John O`neill	1426	60.7	+5.6
Conservative	John Dudley Buxton	925	39.3	+5.3
Liberal Democrats hold		Swing		

Chipping Sodbury (2 seats)
Party	Candidate	Votes	%	±%
Liberal Democrats	Linda Ann Boon	1862	24.1	−3.3
Conservative	Rob Creer	1736	22.5	+2.1
Conservative	Callum Jake Warren	1630	21.1	+2.9
Liberal Democrats	Adrian Samuel Rush	1614	20.9	−3.5
Labour	Kathleen Langley	448	5.8	+1.1
Labour	David Michael Channon	429	5.6	+1.3
Liberal Democrats hold		Swing		
Conservative gain from Liberal Democrats		Swing		

Cotswold Edge (1 seat)
Party	Candidate	Votes	%	±%
Liberal Democrats	Sue Hope	1077	50.4	−2.2
Conservative	Martyn John Radnedge	942	44.1	+2.0
Labour	Ruth Mary Jahans-price	119	5.6	−10.6
Liberal Democrats hold		Swing		

Dodington (2 seats)
Party	Candidate	Votes	%	±%
Liberal Democrats	Tony Davis	1592	25.0	−7.5
Liberal Democrats	Gloria Elsie Stephen	1375	21.6	−10.5
UKIP	Russ Martin	920	14.4	
Conservative	Phil Jones	879	13.8	+2.8
Conservative	Jon Shaw	734	11.5	+1.1
Labour	Ann Fletcher	498	7.8	+0.7
Labour	David Ward	371	5.8	+1.1
Liberal Democrats hold		Swing		
Liberal Democrats hold		Swing		

Downend (3 seats)
Party	Candidate	Votes	%	±%
Conservative	Janet Biggin	3488	19.1	−0.5
Conservative	Jon Hunt	3421	18.7	−0.3
Conservative	Katherine Morris	2945	16.1	−1.0
Labour	Julie Mary Snelling	2126	11.6	+0.5
Labour	Bill Bowrey	2084	11.4	+1.2
Labour	Wendy Sheila Bowrey	2044	11.2	+1.5
Liberal Democrats	Howard John Alan Gawler	794	4.3	−0.7
Liberal Democrats	Anthony Richard Wallis	718	3.9	−0.5
Liberal Democrats	Paul Aidan Hulbert	678	3.7	−0.2
Conservative hold		Swing		
Conservative hold		Swing		
Conservative hold		Swing		

Emersons Green (3 seats)
Party	Candidate	Votes	%	±%
Conservative	Rachael Hunt	3403	19.4	−0.5
Conservative	Colin Hunt	3299	18.8	−0.1
Conservative	Dave Kearns	2913	16.6	−1.4
Labour	Caroline Elizabeth Johnson	1817	10.3	−0.8
Labour	Martin Neil Baker	1655	9.4	−0.4
Labour	Gordon Richards	1534	8.7	−1.0
UKIP	Matt Pitts	1127	6.4	
Liberal Democrats	Andrew Paul Riches	746	4.2	−1.5
Liberal Democrats	Teresa Constance Lawrance	555	3.2	−1.0
Liberal Democrats	Alan Sidney Lawrance	535	3.0	−1.1
Conservative hold		Swing		
Conservative hold		Swing		
Conservative hold		Swing		

Filton (3 seats)
Party	Candidate	Votes	%	±%
Labour	Roger Malcolm Hutchinson	1675	11.7	−2.2
Labour	Adam Paul Monk	1608	11.2	−2.5
Labour	Ian Keith Mark Scott	1546	10.8	−2.7
Conservative	Maria Silveira	1436	10.0	−3.0
Conservative	John Tucker	1339	9.3	−3.3
Conservative	Benjamin Randles	1308	9.1	−3.5
UKIP	Keith Briffett	1222	8.5	
UKIP	Alan Tink	997	6.9	
UKIP	David Crowley	892	6.2	
Green	Kyrie Tereza Roberts	682	4.7	−0.3
Green	Lance Jon Finney	677	4.7	
Liberal Democrats	Helen Margaret Harrison	431	3.0	±0.0
Liberal Democrats	Mary Katherine Perks	321	2.2	−0.8
Liberal Democrats	Marc Daniel Scawen	239	1.7	−0.7
Labour hold		Swing		
Labour hold		Swing		
Labour hold		Swing		

Frampton Cotterell (2 seats)
Party	Candidate	Votes	%	±%
Liberal Democrats	Dave Hockey	2090	25.1	−2.8
Liberal Democrats	Pat Hockey	1852	22.2	−3.1
Conservative	George Georgiou	1678	20.1	+2.6
Conservative	Matt Wells	1572	18.9	+2.6
Labour	Susan Mary Keel	608	7.3	+0.5
Labour	Terry Trollope	533	6.4	−0.2
Liberal Democrats hold		Swing		
Liberal Democrats hold		Swing		

Frenchay and Stoke Park (2 seats)
Party	Candidate	Votes	%	±%
Conservative	Trevor Jones	1545	26.2	−3.0
Conservative	Bob Pullin	1312	22.3	−6.2
Labour	David Baksa	862	14.6	−0.7
Labour	Thomas Michael Renhard	783	13.3	−1.3
Liberal Democrats	Hilary Kitchen	544	9.2	−0.4
UKIP	James Fraser	438	7.4	
Liberal Democrats	Tristan Adam Sutton Clark	410	7.0	±0.0
Conservative hold		Swing		
Conservative hold		Swing		

Hanham (3 seats)
Party	Candidate	Votes	%	±%
Conservative	June Patricia Bamford	2937	16.8	−3.0
Conservative	John Goddard	2913	16.7	−3.6
Conservative	Heather Goddard	2822	16.1	−2.9
Labour	Gerry Mcallister	1855	10.6	−2.1
Labour	Carl James Lander	1777	10.2	−1.7
Labour	Mike Newman	1693	9.7	−1.3
UKIP	Paul Harsant	1246	7.1	
UKIP	Granville Brynley John Jenkins	1123	6.4	
Liberal Democrats	Howard Joseph Patrick Finnegan	382	2.2	−0.8
Liberal Democrats	Vanessa Helen Scawen	374	2.1	+0.3
Liberal Democrats	Marilyn Clare Palmer	367	2.1	+0.4
Conservative hold		Swing		
Conservative hold		Swing		
Conservative hold		Swing		

Kings Chase (3 seats)
Party	Candidate	Votes	%	±%
Labour	April Janet Lilian Clare Begley	2083	16.0	−1.3
Labour	Martin Philip Farmer	1878	14.4	−2.8
Labour	Kim Jeremy Paul Scudamore	1844	14.1	−2.4
Conservative	Bernadette Lake	1639	12.6	−1.3
Conservative	Dave Lake	1586	12.1	−1.5
Conservative	Kris Murphy	1516	11.6	−1.8
UKIP	Peter Clampitt-dix	1452	11.1	
Liberal Democrats	Joan Bates Reeves	396	3.0	−0.2
Liberal Democrats	Colin Peter Fender	281	2.2	−0.5
Liberal Democrats	Christine Dianne Thomas	264	2.0	−0.2
TUSC	Jack Cran	115	0.9	
Labour hold		Swing		
Labour hold		Swing		
Labour hold		Swing		

Ladden Brook (1 seat)
Party	Candidate	Votes	%	±%
Conservative	Marian Joy Lewis	1132	48.0	+24.3
Liberal Democrats	Duncan Stuart Goodland	974	41.3	−12.9
Labour	Robert John Lomas	253	10.7	−11.3
Conservative gain from Liberal Democrats		Swing		

Longwell Green (2 seats)
Party	Candidate	Votes	%	±%
Conservative	Christine Price	2405	31.1	−2.4
Conservative	Toby Savage	1745	22.6	−6.4
Labour	Tim Crook	1136	14.7	+1.3
Labour	Helen Tina Farmer	1001	13.0	+0.1
UKIP	Carole Annette Hunt	880	11.4	
Liberal Democrats	Martin William Monk	318	4.1	−1.7
Liberal Democrats	Guy William Rawlinson	243	3.1	−2.1
Conservative hold		Swing		
Conservative hold		Swing		

Oldland Common (2 seats)
Party	Candidate	Votes	%	±%
Conservative	Paul Hughes	1739	22.8	+7.1
Conservative	Samuel Bromiley	1595	20.9	+6.0
Labour	Roger William Coales	1250	16.4	+0.5
Labour	Pat Apps	1179	15.5	+0.1
Liberal Democrats	Karen Jane Ross	1059	13.9	−6.5
Liberal Democrats	Andrew James Thomas	792	10.4	−7.5
Conservative gain from Liberal Democrats		Swing		
Conservative gain from Liberal Democrats		Swing		

Parkwall (2 seats)
Party	Candidate	Votes	%	±%
Conservative	Nick Barrett	1938	25.8	+1.9
Conservative	Kaye Barrett	1843	24.5	+1.0
Labour	Ron Hardie	1676	22.3	+1.0
Labour	Rikki Michael Teml	1259	16.7	+4.2
Liberal Democrats	Grace Miriam Boddy	407	5.4	+0.3
Liberal Democrats	Lois Barbara Nicks	397	5.3	+0.5
Conservative hold		Swing		
Conservative hold		Swing		

Patchway (3 seats)
Party	Candidate	Votes	%	±%
Labour	Eve Orpen	1575	12.9	−2.4
Labour	Keith Walker	1453	11.9	−2.7
Conservative	Kenneth Richard Dando	1436	11.7	+1.5
Labour	Sam William Scott	1365	11.2	−2.8
Conservative	Patsy Coleman	1268	10.4	+0.3
Conservative	Rosaleen Geraldine Messenger	1232	10.1	+1.1
UKIP	Jon Butler	1162	9.5	
UKIP	Joe Jackson	840	6.9	
UKIP	Ed Rose	679	5.6	
Liberal Democrats	Alan John Garland	515	4.2	−4.1
Liberal Democrats	Jane Alison Allinson	392	3.2	−4.4
Liberal Democrats	Peter Eaton Heaney	317	2.6	−4.8
Labour hold		Swing		
Labour hold		Swing		
Conservative gain from Labour		Swing		

Pilning and Severn Beach (1 seat)
Party	Candidate	Votes	%	±%
Conservative	Robert Griffin	1300	71.3	+25.3
Liberal Democrats	John Harris	523	28.7	−10.8
Conservative hold		Swing		

Rodway (3 seats)
Party	Candidate	Votes	%	±%
Conservative	John Sullivan	2489	16.4	+1.2
Labour	Michael Richard Bell	2444	16.1	±0.0
Conservative	Judy Adams	2392	15.7	+0.6
Conservative	Rich Nichols	2314	15.2	+1.6
Labour	Sandie Davis	2181	14.4	−0.4
Labour	Eric Hargrave	2076	13.7	−0.2
Liberal Democrats	John Paul Ford	543	3.6	+1.2
Liberal Democrats	Wulstan John Newton Perks	419	2.8	+0.6
Liberal Democrats	Peter Laurence Tyzack	334	2.2	+0.1
Conservative hold		Swing		
Labour hold		Swing		
Conservative hold		Swing		

Severn (1 seat)
Party	Candidate	Votes	%	±%
Conservative	Matthew Robert Riddle	1883	77.3	+3.5
Liberal Democrats	Alan Dallas Moller	383	15.7	−3.1
Labour	Gillian Foxton	171	7.0	−0.4
Conservative hold		Swing		

Siston (1 seat)
Party	Candidate	Votes	%	±%
Conservative	Ian Adams	1493	60.3	+9.3
Liberal Democrats	Edward Roger Allinson	726	29.3	+16.7
Labour	Peter Jeffrey Goodman	257	10.4	−25.0
Conservative hold		Swing		

Staple Hill (2 seats)
Party	Candidate	Votes	%	±%
Labour	Ian Michael Boulton	3409	32.5	+0.9
Labour	Shirley Diana Potts	3214	30.7	+0.3
Conservative	Elizabeth Shepherd	1901	18.1	+2.3
Conservative	Elaine Hardwick	1153	11.0	−3.7
Liberal Democrats	Kenton James Boon	443	4.2	+0.1
Liberal Democrats	Richard Clive Parkinson	359	3.4	+0.1
Labour hold		Swing		
Labour hold		Swing		

Stoke Gifford (3 seats)
Party	Candidate	Votes	%	±%
Conservative	Brian Allinson	2743	16.3	−2.0
Conservative	Ernie Brown	2480	14.8	−1.8
Conservative	Keith Cranney	2272	13.5	−1.6
Labour	Ben Scott	1532	9.1	−2.3
Labour	Andrew John Chubb	1324	7.9	−3.0
Labour	Dayley Patrick Gerald Lawrence	1324	7.9	−2.0
UKIP	Louis Crawley	1245	7.4	
UKIP	Ginge Dangerfield	1096	6.5	
Green	Richard William Burton	886	5.3	+0.5
Liberal Democrats	Becky Williams	828	4.9	±0.0
Liberal Democrats	Benjamin Peter Campbell	592	3.5	−0.9
Liberal Democrats	Laurence Bruce Walker	480	2.9	−0.7
Conservative hold		Swing		
Conservative hold		Swing		
Conservative hold		Swing		

Thornbury North (2 seats)
Party	Candidate	Votes	%	±%
Liberal Democrats	Clare Mary Fardell	1770	20.6	−0.3
Conservative	David Chubb	1677	19.5	+5.6
Liberal Democrats	Benj Richard Emmerson	1572	18.3	−1.2
Conservative	Quentin Killey	1175	13.7	+1.5
Independent	Vincent Francis Costello	851	9.9	−2.4
UKIP	David Crowle	553	6.4	
Labour	Sonia Charlotte Jackson	512	5.9	+1.1
Labour	Robert William Hall	496	5.8	+1.0
Liberal Democrats hold		Swing		
Conservative gain from Liberal Democrats		Swing		

Thornbury South and Alveston (2 seats)
Party	Candidate	Votes	%	±%
Liberal Democrats	Maggie Tyrrell	1979	24.0	−2.7
Liberal Democrats	Shirley Anne Holloway	1933	23.4	−3.0
Conservative	Karen Lesley Blick	1735	21.0	+3.1
Conservative	Steve Blick	1624	19.7	+3.7
Labour	Linda Jean Harris	518	6.3	−0.7
Labour	Gary Michael Shane Pepworth	459	5.6	−0.5
Liberal Democrats hold		Swing		
Liberal Democrats hold		Swing		

Westerleigh (1 seat)
Party	Candidate	Votes	%	±%
Liberal Democrats	Claire Louise Young	1175	48.5	−11.5
Conservative	Michaela Sydney Crumpton	1031	42.6	+12.0
Labour	Jonathan Terence Trollope	217	9.0	−0.4
Liberal Democrats hold		Swing		

Winterbourne (2 seats)
Party	Candidate	Votes	%	±%
Conservative	Tim Bowles	2302	28.2	−3.1
Conservative	Martin Manning	1954	24.0	−5.9
Liberal Democrats	Pete Bruce	1099	13.5	+4.9
UKIP	Jeanette Hayter	811	9.9	
Labour	Jo Cranney	754	9.2	−2.4
Labour	Gareth Keel	683	8.4	−1.9
Liberal Democrats	Annette Maria Elizabeth Parsons	554	6.8	−1.5
Conservative hold		Swing		
Conservative hold		Swing		

Woodstock (3 seats)
Party	Candidate	Votes	%	±%
Labour	Andy Perkins	2506	17.1	−4.8
Labour	Pat Rooney	2476	16.9	−4.5
Labour	Gareth Thomas Manson	2328	15.9	−4.8
Conservative	Philip Staples	2059	14.0	+3.6
Conservative	Richard Pope	2000	13.6	+3.5
Conservative	Bips Nathwani	1799	12.3	+3.9
Liberal Democrats	James Pringle Corrigan	641	4.4	+1.0
Liberal Democrats	Patrick John Eagar Thoyts	308	2.1	+0.2
Liberal Democrats	Penelope Ruth Thoyts	294	2.0	+0.1
TUSC	Richard Worth	257	1.8	
Labour hold		Swing		
Labour hold		Swing		
Labour hold		Swing		

Yate Central (2 seats)
Party	Candidate	Votes	%	±%
Liberal Democrats	Sue Walker	1962	26.3	−7.8
Liberal Democrats	Ruth Brenda Davis	1798	24.1	−8.0
Conservative	Roy Garner	982	13.1	+2.8
Conservative	Fred Watts	884	11.8	+2.2
UKIP	Adrian Sutton	831	11.1	
Labour	Michael Paul Mcgrath	532	7.1	−0.6
Labour	Peter David Abraham	481	6.4	−0.1
Liberal Democrats hold		Swing		
Liberal Democrats hold		Swing		

Yate North (3 seats)
Party	Candidate	Votes	%	±%
Liberal Democrats	Mike Drew	2653	16.8	−4.3
Liberal Democrats	Ian William Johnston Blair	2466	15.6	−4.8
Liberal Democrats	John Anthony Davis	2330	14.7	−5.5
Conservative	David Penry Williams	1840	11.6	+3.4
Conservative	Sonia Williams	1725	10.9	+3.0
Conservative	Kion Kevan Northam	1566	9.9	+2.7
UKIP	Steven Ring	1048	6.6	
Labour	Brian Fletcher	676	4.3	−1.0
Labour	Fred Simpson	552	3.5	−1.5
Labour	Alan William Maggs	534	3.4	−1.2
Independent	Mike Dollin	418	2.6	
Liberal Democrats hold		Swing		
Liberal Democrats hold		Swing		
Liberal Democrats hold		Swing		
