= North East Somerset =

UK Parliament constituency (2010–2024)

Coordinates: 51°20′N 2°30′W

- Former county constituency for the House of Commons
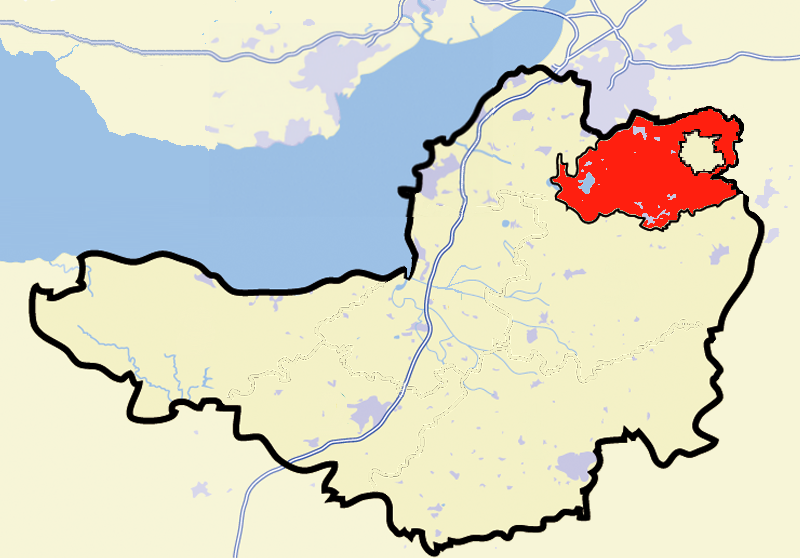
- Location of North East Somerset in Somerset

- Location of Somerset within England
- County: Somerset
- Electorate: 70,070 (2018)
- Major settlements: Chew Magna, Keynsham, Midsomer Norton and Radstock

2010–2024
- Seats: One
- Created from: Wansdyke (19 wards); Bath constituency (two wards)
- Replaced by: North East Somerset and Hanham

North East Somerset was a constituency (Note: A county constituency (for the purposes of election expenses and type of returning officer).) represented in the House of Commons of the UK Parliament from 2010 to 2024. For the whole of its existence its Member of Parliament (MP) was Jacob Rees-Mogg of the Conservative Party. (Note: As with all constituencies, the constituency elects one Member of Parliament (MP) by the first past the post system of election at least every five years.)

The seat was abolished following the 2023 review of Westminster constituencies. For the 2024 general election, the seat was subject to major boundary changes and has been reformed as North East Somerset and Hanham.

== Boundaries ==
Map of boundaries 2010–2024

The constituency covered the part of Bath and North East Somerset District that was not in the Bath constituency and as such contained 18 whole electoral wards and two parishes of Newbridge ward of Bath and North East Somerset:

- Bathavon North – the Civil Parishes ('Parishes') of Batheaston, Bathford, Bathampton, Charlcombe, St Catherine and Swainswick
- Bathavon South – the Parishes of Camerton, Claverton, Combe Hay, Dunkerton, Englishcombe, Freshford, Hinton Charterhouse, Marksbury, Monkton Combe, Priston, Shoscombe, South Stoke and Wellow
- Chew Valley – the Parishes of Chew Magna, Chew Stoke, Compton Martin, Nempnett Thrubwell, Norton Malreward, Stanton Drew, Stowey-Sutton and Ubley
- Clutton and Farmborough – the Parishes of Chelwood, Clutton and Farmborough
- High Littleton – the Parishes of Farrington Gurney and High Littleton
- Keynsham North
- Keynsham South
- Keynsham East
- Mendip – the Parishes of Cameley, East Harptree, Hinton Blewett and West Harptree
- Midsomer Norton North
- Midsomer Norton Redfield
- Newbridge – the Parishes of Kelston and North Stoke
- Paulton – the Parish of Paulton
- Peasedown – the Parish of Peasedown St John
- Publow and Whitchurch – the Parishes of Publow and Whitchurch
- Radstock
- Saltford – the Parishes of Compton Dando, Corston, Newton St Loe and Saltford
- Timsbury – the Parish of Timsbury
- Westfield

Origin of first boundaries

Parliament accepted the Boundary Commission's Fifth Periodic Review of Westminster constituencies which transferred all the electoral wards in Wandsyke constituency save for its four wards in South Gloucestershire to this new seat. (Note: Namely Bitton, Hanham, Longwell Green and Oldland Common) To compensate the new seat gained the whole of the large wards in the valley of the City, Bathavon North, and the rest of Bathavon South, both from the Bath constituency.

=== Abolition ===
The constituency was abolished by the 2023 review of Westminster constituencies, effective as of the general election of July 2024. The majority of the constituency was transferred to a new North East Somerset and Hanham constituency that stretches northwards into the district of South Gloucestershire. South-eastern areas of the constituency, including the communities of Midsomer Norton, Radstock and Peasedown St John, were incorporated into the newly created constituency of Frome and East Somerset, and the Bathavon North ward transferred to Bath.

== Constituency profile ==
This area is marked by significant agriculture and green belts around almost all of its settlements, which consist largely of detached and semi-detached properties, with a low rate of unemployment and negligible social housing tenancy.

An unusually shaped seat that contained all the western part of the Bath and North East Somerset council area, and the rural outskirts of Bath in the east, meaning the Bath constituency was entirely surrounded by a thin belt of North East Somerset. The seat contained some contrasting areas. The northern parts of the seat, especially the town of Keynsham, are commuter areas for Bath and Bristol. To the west the seat is more rural, covering the patchwork of farmland and rural villages that make up the Chew Valley. The southern part around Midsomer Norton and Radstock is part of the old Somerset Coalfield. The last of the coal mines closed in the 1970s, to be replaced by light industry, but the close knit industrial heritage of the area remains.

North East Somerset is estimated to have voted to Leave the European Union by 51.6% in the 2016 referendum on the UK's membership of the EU.

== Members of Parliament ==
Election	Member	Party
2010	Jacob Rees-Mogg	Conservative

== Elections ==
See North East Somerset and Hanham for 2024 general election, and onwards.

=== Elections in the 2010s ===
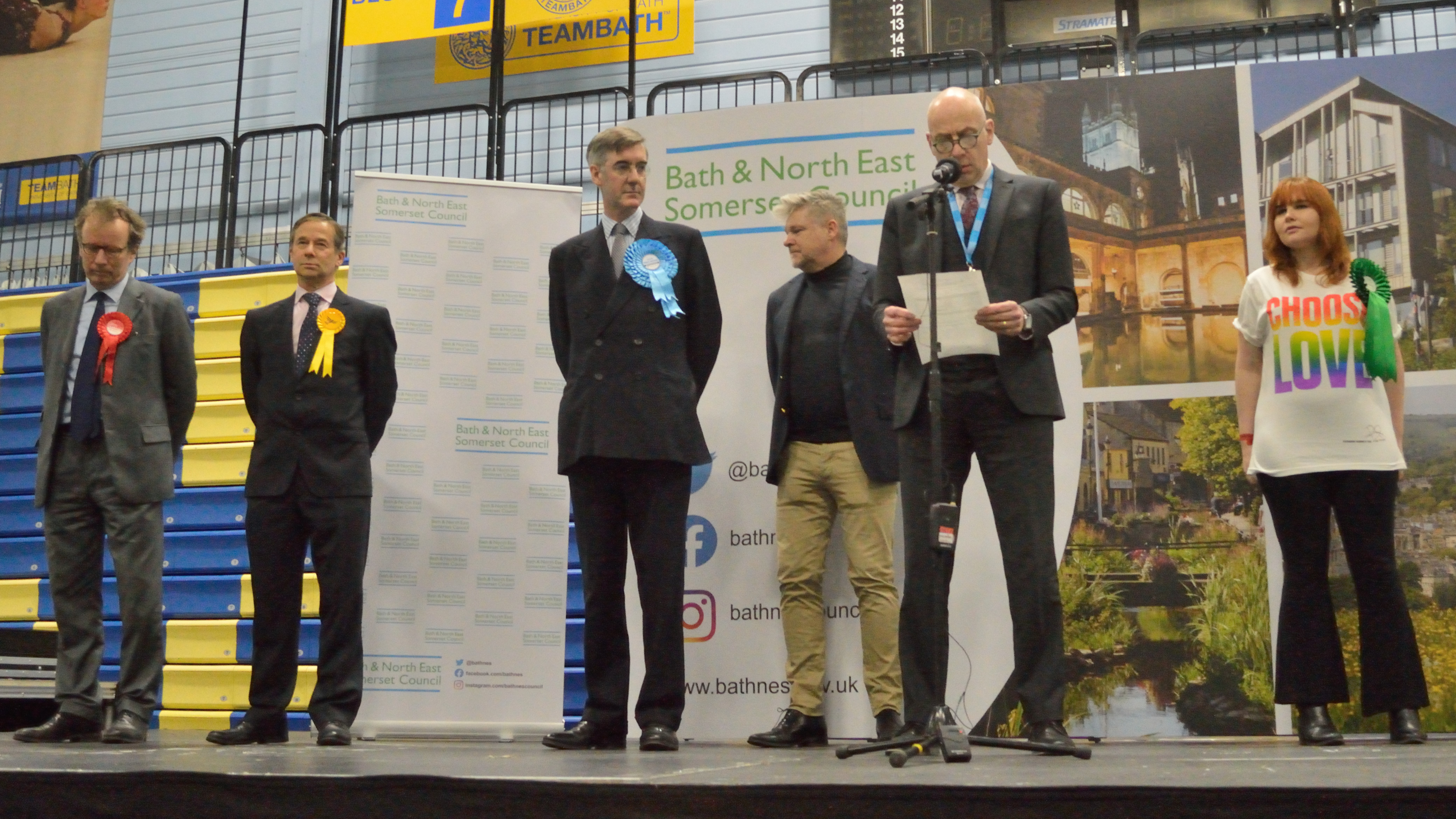
Candidates at the North East Somerset 2019 general election declaration

General election 2019: North East Somerset
Party	Candidate	Votes	%	±%
Conservative	Jacob Rees-Mogg	28,360	50.4	−3.2
Labour	Mark Huband	13,631	24.2	−10.5
Liberal Democrats	Nick Coates	12,422	22.1	+13.8
Green	Fay Whitfield	1,423	2.5	+0.2
Independent	Shaun Hughes	472	0.8	−0.3
Majority		14,729	26.2	+7.3
Turnout		56,308	76.4	+0.7
Conservative hold		Swing	+3.6	

General election 2017: North East Somerset
Party	Candidate	Votes	%	±%
Conservative	Jacob Rees-Mogg	28,992	53.6	+3.8
Labour	Robin Moss	18,757	34.7	+9.9
Liberal Democrats	Manda Rigby	4,461	8.3	+0.4
Green	Sally Calverley	1,245	2.3	−3.2
Independent	Shaun Hughes	588	1.1	New
Majority		10,235	18.9	−5.9
Turnout		54,043	75.7	+2.0
Conservative hold		Swing	−3.0	

General election 2015: North East Somerset
Party	Candidate	Votes	%	±%
Conservative	Jacob Rees-Mogg	25,439	49.8	+8.5
Labour	Todd Foreman	12,690	24.8	−6.9
UKIP	Ernest Blaber	6,150	12.0	+8.6
Liberal Democrats	Wera Hobhouse	4,029	7.9	−14.4
Green	Katy Boyce	2,802	5.5	+4.2
Majority		12,749	25.0	+15.4
Turnout		51,110	73.7	−2.3
Conservative hold		Swing	+7.65	

General election 2010: North East Somerset
Party	Candidate	Votes	%	±%
Conservative	Jacob Rees-Mogg	21,130	41.3	+2.2
Labour	Dan Norris*	16,216	31.7	−7.0
Liberal Democrats	Gail Coleshill	11,433	22.3	+2.7
UKIP	Peter Sandell	1,754	3.4	+1.2
Green	Michael Jay	670	1.3	+1.3
Majority		4,914	9.6	+9.2
Turnout		51,203	76.0	
Conservative win (new seat)				

* Served in the 2005–2010 Parliament as MP for Wansdyke

The changes in vote share are compared to a notional calculation of the 2005 result. Although the Wansdyke seat had been held by Labour for 13 years, this seat was already notionally a Conservative seat by a margin of 0.4%. This means that, if the North East Somerset seat on its new boundaries had been contested in 2005, the Conservatives would have won by a few hundred votes.

== See also ==
- Parliamentary constituencies in Avon
- Wansdyke (abolished) – the predecessor constituency.

== Sources ==
- UKPolling Report – Anthony Wells calculations of notional majorities.
