= 2011 South Gloucestershire Council election =

2011 UK local government election

The 2011 South Gloucestershire Council election took place on 5 May 2011 to elect members of South Gloucestershire unitary authority in England.

== Election result ==
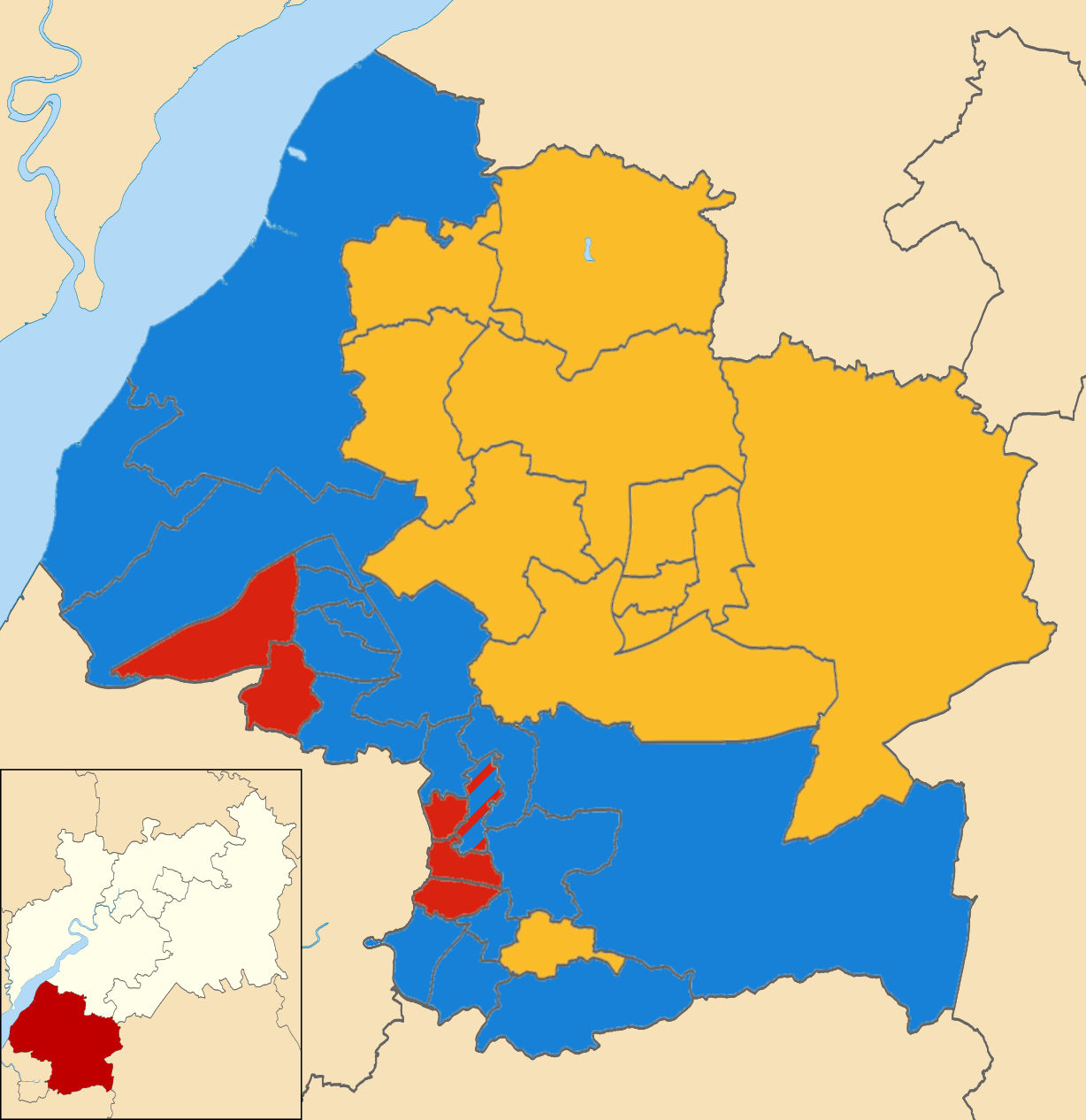
2011 local election results in South Gloucestershire

South Gloucestershire Council election, 2011
Party	Seats	Gains	Losses	Net gain/loss	Seats %	Votes %	Votes	+/−
Conservative	34	3	3	±0	48.5	42.0	80,047	-2.3
Liberal Democrats	21	0	6	-6	30.0	25.5	48,571	-6.0
Labour	15	6	0	+6	21.4	29.8	56,828	+8.1
Independent	0	0	0	±0	0	1.5	2,996	±0
UKIP	0	0	0	±0	0	0.6	1,191	±0
Green	0	0	0	±0	0	0.9	948	±0

== Ward results ==
South Gloucestershire Council composition following the 2011 local elections

In wards that are represented by more than one councillor, electors were given more than one vote each, hence the voter turnout may not match the number of votes cast.

Almondsbury (1 seat)
Party	Candidate	Votes	%	±%
Conservative	Sheila Cook	1068	67.7	−4.9
Liberal Democrats	Andrew Tubb	285	18.0	−2.6
Labour	Robin Horsfall	224	14.2	+7.5
Turnout		1577	50.0	
Conservative hold		Swing		

Bitton (1 seat)
Party	Candidate	Votes	%	±%
Conservative	Erica Williams	667	45.7	−2.9
Liberal Democrats	Mike Thomas	499	34.2	−14.4
Labour	John Graham	292	20.0	+8.9
Turnout		1,458	53.0	
Conservative gain from Liberal Democrats		Swing		

Boyd Valley (2 seats)
Party	Candidate	Votes	%	±%
Conservative	Ben Stokes	1,321	21.6	−8.2
Conservative	Stephen Reade	1,229	20.1	−2.6
Liberal Democrats	Karen Wilkinson	998	16.3	−3.1
Liberal Democrats	Malcolm Watson	981	16.1	+1.4
Labour	Nigel Goldsmith	488	8.0	+3.8
UKIP	Aaron Foot	391	6.4	−0.5
Labour	Roger Jahans-Price	386	6.3	+3.2
UKIP	Anthony Guild	295	5.7	N/A
Turnout		6,089	55.0	
Conservative hold		Swing		
Conservative hold		Swing		

Bradley Stoke Central and Stoke Lodge (2 seats)
Party	Candidate	Votes	%	±%
Conservative	Brian Hopkinson	1,092	25.4	−1.0
Conservative	Sarah Pomfret	1,024	23.8	−1.8
Labour	David Addison	642	14.9	+7.4
Labour	Stanley Sims	515	11.9	+4.6
Liberal Democrats	Dawn Clode	401	9.3	−7.9
Independent	Rebecca Strong	320	7.4	N/A
Liberal Democrats	Luis Cebrian	305	7.0	−8.7
Turnout		4,299	39.0	
Conservative hold		Swing		
Conservative hold		Swing		

Bradley Stoke North (1 seat)
Party	Candidate	Votes	%	±%
Conservative	Ben Walker	562	43.6	
Liberal Democrats	Jon Williams	423	32.8	
Labour	Jonathan Moore	303	23.5	
Turnout		1288	42.2	
Conservative gain from Liberal Democrats		Swing		

Bradley Stoke South (2 seats)
Party	Candidate	Votes	%	±%
Conservative	John Ashe	1,236	24.8	
Conservative	Robert Jones	1,195	24.0	
Labour	Christopher Devitt	717	14.4	
Liberal Democrats	Sarah Drake	649	13.0	
Liberal Democrats	Sachin Singhal	607	12.2	
Labour	Phillip Edwards	570	11.4	
Turnout		4974	41.8	
Conservative hold		Swing		
Conservative hold		Swing		

Charfield (1 seat)
Party	Candidate	Votes	%	±%
Liberal Democrats	John O'Neill	816	55.1	
Conservative	John Buxton	504	34.0	
Labour	Russell Testa	160	10.8	
Turnout		1480	48.6	
Liberal Democrats hold		Swing		

Chipping Sobury (2 seats)
Party	Candidate	Votes	%	±%
Liberal Democrats	Linda Boon	1,606	27.4	
Liberal Democrats	Adrian Rush	1,431	24.4	
Conservative	Paul Wittle	1,198	20.4	
Conservative	Wendy Wittle	1,085	18.5	
Labour	Donald Brownlie	278	4.7	
Labour	Rudi Springer	257	4.3	
Turnout		5855	56.1	
Liberal Democrats hold		Swing		
Liberal Democrats hold		Swing		

Cotswold Edge (1 seat)
Party	Candidate	Votes	%	±%
Liberal Democrats	Sue Hope	902	52.6	
Conservative	Helen Elizabeth Heeley	722	42.1	
Labour	Ruth Mary Jahans-Price	278	16.2	
Turnout		1,715		
Liberal Democrats hold		Swing		

Dodington (2 seats)
Party	Candidate	Votes	%	±%
Liberal Democrats	Dafydd Holbrook	1,340	32.5	
Liberal Democrats	Alan Lawrance	1,324	32.1	
Conservative	Jason Colin Rundle	452	11.0	
Conservative	Christine Ann Jarvis	429	10.4	
Labour	Michael John Byfield	294	7.1	
Labour	David George Pearce	285	6.9	
Turnout		4,124		
Liberal Democrats hold		Swing		
Liberal Democrats hold		Swing		

Downend (3 seats)
Party	Candidate	Votes	%	±%
Conservative	Janet Esme Biggin	2,312	19.6	
Conservative	Jon Hunt	2,232	19.0	
Conservative	Kathy Morris	2,007	17.1	
Labour	Wendy Bowrey	1,309	11.1	
Labour	Jo Cranney	1,204	10.2	
Labour	Phil Todd	1,137	9.7	
Liberal Democrats	Graeme Edward	593	5.0	
Liberal Democrats	Hilary Kitchen	519	4.4	
Liberal Democrats	Sandra Valerie Hobson	455	3.9	
Turnout		11,768		
Conservative hold		Swing		
Conservative hold		Swing		
Conservative hold		Swing		

Emersons Green (3 seats)
Party	Candidate	Votes	%	±%
Conservative	Colin John Hunt	1,993	18.9	
Conservative	Dave Kearns	1,967	18.7	
Conservative	James Lee Hunt	1,895	18.0	
Labour	Alan Maggs	1,169	11.1	
Labour	John Hunt	1,028	9.8	
Labour	Peter Goodman	1,022	9.7	
Liberal Democrats	Andrew Paul Riches	600	5.7	
Liberal Democrats	Teresa Constance Lawrance	439	4.2	
Liberal Democrats	Edith Kinnaird Crowe	429	4.1	
Turnout		10,542		
Conservative hold		Swing		
Conservative hold		Swing		
Conservative hold		Swing		

Filton (3 seats)
Party	Candidate	Votes	%	±%
Labour	Adam Paul Monk	1,234	13.9	
Labour	Ian Keith Mark Scott	1,218	13.7	
Labour	Roger Malcolm Hutchinson	1,200	13.5	
Conservative	Brian Andrew Freeguard	1,150	13.0	
Conservative	David Bell	1,117	12.6	
Conservative	Rikki Teml	972	11.0	
Green	Diana Lewen Warner	443	5.0	
Independent	John Tucker	298	3.4	
Liberal Democrats	Sheila Mead	264	3.0	
Liberal Democrats	Richard Craig	263	3.0	
Independent	Alan David Tink	257	2.9	
Independent	Philip Henry Winter	244	2.7	
Liberal Democrats	Alan John Garland	215	2.4	
Turnout		8,875		
Labour hold		Swing		
Labour gain from Conservative		Swing		
Labour gain from Conservative		Swing		

Frampton Cotterell (2 seats)
Party	Candidate	Votes	%	±%
Liberal Democrats	Dave Hockey	1,638	27.9	
Liberal Democrats	Pat Hockey	1,489	25.3	
Conservative	Mark Robert Douglas Forsyth	1,027	17.5	
Conservative	Linda Christine Williams	956	16.3	
Labour	Susan Mary Keel	402	6.8	
Labour	Terence Leslie Trollope	363	6.2	
Turnout		5,875		
Liberal Democrats hold		Swing		
Liberal Democrats hold		Swing		

Frenchay and Stoke Park (2 seats)
Party	Candidate	Votes	%	±%
Conservative	Trevor John Jones	934	29.2	
Conservative	Bob Pullin	911	28.5	
Labour	Matthew James Brown	444	13.9	
Labour	Benhamin George Scott	383	12.0	
Liberal Democrats	Dave Cope	307	9.6	
Liberal Democrats	John Anthony Davis	223	7.0	
Turnout		3,202		
Conservative hold		Swing		
Conservative hold		Swing		

Hanham (3 seats)
Party	Candidate	Votes	%	±%
Conservative	Heather Goddard	1,996	19.8	
Conservative	John Goddard	1,925	19.1	
Conservative	June Patricia Bamford	1,917	19.0	
Labour	Gerry McAllister	1,285	12.7	
Labour	Julie Elizabeth Walker	1,205	11.9	
Labour	Richard James McCarthy	1,108	11.0	
Liberal Democrats	Jeff Dando	302	3.0	
Liberal Democrats	Christine Dianne Thomas	183	1.8	
Liberal Democrats	Julian David Lord	170	1.7	
Turnout		10,091		
Conservative hold		Swing		
Conservative hold		Swing		
Conservative hold		Swing		

Kings Chase (3 seats)
Party	Candidate	Votes	%	±%
Labour	Pat Apps	1,594	17.3	
Labour	Terry Walker	1,586	17.2	
Labour	Bill Bowrey	1,518	16.5	
Conservative	Jo Shepherd	1,280	13.9	
Conservative	Rick Pope	1,256	13.6	
Conservative	Kit Terrington	1,240	13.4	
Liberal Democrats	Joan Bates Reeves	298	3.2	
Liberal Democrats	Janet Lesley Hart	252	2.7	
Liberal Democrats	Anthony William Stuart Davis	201	2.2	
Turnout		9,225		
Labour hold		Swing		
Labour hold		Swing		
Labour hold		Swing		

Ladden Brook (1 seat)
Party	Candidate	Votes	%	±%
Liberal Democrats	Howard John Alan Gawler	844	54.2	
Conservative	Brian Taylor	369	23.7	
Labour	Bob Lomas	343	22.0	
Turnout		1,556		
Liberal Democrats hold		Swing		

Longwell Green (2 seats)
Party	Candidate	Votes	%	±%
Conservative	John Francis Calway	1,745	33.5	
Conservative	Christine Price	1,512	29.0	
Labour	Janice Suffolk	700	13.4	
Labour	Mary Judith Perkins	681	13.1	
Liberal Democrats	Andrew James Thomas	302	5.8	
Liberal Democrats	Karen Jane Ross	270	5.2	
Turnout		5,210		
Conservative hold		Swing		
Conservative hold		Swing		

Oldland Common (2 seats)
Party	Candidate	Votes	%	±%
Liberal Democrats	Jane Alison Allinson	963	20.4	
Liberal Democrats	Marc Daniel Scawen	843	17.9	
Labour	Malcolm Bridge	749	15.9	
Conservative	Don Lee	739	15.7	
Labour	Roger William Coales	725	15.4	
Conservative	Paul Robert Hughes	703	14.9	
Turnout		4,722		
Liberal Democrats hold		Swing		
Liberal Democrats hold		Swing		

Parkwall (2 seats)
Party	Candidate	Votes	%	±%
Conservative	Tony Olpin	1,141	23.9	
Conservative	Nick Barrett	1,124	23.5	
Labour	Martin Farmer	1,017	21.3	
Labour	Ron Hardie	1,000	20.9	
Liberal Democrats	Lois Barbara Nicks	272	5.7	
Liberal Democrats	Grace Miriam Boddy	228	4.8	
Turnout		4,782		
Conservative hold		Swing		
Conservative hold		Swing		

Patchway (3 seats)
Party	Candidate	Votes	%	±%
Labour	Eve Orpen	997	15.3	
Labour	Keith Walker	950	14.6	
Labour	Sam William Scott	911	14.0	
Conservative	Allan Martin Taylor	662	10.2	
Conservative	Ros Messenger	657	10.1	
Conservative	Roger Avenin	585	9.0	
Liberal Democrats	Ken Dando	538	8.3	
Liberal Democrats	Jan Woodley	493	7.6	
Liberal Democrats	Clare Michelle Singleton	479	7.4	
Independent	Charles Edward Horton	232	3.6	
Turnout		6,504		
Labour gain from Liberal Democrats		Swing		
Labour gain from Liberal Democrats		Swing		
Labour gain from Liberal Democrats		Swing		

Pilning and Severn Beach (1 seat)
Party	Candidate	Votes	%	±%
Conservative	Robert Charles Griffin	627	46.0	
Liberal Democrats	Peter Laurence Tyzack	538	39.5	
Labour	Julie Snelling	197	14.5	
Turnout		1,362		
Conservative gain from Liberal Democrats		Swing		

Rodway (3 seats)
Party	Candidate	Votes	%	±%
Labour	Michael Richard Bell	1,742	16.1	
Conservative	Carol Beatrice McCarthy	1,645	15.2	
Conservative	Kevin Michael Seager	1,629	15.1	
Labour	April Janet Lilian Clare Begley	1,595	14.8	
Labour	Neil Simon Willmott	1,507	13.9	
Conservative	Adrian George Millward	1,471	13.6	
UKIP	Neil Gareth Burgess	505	4.7	
Liberal Democrats	Arthur Frank Adams	256	2.4	
Liberal Democrats	Martin William Monk	234	2.2	
Liberal Democrats	Christine Joan Willmore	222	2.1	
Turnout		10,806		
Labour gain from Conservative		Swing		
Conservative hold		Swing		
Conservative hold		Swing		

Severn (1 seat)
Party	Candidate	Votes	%	±%
Conservative	Matthew Robert Riddle	1,325	73.8	
Liberal Democrats	Alan Dallas Moller	337	18.8	
Labour	Jane Evelyn Bradshaw	133	7.4	
Turnout		1,795		
Conservative hold		Swing		

Siston (1 seat)
Party	Candidate	Votes	%	±%
Conservative	Ian Phillip Adams	701	52.0	
Labour	Olive Maggs	447	35.4	
Liberal Democrats	Edward Roger Allinson	170	12.6	
Turnout		1,348		
Conservative hold		Swing		

Staple Hill (2 seats)
Party	Candidate	Votes	%	±%
Labour	Shirley Potts	1,381	31.6	
Labour	Ian Boulton	1,330	30.4	
Conservative	Elizabeth Shepherd	692	15.8	
Conservative	John Sullivan	643	14.7	
Liberal Democrats	Peter Heaney	178	4.1	
Liberal Democrats	Shaunna Plunkett-Levin	152	3.5	
Turnout		4,376		
Labour hold		Swing		
Labour hold		Swing		

Stoke Gifford (3 seats)
Party	Candidate	Votes	%	±%
Conservative	Brian John Allinson	1,944	18.3	
Conservative	Keith Cranney	1,766	16.6	
Conservative	Justin Howells	1,601	15.1	
Labour	Diane Vowles	1,210	11.4	
Labour	Anthony Garth Davis	1,162	10.9	
Labour	David Jonathan Tiley	1,055	9.9	
Liberal Democrats	Becky Williams	520	4.9	
Green	Richard William Burton	505	4.8	
Liberal Democrats	Andrew Terence White	471	4.4	
Liberal Democrats	Ken Graupner	380	3.6	
Turnout		10,614		
Conservative hold		Swing		
Conservative hold		Swing		
Conservative hold		Swing		

Thornbury North (2 seats)
Party	Candidate	Votes	%	±%
Liberal Democrats	Clare Mary Fardell	1,434	20.9	
Liberal Democrats	Neil Creighton Halsall	1,340	19.5	
Conservative	Mike Ball	954	13.9	
Independent	Vincent Francis Costello	844	12.3	
Conservative	Quentin Killey	834	12.2	
Independent	Rob Hudson	801	11.7	
Labour	Sonia Charlotte Jackson	330	4.8	
Labour	Karen Julie Cole	327	4.8	
Turnout		6,864		
Liberal Democrats hold		Swing		
Liberal Democrats hold		Swing		

Thornbury South and Alveston (2 seats)
Party	Candidate	Votes	%	±%
Liberal Democrats	Shirley Anne Holloway	1,654	26.7	
Liberal Democrats	Maggie Tyrrell	1,634	26.4	
Conservative	Graham Barley	1,106	17.9	
Conservative	Karen Susan McCarter	989	16.0	
Labour	Robert William Hall	435	7.0	
Labour	Jane Wheelock	378	6.1	
Turnout		6,196		
Liberal Democrats hold		Swing		
Liberal Democrats hold		Swing		

Westerleigh (1 seat)
Party	Candidate	Votes	%	±%
Liberal Democrats	Claire Louise Young	986	60.0	
Conservative	Martyn John Radnedge	503	30.6	
Labour	Gareth Vaughan George Keel	155	9.4	
Turnout		1,644		
Liberal Democrats hold		Swing		

Winterbourne (2 seats)
Party	Candidate	Votes	%	±%
Conservative	John Peter Godwin	1,704	31.3	
Conservative	Tim Bowles	1,630	29.9	
Labour	Ann Palmer	632	11.6	
Labour	Ronald Ian Palmer	563	10.3	
Liberal Democrats	Sandra Yvonne O'Neill	466	8.6	
Liberal Democrats	Sarah Elizabeth Turley	452	8.3	
Turnout		5,447		
Conservative hold		Swing		
Conservative hold		Swing		

Woodstock (3 seats)
Party	Candidate	Votes	%	±%
Labour	Pat Rooney	2,047	21.9	
Labour	Andy Perkins	1,996	21.4	
Labour	Gareth Thomas Manson	1,937	20.7	
Conservative	Dave Lake	973	10.4	
Conservative	Lewis Snell	946	10.1	
Conservative	Bips Nathwani	782	8.4	
Liberal Democrats	James Pringle Corrigan	317	3.4	
Liberal Democrats	Mohibu Aziz Chowdhry	176	1.9	
Liberal Democrats	Wulstan John Newton Perks	174	1.9	
Turnout		9,348		
Labour hold		Swing		
Labour hold		Swing		
Labour hold		Swing		

Yate Central (2 seats)
Party	Candidate	Votes	%	±%
Liberal Democrats	Sue Walker	1,601	34.1	
Liberal Democrats	Ruth Brenda Davis	1,506	32.1	
Conservative	Cynthia Marie Watts	484	10.3	
Conservative	Fred Watts	451	9.6	
Labour	Michael John Chivers	360	7.7	
Labour	Dennis Powsland Beer	295	6.3	
Turnout		4,697		
Liberal Democrats hold		Swing		
Liberal Democrats hold		Swing		

Yate North (3 seats)
Party	Candidate	Votes	%	±%
Liberal Democrats	Mike Drew	2,304	21.1	
Liberal Democrats	Ian Blair	2,223	20.4	
Liberal Democrats	Mike Robbins	2,207	20.2	
Conservative	Kion Kevan Northam	891	8.2	
Conservative	David Penry Williams	864	7.9	
Conservative	Sonia Gertrude Williams	784	7.2	
Labour	Kath Langley	581	5.3	
Labour	Michael Paul McGrath	544	5.0	
Labour	Colin Ronald Burgess	505	4.6	
Turnout		10,903		
Liberal Democrats hold		Swing		
Liberal Democrats hold		Swing		
Liberal Democrats hold		Swing		
