= 2023 South Gloucestershire Council election =

Local Election in England

- 4 May 2023

All 61 seats to South Gloucestershire Council 31 seats needed for a majority

	First party	Second party
Leader	Toby Savage	Claire Young
Party	Conservative	Liberal Democrats
Last election	33 seats, 42.4%	17 seats, 33.2%
Seats won	23	20
Seat change	▼10	▲3
Popular vote	58,239	55,012
Percentage	35.9%	33.9%
Swing	▼6.5%	▲0.7%
	Third party	Fourth party
Leader	Pat Rooney
Party	Labour	Independent
Last election	11 seats, 19.1%	0 seats, 0%
Seats won	17	1
Seat change	▲6	▲1
Popular vote	39,257	2,346
Percentage	24.2%	1.4%
Swing	▲5.1%	0.0%
- Winner of each seat at the 2023 South Gloucestershire Council election

- Diagram to show the councillor distribution by party after the 2023 election
Leader before election
Toby Savage
Conservative
Leader after election
Claire Young
Liberal Democrats
No overall control

The 2023 South Gloucestershire Council election took place on 4 May 2023 to elect members of South Gloucestershire Council in England. This was on the same day as other local elections across England.

The Conservatives lost control of the council to no overall control. A Liberal Democrat and Labour coalition subsequently formed to take control of the council.

== Overview ==
Prior to the election the Conservatives had a majority on the council, holding 33 of the 61 seats. Their group leader Toby Savage, who had been leader of the council since 2018, chose not to stand for re-election. The Labour group leader Pat Rooney also chose not to stand for re-election.

Following the election the Conservatives remained the largest party but made a net loss of ten seats, putting the council under no overall control. The Liberal Democrats and Labour agreed to form a coalition to run the council. At the subsequent annual council meeting on 24 May 2023 the Liberal Democrat group leader Claire Young was appointed leader of the council, and the new Labour group leader Ian Boulton was appointed co-leader of the council. The Conservatives chose Sam Bromiley to be their new leader in opposition.

== Results summary ==
2023 South Gloucestershire Council election
Party	Candidates	Seats	Gains	Losses	Net gain/loss	Seats %	Votes %	Votes	+/−
Conservative	61	23	1	11	▼10	37.7	35.9	58,239	–6.5
Liberal Democrats	61	20	4	1	▲3	32.8	33.9	55,012	+0.7
Labour	43	17	7	1	▲6	27.9	24.2	39,257	+5.1
Independent	6	1	1	0	▲1	1.6	1.4	2,346	±0.0
Green	16	0	0	0	Steady	0.0	4.2	6,847	+2.1
Reform	2	0	0	0	Steady	0.0	0.2	329	N/A
National Housing Party No More Refugees	1	0	0	0	Steady	0.0	0.1	228	N/A

== Ward results ==
Sitting councillors are marked with an asterisk (*).

=== Bitton and Oldland Common ===
Bitton and Oldland Common (2 seats)
Party	Candidate	Votes	%	±%
Conservative	Paul Hughes*	899	41.7	−5.3
Conservative	Erica Williams*	833	38.6	−7.9
Labour	Darren Langley	711	33.0	+7.6
Green	Peter Hallett	521	24.2	+8.5
Liberal Democrats	Kenton Boon	373	17.3	+0.6
Green	Sarah Freeman	361	16.7	N/A
Liberal Democrats	Stanley Perry	288	13.4	−0.4
Turnout		2,156	30	▲1
Conservative hold				
Conservative hold				

=== Boyd Valley ===
Boyd Valley (2 seats)
Party	Candidate	Votes	%	±%
Liberal Democrats	Marilyn Palmer	1,316	49.3	+9.7
Conservative	Ben Stokes*	1,234	46.2	−6.2
Conservative	Steve Reade*	1,211	45.4	−7.2
Liberal Democrats	Neil Willmott	1,130	42.3	+9.2
Reform	Andy Banwell	155	5.8	N/A
Turnout		2,669	38	▲2
Liberal Democrats gain from Conservative				
Conservative hold				

=== Bradley Stoke North ===
Bradley Stoke North (2 seats)
Party	Candidate	Votes	%	±%
Conservative	Terry Cullen	1,062	39.2	−1.6
Conservative	Franklin Owusu-Antwi*	932	34.4	−3.8
Labour	Nigel Goldsmith	765	28.3	+6.5
Labour	Ges Rosenberg	731	27.0	+5.6
Independent	Sarah Pomfret*	483	17.8	−23.0
Green	James Nelson	457	16.9	N/A
Liberal Democrats	Drew Clayton	354	13.1	−9.1
Liberal Democrats	Wendy Tomasin	211	7.8	−7.3
Reform	Thomas Crawley	174	6.4	N/A
Turnout		2,706	33	▲4
Conservative hold				
Conservative hold				

=== Bradley Stoke South ===
Bradley Stoke South (2 seats)
Party	Candidate	Votes	%	±%
Labour	John Bradbury	969	45.0	+24.2
Conservative	Ben Randles	915	42.5	−0.6
Conservative	Roger Avenin*	895	41.6	−1.0
Labour	Kulwinder Sappal	764	35.5	+11.3
Liberal Democrats	Allan Moller	285	13.2	−1.7
Liberal Democrats	Guy Rawlinson	264	12.3	+0.1
Turnout		2,151	32	▲6
Labour gain from Conservative				
Conservative hold				

=== Charfield ===
Charfield (1 seat)
Party	Candidate	Votes	%	±%
Liberal Democrats	John O`Neill*	903	70.7	−2.6
Conservative	Michaela Crumpton	288	22.6	+1.5
Green	Pete Watts	86	6.7	+1.1
Majority		615	48.1	
Turnout		1,277	35	▼2
Liberal Democrats hold		Swing		

=== Charlton and Cribbs ===
Charlton and Cribbs (3 seats)
Party	Candidate	Votes	%	±%
Labour	Sam Scott	695	42.4	+11.8
Conservative	Sanjay Shambhu*	683	41.6	+2.1
Conservative	Jo Buddharaju*	614	37.4	−1.4
Conservative	Brian Hopkinson*	603	36.8	−1.0
Labour	Ravi Ravi	507	30.9	+1.4
Labour	Viljo Wilding	437	26.6	+0.1
Independent	Pete Knight	375	22.9	N/A
Independent	Roger Loveridge	315	19.2	N/A
Liberal Democrats	John Ford	119	7.3	−7.2
Liberal Democrats	Matthew Stringer	117	7.1	−6.9
Liberal Democrats	Dave Hockey	104	6.3	−8.1
Turnout		1,640	26	
Labour gain from Conservative				
Conservative hold				
Conservative hold				

=== Chipping Sodbury and Cotswold Edge ===
Chipping Sodbury and Cotswold Edge (2 seats)
Party	Candidate	Votes	%	±%
Liberal Democrats	Adrian Rush*	1,687	45.9	−1.5
Conservative	Becky Romaine	1,680	45.7	+4.5
Conservative	Roisin Hall	1,678	45.6	−0.9
Liberal Democrats	Patricia Trull*	1,647	44.8	−2.1
Labour	Ian Lowe	336	9.1	+3.5
Turnout		3,677	47	
Liberal Democrats hold				
Conservative gain from Liberal Democrats				

=== Dodington ===
Dodington (2 seats)
Party	Candidate	Votes	%	±%
Liberal Democrats	Louise Harris*	1,479	67.5	−0.5
Liberal Democrats	Cheryl Kirby	1,432	65.4	−2.9
Conservative	Rachel Welsh	517	23.6	−5.5
Conservative	Jo Nicholson	516	23.6	−3.9
National Housing Party No More Refugees	Callum Leat	228	10.4	N/A
Turnout		2,191	29	
Liberal Democrats hold				
Liberal Democrats hold				

=== Emersons Green ===
Emersons Green (3 seats)
Party	Candidate	Votes	%	±%
Labour	Katrina Al-Hassan	1,614	42.5	+10.2
Conservative	Rachael Hunt*	1,532	40.3	−3.8
Labour	Ron Hardie	1,508	39.7	+10.9
Labour	Sadik Al-Hassan	1,498	39.4	+5.2
Conservative	Colin Hunt*	1,482	39.0	−4.0
Conservative	Alka Mehta-Graham	1,183	31.1	−14.4
Green	Sian Harris	876	23.1	N/A
Liberal Democrats	Gabriella Miron	424	11.2	−8.9
Liberal Democrats	Susan Walker	324	8.5	−10.3
Liberal Democrats	Laurence Walker	306	8.1	−6.6
Turnout		3,799	31	▲3
Labour gain from Conservative				
Conservative hold				
Labour gain from Conservative				

=== Filton ===
Filton (2 seats)
Party	Candidate	Votes	%	±%
Labour	Adam Monk*	1,114	51.1	+17.6
Labour	Alex Doyle	961	44.1	+11.9
Green	Dan Boardman	485	22.2	+8.3
Conservative	Esther Adjeivi	476	21.8	−10.4
Conservative	Frederic Contenot	424	19.4	−6.2
Green	Jenny Vernon	299	13.7	+3.3
Independent	Andy Robinson	219	10.0	N/A
Liberal Democrats	Martin Joinson	185	8.5	−2.1
Liberal Democrats	Richard Emmerson	107	4.9	−2.2
Turnout		2,181	29	
Labour hold				
Labour gain from Conservative				

=== Frampton Cotterell ===
Frampton Cotterell (3 seats)
Party	Candidate	Votes	%	±%
Liberal Democrats	Claire Young*	2,556	57.4	+4.1
Liberal Democrats	Tristan Clark*	2,331	52.3	+3.8
Liberal Democrats	Jon Lean*	2,190	49.1	+3.6
Conservative	Tom Howell	1,664	37.3	−1.7
Conservative	Tim Niblett	1,615	36.2	−0.1
Conservative	Andy Pullen	1,592	35.7	±0.0
Green	Carolina Echegaray	444	10.0	N/A
Labour	Roger Millard	283	6.4	−0.2
Labour	Jonathan Trollope	247	5.5	±0.0
Turnout		4,456	43	
Liberal Democrats hold				
Liberal Democrats hold				
Liberal Democrats hold				

=== Frenchay and Downend ===
Frenchay and Downend (3 seats)
Party	Candidate	Votes	%	±%
Liberal Democrats	Raj Sood	1,994	43.7	+21.6
Conservative	Ben Burton*	1,780	39.0	−9.4
Conservative	Liz Brennan	1,678	36.8	−9.9
Liberal Democrats	David Eldridge	1,673	36.6	+20.4
Conservative	David Griffiths*	1,622	35.5	−8.1
Liberal Democrats	John Tansey	1,487	32.6	+17.5
Labour	Jacky Dockerty	1,034	22.7	−4.4
Labour	Mike Richards	1,033	22.6	−1.0
Labour	Andrew Smith	858	18.8	−3.2
Turnout		4,565	43	
Liberal Democrats gain from Conservative				
Conservative hold				
Conservative hold				

=== Hanham ===
Hanham (3 seats)
Party	Candidate	Votes	%	±%
Conservative	June Bamford*	1,525	46.7	−2.9
Conservative	Brenda Langley*	1,455	44.5	−2.3
Labour	April Begley	1,336	40.9	+17.1
Conservative	Matt Pitts	1,314	40.2	−2.8
Labour	Michael Newman	1,195	36.6	+12.9
Green	Kelly Allen	651	19.9	+0.1
Green	William Huddy	543	16.6	−3.0
Green	Daniel Johnston	385	11.8	−5.7
Liberal Democrats	John Gawn	275	8.4	+0.9
Liberal Democrats	Margaret Marshall	254	7.8	+0.4
Liberal Democrats	Patrick Thoyts	172	5.3	−1.3
Turnout		3,268	33	
Conservative hold				
Conservative hold				
Labour gain from Conservative				

=== Kingswood ===
Kingswood (2 seats)
Party	Candidate	Votes	%	±%
Labour	Leigh Ingham	901	57.6	+9.2
Labour	Sean Rhodes	848	54.3	+12.5
Conservative	Ken Dando	469	30.0	−5.2
Conservative	Jayashri Krishnesh Chandar	361	23.1	−11.7
Liberal Democrats	Susan Hope	202	12.9	−3.2
Liberal Democrats	Mark Poarch	193	12.3	−2.6
Turnout		1,563	24	
Labour hold				
Labour hold				

=== Longwell Green ===
Longwell Green (2 seats)
Party	Candidate	Votes	%	±%
Conservative	Carol Strange	1,442	56.3	−5.3
Conservative	Kristopher Murphy	1,170	45.7	−8.9
Liberal Democrats	Edward Allinson	906	35.4	+22.2
Independent	Christine Price*	626	24.4	−37.2
Liberal Democrats	Crispin Allard	621	24.2	+12.5
Turnout		2,561	34	
Conservative hold				
Conservative hold				

=== New Cheltenham ===
New Cheltenham (2 seats)
Party	Candidate	Votes	%	±%
Labour	Matt Palmer	936	52.8	+10.8
Labour	Sandie Davis*	907	51.2	+7.6
Conservative	Ian Adams	664	37.5	−3.6
Conservative	Gagan Singh	546	30.8	−6.9
Liberal Democrats	Ruth Davis	204	11.5	−1.0
Liberal Democrats	Richard Parkinson	152	8.6	−3.4
Turnout		1,773	27	
Labour hold				
Labour hold				

=== Parkwall and Warmley ===
Parkwall and Warmley (2 seats)
Party	Candidate	Votes	%	±%
Conservative	Liz Bromiley*	914	48.0	+1.1
Conservative	Sam Bromiley*	890	46.7	+3.5
Labour	Martin Farmer	801	42.1	+8.1
Labour	Kenneth Rabone	699	36.7	+6.3
Liberal Democrats	Philippa Marsden	213	11.2	+1.7
Liberal Democrats	Hossein Pirooz	193	10.1	+2.4
Turnout		1,904	27	
Conservative hold				
Conservative hold				

=== Patchway Coniston ===
Patchway Coniston (1 seat)
Party	Candidate	Votes	%	±%
Independent	Isobel Walker	328	35.3	N/A
Labour	Dayley Lawrence	323	34.8	−1.6
Conservative	Simon Jones	186	20.0	−5.3
Green	Matthew Pash	55	5.9	N/A
Liberal Democrats	Joanna Wallis	37	4.0	−8.8
Majority		5	<1	
Turnout		929	24	
Independent gain from Labour				

=== Pilning and Severn Beach ===
Pilning and Severn Beach (1 seat)
Party	Candidate	Votes	%	±%
Liberal Democrats	Simon Johnson	479	40.8	+34.0
Conservative	Simon Begby	447	38.1	−3.6
Labour	Andy Segal	247	21.1	+3.3
Majority		32	2.7	
Turnout		1,173	32	
Liberal Democrats gain from Conservative				

=== Severn Vale ===
Severn Vale (2 seats)
Party	Candidate	Votes	%	±%
Liberal Democrats	Tony Williams	1,537	46.4	+14.9
Conservative	Matthew Riddle*	1,528	46.1	−8.5
Liberal Democrats	Mark Oaten	1,435	43.3	+11.9
Conservative	Keith Burchell*	1,325	40.0	−7.3
Labour	Abigail Curtis	307	9.3	+3.0
Labour	Naomi Carroll	229	6.9	+1.0
Turnout		3,314	44	
Liberal Democrats gain from Conservative				
Conservative hold				

=== Staple Hill and Mangotsfield ===
Staple Hill and Mangotsfield (3 seats)
Party	Candidate	Votes	%	±%
Labour	Ian Boulton*	2,331	70.5	+12.1
Labour	Michael Bell*	2,153	65.1	+12.5
Labour	Katie Cooper*	2,014	60.9	+12.2
Conservative	Andy O'Hara	789	23.9	−8.2
Conservative	Andrew Shore	604	18.3	−10.5
Conservative	Anil Mishra	556	16.8	−8.0
Liberal Democrats	Andrew Daer	337	10.2	+0.1
Liberal Democrats	Brenda Allen	228	6.9	−3.1
Liberal Democrats	Gabrielle Davis	222	6.7	−3.2
Turnout		3,307	30	
Labour hold				
Labour hold				
Labour hold				

=== Stoke Gifford ===
Stoke Gifford (3 seats)
Party	Candidate	Votes	%	±%
Labour	David Addison	1,530	40.6	+12.0
Conservative	Keith Cranney*	1,440	38.2	−12.1
Conservative	Neel Das Gupta	1,379	36.6	−8.2
Labour	Brian Mead	1,358	36.0	+12.8
Conservative	Tony Griffiths	1,349	35.8	−4.8
Labour	Daniel Harris	1,289	34.2	+11.6
Liberal Democrats	John Williams	927	24.6	+5.2
Liberal Democrats	Kimberley Stansfield	867	23.0	+4.8
Liberal Democrats	Karl Tomasin	693	18.4	+0.7
Turnout		3,772	35	
Labour gain from Conservative				
Conservative hold				
Conservative hold				

=== Stoke Park and Cheswick ===
Stoke Park and Cheswick (1 seat)
Party	Candidate	Votes	%	±%
Liberal Democrats	Ayrden Pocock	466	46.8	−3.9
Labour	Ryan Coyle-Larner	318	31.9	+14.2
Conservative	Prasanna Ramarashnan	212	21.3	−10.3
Majority		148	14.9	
Turnout		996	31	
Liberal Democrats hold		Swing		

=== Thornbury ===
Thornbury (3 seats)
Party	Candidate	Votes	%	±%
Liberal Democrats	Maggie Tyrrell*	2,718	62.6	−8.2
Liberal Democrats	Chris Davies	2,682	61.8	−9.1
Liberal Democrats	Jayne Stansfield*	2,679	61.7	−6.2
Green	Jen Gash	1,020	23.5	N/A
Labour	Alasdair Weeks	761	17.5	N/A
Conservative	Olivia Owusu-Antwi	704	16.2	−11.9
Conservative	Janet Buxton	680	15.7	−9.4
Conservative	John Buxton	672	15.5	−7.5
Turnout		4,342	40	
Liberal Democrats hold				
Liberal Democrats hold				
Liberal Democrats hold				

=== Winterbourne ===
Winterbourne (2 seats)
Party	Candidate	Votes	%	±%
Conservative	Nic Labuschagne*	889	43.3	−11.6
Conservative	Trevor Jones*	819	39.9	−10.3
Liberal Democrats	Peter Bruce	678	33.0	+4.6
Liberal Democrats	David Goodwin	572	27.9	+1.7
Labour	John Lloyd	342	16.7	−0.8
Labour	Beth McKinlay	290	14.1	−2.9
Green	Alan Lankester	240	11.7	N/A
Green	David Vernon	158	7.7	N/A
Turnout		2,052	37	
Conservative hold				
Conservative hold				

=== Woodstock ===
Woodstock (2 seats)
Party	Candidate	Votes	%	±%
Labour	Alison Evans*	1,039	56.0	+11.4
Labour	Ian Scott	928	50.1	+5.2
Conservative	Jack Groenewald	545	29.4	−7.6
Conservative	Kamni Shambhu	477	25.7	−7.7
Liberal Democrats	Jim Corrigan	335	18.1	+1.1
Liberal Democrats	Tony Davis	209	11.3	−2.4
Turnout		1,854	25	
Labour hold				
Labour hold				

=== Yate Central ===
Yate Central (2 seats)
Party	Candidate	Votes	%	±%
Liberal Democrats	Sandra Emms	1,269	63.3	−2.8
Liberal Democrats	John Davis	1,231	61.4	−2.2
Conservative	Marian Gilpin	584	29.1	+3.4
Conservative	Joanne Lewis	470	23.5	−2.3
Green	Christopher Jackson	266	13.3	N/A
Turnout		2,004	31	
Liberal Democrats hold				
Liberal Democrats hold				

=== Yate North ===
Yate North (3 seats)
Party	Candidate	Votes	%	±%
Liberal Democrats	Mike Drew*	2,282	73.3	+11.7
Liberal Democrats	Chris Willmore	2,230	71.6	+13.6
Liberal Democrats	Ben Nutland*	2,228	71.5	+14.2
Conservative	Sonia Williams	759	24.4	−6.7
Conservative	Matt Lewis	734	23.6	−6.8
Conservative	David Williams	733	23.5	−8.7
Turnout		3,115	32	
Liberal Democrats hold				
Liberal Democrats hold				
Liberal Democrats hold				

== Changes 2023–2027 ==
=== Affiliation changes ===
Sean Rhodes (Labour) defects to the Greens on 29 June 2026.

=== By-elections ===
==== New Cheltenham ====
New Cheltenham by-election, 2 May 2024
Party	Candidate	Votes	%	±%
Labour	Angela Morey	666	48.2	
Conservative	Kelly Cole	418	30.2	
Green	AJ Coakham	189	137	
Liberal Democrats	James Corrigan	109	7.9	
Majority		258	18.0	
Turnout		1 ,399	20.7	−6.3
Labour hold				

The New Cheltenham by-election was triggered by the resignation of Labour councillor Sandie Davis.

==== Frampton Cotterell ====
Frampton Cotterell by-election: 28 November 2024
Party	Candidate	Votes	%	±%
Liberal Democrats	David Goodwin	1,315	49.3	–2.4
Conservative	Tim Niblett	1,114	41.7	+8.1
Green	Alan Lankester	160	6.0	–3.0
Labour	Jonathan Trollope	80	3.0	–2.7
Majority		201	7.6	N/A
Turnout		2,677	25.5	–17.5
Registered electors		10,516		
Liberal Democrats hold		Swing	▼5.3	

==== Longwell Green ====
Longwell Green by-election: 23 July 2026
Party	Candidate	Votes	%	±%
Conservative	Graham Hardwell	951	37.3	−11.2
Reform	Stephen Burge	698	27.4	N/A
Liberal Democrats	Jim Corrigan	511	20.0	−10.5
Labour	Jack Friend	246	9.7	N/A
Green	Rachael Ward	143	5.6	N/A
Majority		253	9.9	N/A
Turnout		2,551	33.6	–0.2
Registered electors		7,587		
Conservative hold				

The Longwell Green by-election was triggered by the resignation of councillor Kristopher Murphy
