= Wansdyke (constituency) =

UK Parliament constituency (1983–2010)

Coordinates: 51°20′N 2°30′W

- Former county constituency for the House of Commons
- Boundary of Wansdyke in Avon for the 2005 general election

- Location of Avon within England
- County: Somerset

1983–2010
- Seats: One
- Created from: North Somerset and Kingswood
- Replaced by: North East Somerset

Wansdyke was a constituency (Note: A county constituency (for the purposes of election expenses and type of returning officer).) represented in the House of Commons of the UK Parliament. It elected one Member of Parliament (MP) by the first past the post system of election.

The constituency was created for the 1983 general election, and abolished at the 2010 general election.

== History ==
Until 1997, it was a safe seat for the Conservative Party. It then became a Labour-held marginal until its abolition.

== Boundaries ==
1983–1997: The District of Wansdyke wards of Bathampton, Batheaston, Bathford, Camerton, Charlcombe, Freshford, Hinton Charterhouse, Keynsham East, Keynsham North, Keynsham South, Keynsham West, Midsomer Norton North, Midsomer Norton Redfield, Newton St Loe, Peasedown St John, Radstock, Saltford, and Westfield, and the District of Kingswood wards of Badminton, Bitton North Common, Bitton Oldland Common, Bitton South, Blackhorse, Bromley Heath, Hanham Abbots East, Hanham Abbots West, Oldland Cadbury Heath, Oldland Longwell Green, Siston, and Springfield.

1997–2010: The District of Wansdyke wards of Cameley, Camerton, Chew Magna, Chew Stoke, Clutton, Compton Dando, Farmborough, Harptrees, High Littleton, Hinton Charterhouse, Keynsham East, Keynsham North, Keynsham South, Keynsham West, Midsomer Norton North, Midsomer Norton Redfield, Newton St Loe, Paulton, Peasedown St John, Publow, Radstock, Saltford, Stowey Sutton, Timsbury, and Westfield, and the Borough of Kingswood wards of Bitton North Common, Bitton Oldland Common, Bitton South, Hanham Abbots East, and Hanham Abbots West.

From 1997, Wansdyke covered the part of Bath and North East Somerset not in the Bath constituency. It also contained six wards or parts of wards from South Gloucestershire Council. It was named after the former Wansdyke district, itself named after the Wansdyke, a historical earthwork.

The constituency was located between the cities of Bristol and Bath, including the towns of Keynsham, Midsomer Norton, Radstock and Saltford, as well as the Chew Valley to the south of Bristol. It also covered parts of South Gloucestershire to the east of Bristol, including Bitton, Longwell Green and Oldland Common.

At the 2010 general election the seat was replaced with a new North East Somerset constituency. The parts in South Gloucestershire were transferred to the Kingswood constituency.

== Members of Parliament ==
Election	Party	Member
1983	Conservative	Jack Aspinwall
1997	Labour	Dan Norris
2010	Constituency abolished: see North East Somerset	

== Elections ==
=== Elections in the 2000s ===
General election 2005: Wansdyke
Party	Candidate	Votes	%	±%
Labour	Dan Norris	20,686	40.6	−6.2
Conservative	Chris Watt	18,847	37.0	+1.5
Liberal Democrats	Gail Coleshill	10,050	19.7	+5.3
UKIP	Peter Sandell	1,129	2.2	+0.9
Independent	Geoffrey Parkes	221	0.4	New
Majority		1,839	3.6	−7.7
Turnout		50,933	72.4	+2.5
Labour hold		Swing	−3.8	

General election 2001: Wansdyke
Party	Candidate	Votes	%	±%
Labour	Dan Norris	23,206	46.8	+2.7
Conservative	Chris Watt	17,593	35.5	+0.2
Liberal Democrats	Gail Coleshill	7,135	14.4	−2.4
Green	Francis Hayden	958	1.9	New
UKIP	Peter Sandell	655	1.3	+0.5
Majority		5,613	11.3	+2.5
Turnout		49,547	69.9	−9.4
Labour hold		Swing	+1.3	

=== Elections in the 1990s ===
General election 1997: Wansdyke
Party	Candidate	Votes	%	±%
Labour	Dan Norris	24,117	44.1	+16.4
Conservative	Mark Prisk	19,318	35.3	−12.9
Liberal Democrats	Jeff Manning	9,205	16.8	−6.0
Referendum	Kevin Clinton	1,327	2.4	New
UKIP	T.S. Hunt	438	0.8	New
Monster Raving Loony	Peter House	225	0.4	New
Natural Law	Sue Lincoln	92	0.2	New
Majority		4,799	8.8	N/A
Turnout		54,722	79.3	0.0
Labour gain from Conservative		Swing	-14.65	

General election 1992: Wansdyke
Party	Candidate	Votes	%	±%
Conservative	Jack Aspinwall	31,389	48.2	−3.4
Labour	Dan Norris	18,048	27.7	+4.4
Liberal Democrats	D Darby	14,834	22.8	−2.4
Green	FE Hayden	800	1.2	New
Majority		13,341	20.5	−5.9
Turnout		65,071	84.2	+2.9
Conservative hold		Swing	−3.9	

=== Elections in the 1980s ===
General election 1987: Wansdyke
Party	Candidate	Votes	%	±%
Conservative	Jack Aspinwall	31,537	51.56	
Liberal	Roger Blackmore	15,393	25.17	
Labour	Ian White	14,231	23.27	
Majority		16,144	26.39	
Turnout		61,161	81.29	
Conservative hold		Swing		

General election 1983: Wansdyke
Party	Candidate	Votes	%	±%
Conservative	Jack Aspinwall	28,434	50.61	
Liberal	Richard Denton-White	15,368	27.35	
Labour	Lynn Williams	12,168	21.66	
Wessex Regionalist	A Stout	213	0.38	
Majority		13,066	23.26	
Turnout		56,183	79.03	
Conservative hold		Swing		

== See also ==
- Parliamentary constituencies in Avon
