= Louise Harris (politician) =

Cllr Louise Harris
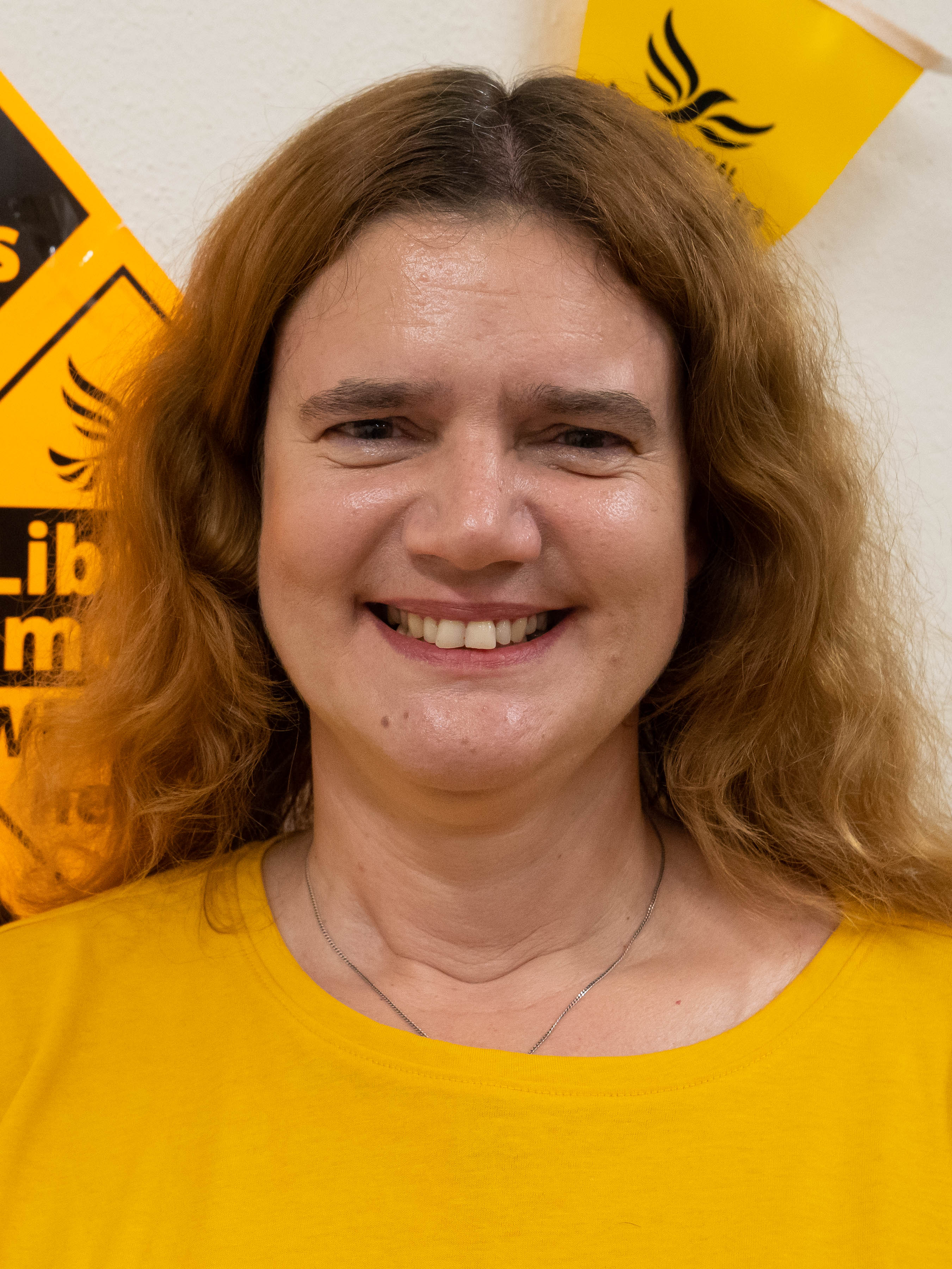

Councillor on South Gloucestershire Council for Dodington
- Incumbent
- Assumed office 1 November 2018 Serving with Tony Davis
- Preceded by: Gloria Stephen

Councillor on Eastleigh Borough Council for Hedge End Grange Park
- In office 1 May 2002 – 2 June 2017
- Succeeded by: George Morris

Member of the London Assembly as an additional member
- In office 1 May 2000 – 18 February 2002
- Preceded by: Assembly created
- Succeeded by: Mike Tuffrey

Personal details
- Born: Louise Anne Bloom; 7 April 1964 (age 62)
- Party: Liberal Democrats

Louise Anne Harris (born 7 April 1964) is a Liberal Democrat politician who has served as a councillor on South Gloucestershire Council for Dodington since November 2018. As Louise Bloom, she was a member of the first London Assembly between 2000 and 2002, and councillor on Eastleigh Borough Council between 2002 and 2017.

== Political career ==
She was an active member of the National League of Young Liberals as part of what was known as the Green Guard.

Louise Harris was elected as the 5th additional member of the first London Assembly in May 2000. She resigned her seat for family reasons on 18 February 2002 and was replaced by Mike Tuffrey.

Bloom was a councillor on Eastleigh Borough Council for Hedge End Grange Park from May 2002 until June 2017, and the cabinet member for Environment and Sustainability until May 2015.

In a November 2018 by-election, Harris was elected as a Liberal Democrat councillor for the Dodington ward of South Gloucestershire Council and stood as a candidate in the 2019 General Election in Filton and Bradley Stoke. She was again elected in the 2019 and 2023 elections.

In February 2023, she was elected as the honorary president of the English Young Liberals at the Young Liberal Winter Conference in Reading.

In the 2024 United Kingdom general election, she was a candidate in Bristol North East.

== Bibliography ==
- Who's Who 2008 (A. & C. Black 2007)
