= Claire Young =

British MP (born 1974)

Claire Young MP
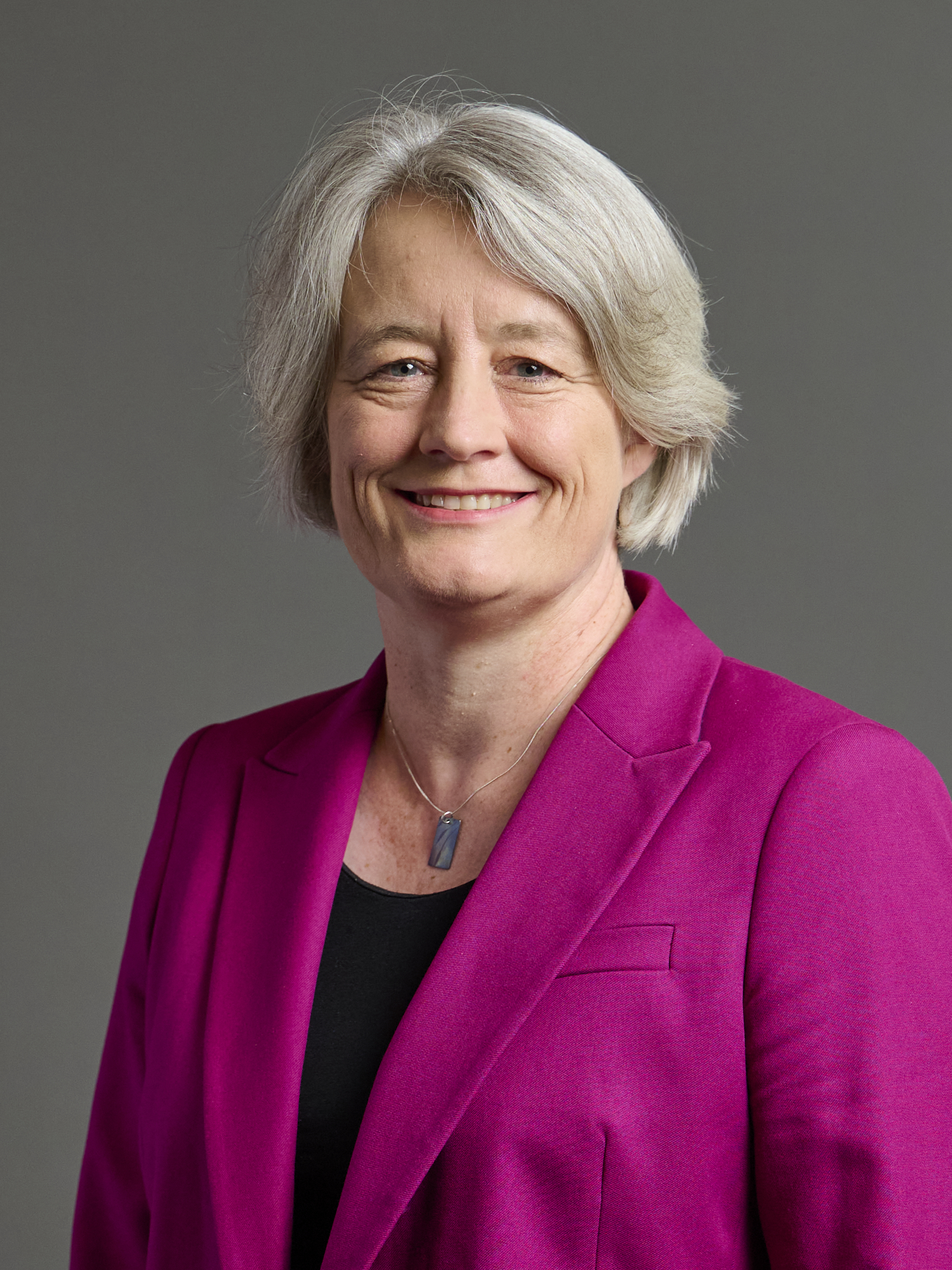
- Official portrait, 2024

Member of Parliament for Thornbury and Yate
- Incumbent
- Assumed office 4 July 2024
- Preceded by: Luke Hall
- Majority: 3,014 (5.6%)

Leader of South Gloucestershire Council
- In office 24 May 2023 – 18 July 2024
- Preceded by: Toby Savage
- Succeeded by: Maggie Tyrrell

Member of South Gloucestershire Council for Frampton Cotterell
- In office 2 May 2019 – 17 October 2024

Member of South Gloucestershire Council for Westerleigh
- In office 3 May 2007 – 2 May 2019
- Succeeded by: Division abolished

Personal details
- Born: Claire Louise Young; 16 March 1974 (age 52)
- Party: Liberal Democrats
- Education: Trinity College, Cambridge; University of Oxford; University of Bristol

Claire Louise Young is a Liberal Democrat politician who has been the Member of Parliament for Thornbury and Yate since 2024. Before the election, she was also the Leader of South Gloucestershire Council.

== Early life and education ==
Young graduated with a BA (converted to an MA) in Mathematics from Trinity College, Cambridge, in 1995 and a Master of Science in Software Engineering from the University of Oxford in 1999. She later completed a Masters by Research in Global Environmental Challenges at the University of Bristol in 2024. After graduating from Cambridge Young spent a decade working in the software industry. She began her career with IBM, where her work included stints in Silicon Valley, and later worked for high-tech start-up businesses in the UK.

== Political career ==
Young has been a Councillor on South Gloucestershire Council since 2007, first being elected to represent Westerleigh. During this time she has campaigned with other parents to end the under-funding of local schools, which are amongst the lowest funded in the country. She also fought for better support for children with special needs and disabilities, chairing a Council review of this area of provision.

Young first stood for the Parliamentary constituency of Thornbury and Yate at the 2017 general election, where she came second. She stood again at the 2019 general election, again coming second.

At the 2023 South Gloucestershire Council election, Young was re-elected as a Councillor for Frampton Cotterell ward with an increased share of the vote. The results saw the ruling Conservative administration lose 10 seats, losing control of the administration for the first time since 2015. After a period of negotiations, Young became Leader of the Council following an agreement which saw the Liberal Democrats and Labour agree to form a joint administration.

At the 2024 general election, she contested the Thornbury and Yate seat for a third time – defeating Conservative incumbent Luke Hall by 3,014 votes.

Shortly after the result was declared, Young announced that she would be standing down as Leader of South Gloucestershire Council, telling the BBC "I'm going to stand down because I think it's important that Leader of council in itself is a full time role. I think it's important to do to do one job well".

== Parliamentary career ==
Young was sworn in as an MP on 10 July. She made her maiden speech on 29 July during a debate on the future of British railways. In her speech, she called for the Government to improve South Gloucestershire's railway links by investing in greater flood prevention, support the redevelopment of Yate station, and reopen the stations at Pilning, Coalpit Heath and Thornbury.

== Personal life ==
Young currently lives in Yate, having previously raised her two children in Coalpit Heath. In her spare time she is a keen walker and amateur photographer.

In November 2024, Young announced that she has begun to experience hearing loss, and requires the use of hearing aids.
