= South Gloucestershire Council =

Unitary authority in Gloucestershire, England

Type
- Type: Unitary authority

History
- Founded: 1 April 1996

Leadership
- Chair: Adrian Rush, Liberal Democrat since 20 May 2026
- Leader: Maggie Tyrrell, Liberal Democrat since 17 July 2024
- Chief Executive: Dave Perry since 12 December 2018

Structure
- Seats: 61 councillors
- Graph of the party split among 61 seats.
- Political groups: Administration (32) Liberal Democrats (18) Labour (14) Other parties (29) Conservative (23) Green (1) Independent (5)

Elections
- Voting system: First past the post
- Last election: 4 May 2023
- Next election: 6 May 2027

Meeting place
- Civic Centre, High Street, Kingswood, BS15 9TR

Website
- www.southglos.gov.uk

South Gloucestershire Council is the local authority of South Gloucestershire, a local government district in the ceremonial county of Gloucestershire, England, covering an area to the north of the city of Bristol. The council is a unitary authority, being a district council which also performs the functions of a county council; it is independent from Gloucestershire County Council. Since 2017 the council has been a member of the West of England Combined Authority.

The council has been under no overall control since 2023, being run by a Liberal Democrat and Labour coalition. It meets at the Civic Centre in Kingswood and also has offices in Yate.

== History ==
The district of South Gloucestershire and its council were created in 1996. The new district covered the area of two former districts, both of which were abolished at the same time: Kingswood and Northavon. Both had been lower-tier districts within the county of Avon prior to the 1996 reforms, with Avon County Council providing county-level services to the area.

The districts of Kingswood and Northavon and the county of Avon had been created in 1974 under the Local Government Act 1972, and so were only in existence for 22 years. The area that would become South Gloucestershire was transferred from Gloucestershire to the new non-metropolitan county of Avon in 1974. Avon was abolished in 1996 and four unitary authorities established to govern the former county. The way the 1996 change was implemented was to create both a non-metropolitan district and non-metropolitan county called South Gloucestershire, covering the combined area of Kingswood and Northavon, but with no separate county council. Instead, the district council also performs the functions that legislation assigns to county councils, making it a unitary authority. At the same time, the new district was transferred for ceremonial purposes back to Gloucestershire, but as a unitary authority the council has always been independent from Gloucestershire County Council.

== Governance ==
South Gloucestershire Council provides both district-level and county-level functions. Some strategic functions in the area are provided by the West of England Combined Authority; the co-leader of the council sits on the combined authority as South Gloucestershire's representative. The whole district is covered by civil parishes, which form the first tier of local government.

=== Political control ===
The council has been under no overall control since 2023, being led by a Liberal Democrat and Labour coalition.

The first election to the council was held in 1995, initially operating as a shadow authority alongside the outgoing authorities until 1 April 1996 when the new district and its council formally came into being. Political control of the council since 1996 has been as follows:

Party in control	Years
No overall control	1996–1999
Liberal Democrats	1999–2003
No overall control	2003–2015
Conservative	2015–2023
No overall control	2023–present

=== Leadership ===
Since 2024, the council has been led by Maggie Tyrrell of the Liberal Democrats, with co-leader Ian Boulton of Labour serving as her deputy.

The leaders of the council since 1999 have been:

Councillor	Party	From	To
Neil Halsall	Liberal Democrats	1999	13 Jul 2005
Ruth Davis	Liberal Democrats	13 Jul 2005	May 2007
John Calway	Conservative	6 Jun 2007	Aug 2014
Matthew Riddle	Conservative	1 Sep 2014	16 May 2018
Toby Savage	Conservative	16 May 2018	May 2023
Claire Young	Liberal Democrats	24 May 2023	17 Jul 2024
Maggie Tyrrell	Liberal Democrats	17 Jul 2024	

=== Composition ===
Following the 2023 election, and subsequent by-elections and changes of allegiance up to July 2026, the composition of the council was:

Party	Seats
Conservative	23
Liberal Democrats	18
Labour	14
Green	1
Independent	5
Total	61

The next election is due in May 2027.

== Elections ==
Since the last boundary changes in 2019, the council has comprised 61 councillors representing 28 wards, with each ward electing one, two or three councillors. Elections are held every four years.

== Premises ==
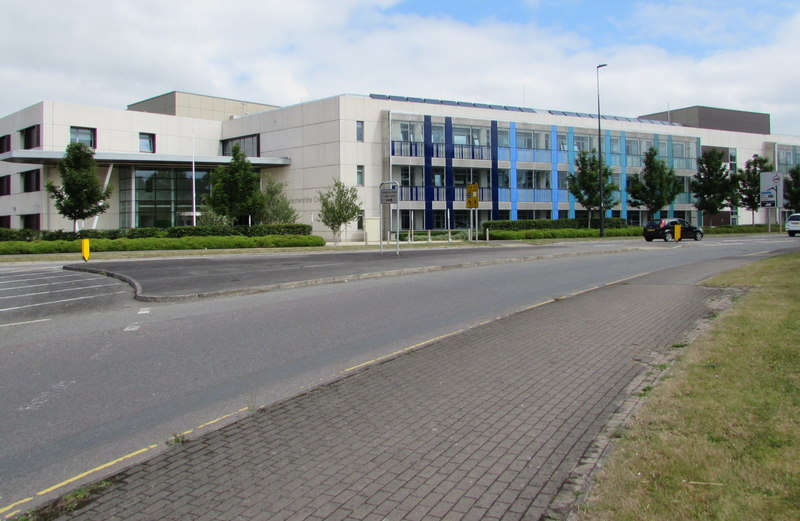
Council Offices, Badminton Road, Yate

The council generally holds its meetings in the council chamber at the Civic Centre on High Street, Kingswood. When the council was created in 1996 it inherited the Kingswood Civic Centre from Kingswood Borough Council and offices at Castle Street in Thornbury from Northavon District Council. In 2010 the council opened a new office on Badminton Road in Yate, which houses many of the council's administrative functions. The Thornbury building was subsequently closed and redeveloped. In addition to the two main buildings at Kingswood and Yate, the council also has a number of smaller offices and one-stop shops in Yate and Patchway.

== Chair ==
The chair of the council is chosen from among the councillors and is usually held by a different councillor each year. They are expected to maintain a politically neutral stance, although they do get an additional casting vote in the event of a tied vote. The chairs have been:

- 1995–1996: Eddie Gadsby
- 1996–1997: Les Bishop
- 1997–1998: Sue Hope
- 1998–1999: Rudi Springer
- 1999–2001: Arthur Adams
- 2001–2002: Alan Bracey
- 2002–2003: Jeanette Ward
- 2003–2004: Sue Walker
- 2004–2005: June Lovell
- 2005–2006: Alan Lawrance
- 2006–2007: Jim Cullimore
- 2007–2008: Sandra O'Neil
- 2008–2009: Brian Freeguard
- 2009–2010: Shirley Holloway
- 2010–2011: Janet Biggin
- 2011–2012: Mike Drew
- 2012–2013: Janet Biggin
- 2013–2014: Ian Boulton
- 2014–2015: Howard Gawler
- 2015–2016: Erica Williams
- 2016–2017: Erica Williams
- 2017–2018: Ian Blair
- 2018–2019: Rachael Hunt
- 2019–2020: Brian Allinson
- 2020–2021: June Bamford
- 2021–2022: Ruth Davis
- 2022–2023: Sanjay Shambhu
- 2023–2024: Mike Drew
- 2024–2025: Franklin Owusu-Antwi MBE
- 2025–2026: Katie Cooper
