= Parliamentary constituencies in South West England =

The region of South West England is divided into 58 parliamentary constituencies, which are made up of 16 borough constituencies and 42 county constituencies. Since the general election of July 2024, 24 are represented by Labour MPs, 22 by Liberal Democrat MPs, 10 by Conservative MPs, 1 by a Green MP, and 1 by a Reform UK MP.

== Constituencies ==
† Conservative ‡ Labour ¤ Liberal Democrat ♣ Green Party # Reform UK

Constituency (Note: BC denotes borough constituency, CC denotes county constituency.)	Electorate	Majority (Note: The majority is the number of votes the winning candidate receives more than their nearest rival.)	Member of Parliament	Nearest opposition	County	Map
Bath CC	69,655	11,218	Wera Hobhouse ¤	Dan Bewley ‡	Somerset (prev. Avon)	
Bournemouth East BC	72,354	5,479	Tom Hayes ‡	Tobias Ellwood †	Dorset	
Bournemouth West BC	70,259	3,224	Jessica Toale ‡	Conor Burns †	Dorset	
Bridgwater CC	71,571	1,349	Ashley Fox †	Leigh Redman ‡	Somerset	
Bristol Central BC	62,735	10,407	Carla Denyer ♣	Thangam Debbonaire ‡	Bristol (prev. Avon)	
Bristol East BC	75,917	6,606	Kerry McCarthy ‡	Ani Stafford-Townsend ♣	Bristol (prev. Avon)	
Bristol North East BC	70,076	11,167	Damien Egan ‡	Lorraine Francis ♣	Bristol / Gloucestershire (prev. Avon)	
Bristol North West BC	74,869	15,669	Darren Jones ‡	Mary Page ♣	Bristol (prev. Avon)	
Bristol South BC	75,533	7,666	Karin Smyth ‡	Jai Breitnauer ♣	Bristol (prev. Avon)	
Camborne and Redruth CC	74,402	7,806	Perran Moon ‡	Connor Donnithorne †	Cornwall	
Central Devon CC	75,385	61	Mel Stride †	Ollie Pearson ‡	Devon	
Cheltenham BC	76,143	7,210	Max Wilkinson ¤	Alex Chalk †	Gloucestershire	
Chippenham CC	72,492	8,138	Sarah Gibson ¤	Nic Puntis †	Wiltshire	
Christchurch CC	71,064	7,455	Christopher Chope †	Mike Cox ¤	Dorset	
East Wiltshire CC	72,409	4,716	Danny Kruger # (Re-elected as a Conservative)	Rob Newman ‡	Wiltshire	
Exeter BC	67,840	11,937	Steve Race ‡	Tessa Tucker †	Devon	
Exmouth and Exeter East CC	79,983	121	David Reed †	Helen Dallimore ‡	Devon	
Filton and Bradley Stoke CC	77,584	10,000	Claire Hazelgrove ‡	Jack Lopresti †	Gloucestershire (prev. Avon)	
Forest of Dean CC	72,052	278	Matt Bishop ‡	Mark Harper †	Gloucestershire	
Frome and East Somerset CC	70,378	5,415	Anna Sabine ¤	Lucy Trimnell †	Somerset / Somerset (prev. Avon)	
Glastonbury and Somerton CC	72,982	6,611	Sarah Dyke ¤	Faye Purbrick †	Somerset	
Gloucester BC	79,479	3,431	Alex McIntyre ‡	Richard Graham †	Gloucestershire	
Honiton and Sidmouth CC	75,537	6,700	Richard Foord ¤	Simon Jupp †	Devon	
Melksham and Devizes CC	71,999	2,401	Brian Mathew ¤	Michelle Donelan †	Wiltshire	
Mid Dorset and North Poole CC	72,509	1,352	Vikki Slade ¤	Michael Tomlinson †	Dorset	
Newton Abbot CC	73,885	2,246	Martin Wrigley ¤	Anne Marie Morris †	Devon	
North Cornwall CC	76,741	10,767	Ben Maguire ¤	Scott Mann †	Cornwall	
North Cotswolds CC	72,513	3,357	Geoffrey Clifton-Brown †	Paul Hodgkinson ¤	Gloucestershire	
North Devon CC	79,068	6,744	Ian Roome ¤	Selaine Saxby †	Devon	
North Dorset CC	72,690	1,589	Simon Hoare †	Gary Jackson ¤	Dorset	
North East Somerset and Hanham CC	73,887	5,319	Dan Norris ‡	Jacob Rees-Mogg †	Gloucestershire / Somerset (prev. Avon)	
North Somerset CC	74,426	639	Sadik Al-Hassan ‡	Liam Fox †	Somerset (prev. Avon)	
Plymouth Moor View BC	74,724	5,604	Fred Thomas ‡	Johnny Mercer †	Devon	
Plymouth Sutton and Devonport BC	75,313	13,328	Luke Pollard ‡	Peter Gold #	Devon	
Poole BC	72,509	18	Neil Duncan-Jordan ‡	Robert Syms †	Dorset	
Salisbury CC	70,281	3,807	John Glen †	Matt Aldridge ‡	Wiltshire	
South Cotswolds CC	71,490	4,973	Roz Savage ¤	James Gray †	Gloucestershire / Wiltshire	
South Devon CC	70,755	7,127	Caroline Voaden ¤	Anthony Mangnall †	Devon	
South Dorset CC	75,924	1,048	Lloyd Hatton ‡	Richard Drax †	Dorset	
South East Cornwall CC	72,728	1,911	Anna Gelderd ‡	Sheryll Murray †	Cornwall	
South West Devon CC	77,600	2,112	Rebecca Smith †	Sarah Allen ‡	Devon	
South West Wiltshire CC	71,574	3,243	Andrew Murrison †	Evelyn Akoto ‡	Wiltshire	
St Austell and Newquay CC	76,140	2,470	Noah Law ‡	Steve Double †	Cornwall	
St Ives CC	69,980	13,786	Andrew George ¤	Derek Thomas †	Cornwall	
Stroud CC	77,912	11,411	Simon Opher ‡	Siobhan Baillie †	Gloucestershire	
Swindon North CC	73,238	4,103	Will Stone ‡	Justin Tomlinson †	Wiltshire	
Swindon South BC	72,596	9,606	Heidi Alexander ‡	Robert Buckland †	Wiltshire	
Taunton and Wellington CC	78,116	11,939	Gideon Amos ¤	Rebecca Pow †	Somerset	
Tewkesbury CC	73,458	6,262	Cameron Thomas ¤	Laurence Robertson †	Gloucestershire	
Thornbury and Yate CC	78,195	3,014	Claire Young ¤	Luke Hall †	Gloucestershire (prev. Avon)	
Tiverton and Minehead CC	71,843	3,507	Rachel Gilmour ¤	Ian Liddell-Grainger †	Devon / Somerset	
Torbay BC	76,179	5,349	Steve Darling ¤	Kevin Foster †	Devon	
Torridge and Tavistock CC	74,727	3,950	Geoffrey Cox †	Phil Hutty ¤	Devon	
Truro and Falmouth CC	72,982	8,151	Jayne Kirkham ‡	Cherilyn Mackrory †	Cornwall	
Wells and Mendip Hills CC	72,051	11,121	Tessa Munt ¤	Meg Powell-Chandler †	Somerset / Somerset (prev. Avon)	
West Dorset CC	75,998	7,789	Edward Morello ¤	Chris Loder †	Dorset	
Weston-super-Mare CC	71,396	4,409	Dan Aldridge ‡	John Penrose †	Somerset (prev. Avon)	
Yeovil CC	79,700	12,286	Adam Dance ¤	Marcus Fysh †	Somerset	

== 2023 boundary changes ==
See 2023 Periodic Review of Westminster constituencies for further details.

Following the abandonment of the Sixth Periodic Review (the 2018 review), the Boundary Commission for England formally launched the 2023 Review on 5 January 2021. The Commission calculated that the number of seats to be allocated to the South West region would be increased by 3, from 55 to 58. Initial proposals were published on 8 June 2021 and, following two periods of public consultation, revised proposals were published on 8 November 2022. The final proposals were published on 28 June 2023.

Under the proposals, the following constituencies for the region came into effect at the 2024 general election:

Constituency	Electorate	Ceremonial county	Local authority
Bath CC	73,241	Somerset	Bath and North East Somerset
Bournemouth East BC	73,173	Dorset	Bournemouth, Christchurch and Poole
Bournemouth West BC	72,094	Dorset	Bournemouth, Christchurch and Poole
Bridgwater CC	71,418	Somerset	Somerset
Bristol Central BC	70,227	Bristol	Bristol
Bristol East BC	75,936	Bristol	Bristol
Bristol North East BC	69,793	Bristol / Gloucestershire	Bristol / South Gloucestershire
Bristol North West BC	76,783	Bristol	Bristol
Bristol South BC	74,696	Bristol	Bristol
Camborne and Redruth CC	73,568	Cornwall	Cornwall
Central Devon CC	73,491	Devon	Mid Devon / Teignbridge / West Devon
Cheltenham BC	75,292	Gloucestershire	Cheltenham
Chippenham CC	71,648	Wiltshire	Wiltshire
Christchurch CC	71,598	Dorset	Bournemouth, Christchurch and Poole / Dorset
East Wiltshire CC	71,109	Wiltshire	Swindon / Wiltshire
Exeter BC	71,713	Devon	Exeter
Exmouth and Exeter East CC	74,502	Devon	East Devon / Exeter
Filton and Bradley Stoke CC	73,598	Gloucestershire	South Gloucestershire
Forest of Dean CC	71,510	Gloucestershire	Forest of Dean / Tewkesbury
Frome and East Somerset CC	70,177	Somerset	Bath and North East Somerset / Somerset
Glastonbury and Somerton CC	70,015	Somerset	Somerset
Gloucester BC	76,695	Gloucestershire	Gloucester
Honiton and Sidmouth CC	74,365	Devon	East Devon / Mid Devon
Melksham and Devizes CC	71,823	Wiltshire	Wiltshire
Mid Dorset and North Poole CC	74,305	Dorset	Bournemouth, Christchurch and Poole / Dorset
Newton Abbot CC	72,956	Devon	Teignbridge
North Cornwall CC	75,034	Cornwall	Cornwall
North Cotswolds CC	70,915	Gloucestershire	Cotswold / Stroud / Tewkesbury
North Devon CC	76,455	Devon	North Devon
North Dorset CC	72,109	Dorset	Dorset
North East Somerset and Hanham CC	73,113	Gloucestershire / Somerset	Bath and North East Somerset / South Gloucestershire
North Somerset CC	73,963	Somerset	North Somerset
Plymouth Moor View BC	73,378	Devon	Plymouth
Plymouth Sutton and Devonport BC	73,495	Devon	Plymouth
Poole BC	72,162	Dorset	Bournemouth, Christchurch and Poole
Salisbury CC	70,242	Wiltshire	Wiltshire
South Cotswolds CC	72,865	Gloucestershire / Wiltshire	Cotswold / Stroud / Wiltshire
South Devon CC	71,691	Devon	South Hams / Torbay
South Dorset CC	76,640	Dorset	Dorset
South East Cornwall CC	71,734	Cornwall	Cornwall
South West Devon CC	75,371	Devon	Plymouth / South Hams / West Devon
South West Wiltshire CC	71,551	Wiltshire	Wiltshire
St Austell and Newquay CC	74,585	Cornwall	Cornwall
St Ives CC	70,107	Cornwall	Cornwall / Isles of Scilly
Stroud CC	76,249	Gloucestershire	Stroud
Swindon North CC	72,163	Wiltshire	Swindon
Swindon South BC	72,468	Wiltshire	Swindon
Taunton and Wellington CC	76,049	Somerset	Somerset
Tewkesbury CC	72,426	Gloucestershire	Cheltenham / Gloucester / Tewkesbury
Thornbury and Yate CC	74,985	Gloucestershire	South Gloucestershire
Tiverton and Minehead CC	70,829	Devon / Somerset	Mid Devon / Somerset
Torbay BC	75,742	Devon	Torbay
Torridge and Tavistock CC	74,802	Devon	Torridge / West Devon
Truro and Falmouth CC	73,326	Cornwall	Cornwall
Wells and Mendip Hills CC	69,843	Somerset	North Somerset / Somerset
West Dorset CC	75,390	Dorset	Dorset
Weston-super-Mare CC	70,722	Somerset	North Somerset
Yeovil CC	76,056	Somerset	Somerset

== 2024 results ==
The number of votes cast for each political party who fielded candidates in constituencies comprising the South West region in the 2024 general election were as follows:

Party	Votes	%	Change from 2019	Seats	Change from 2019 (actual)	Change from 2019 (notional)
Conservative	785,672	28.2	▼24.6	11	▼37	▼39
Liberal Democrats	686,921	24.7	▲6.5	22	▲21	▲21
Labour	682,080	24.5	▲1.1	24	▲18	▲17
Reform UK	384,240	13.8	▲13.4	0	0	0
Green	206,780	7.4	▲3.7	1	▲1	▲1
Others	39,737	1.4	▼0.1	0	0	0
Total	2,785,430	100.0		58	▲3	

== Results history ==
Primary data source: House of Commons research briefing - General election results from 1918 to 2019 (2024 as above)

=== Percentage votes ===
South West votes %

Key:

- CON - Conservative Party, including National Liberal Party up to 1966
- LAB - Labour Party, including Labour and Co-operative Party
- LIB - Liberal Party up to 1979; SDP-Liberal Alliance 1983 & 1987; Liberal Democrats from 1992
- UKIP - UK Independence Party 2010 to 2017 (included in Other up to 2005 and from 2019)
- REF - Reform UK (2019 - Brexit Party)
- GRN - Green Party of England and Wales (included in Other up to 2005)

=== Seats ===
South West seats won

Key:

- CON - Conservative Party, including National Liberal Party up to 1966
- LAB - Labour Party, including Labour and Co-operative Party
- LIB - Liberal Party up to 1979; SDP-Liberal Alliance 1983 & 1987; Liberal Democrats from 1992
- GRN - Green Party of England and Wales
- OTH - 1945 - (1) Independent Progressive (Vernon Bartlett); (2) Independent National (Daniel Lipson)

== Former constituencies ==
=== Abolished in 2024 ===
- Bridgwater and West Somerset → Bridgwater
- Bristol West → Bristol Central
- Devizes → East Wiltshire
- East Devon → Exmouth and Exeter East
- Kingswood → Bristol North East
- North East Somerset → North East Somerset and Hanham
- North Wiltshire → South Cotswolds
- Somerton and Frome → Glastonbury and Somerton
- Taunton Deane → Taunton and Wellington
- The Cotswolds → South Cotswolds
- Tiverton and Honiton → Honiton and Sidmouth
- Torridge and West Devon → Torridge and Tavistock
- Totnes → South Devon
- Wells → Wells and Mendip Hills

=== Abolished in 2010 ===
- Bridgwater → Bridgwater and West Somerset
- Falmouth and Camborne → Camborne and Redruth, Truro and Falmouth
- Northavon → Thornbury and Yate, Filton and Bradley Stoke
- Plymouth Devonport → Plymouth Sutton and Devonport, Plymouth Moor View
- Plymouth Sutton → Plymouth Sutton and Devonport, Plymouth Moor View
- Taunton → Taunton Deane
- Teignbridge → Newton Abbot, Central Devon
- Truro and St Austell → Truro and Falmouth, St Austell and Newquay
- Wansdyke → North East Somerset
- Westbury → South West Wiltshire, Chippenham
- Woodspring → North Somerset

=== Abolished in 1997 ===
- Cirencester and Tewkesbury → Cotswold, Tewkesbury
- Plymouth Drake → Plymouth Sutton
- Swindon → North Swindon, South Swindon
- West Gloucestershire → Forest of Dean, Tewkesbury

== See also ==
- List of United Kingdom Parliament constituencies
- List of parliamentary constituencies in Avon
- List of parliamentary constituencies in Cornwall
- List of parliamentary constituencies in Devon
- List of parliamentary constituencies in Dorset
- List of parliamentary constituencies in Gloucestershire
- List of parliamentary constituencies in Somerset
- List of parliamentary constituencies in Wiltshire
