= Parliamentary constituencies in Avon =

Avon was abolished in 1996 both as a county council and a ceremonial county, being succeeded by the unitary authorities of Bath and North East Somerset, Bristol, North Somerset, and South Gloucestershire. The constituency boundaries used up to the 2005 United Kingdom general election were drawn up when the county still existed. For the review which came into effect for the 2010 general election, the four authorities were considered separately, entailing four seats for Bristol, three for South Gloucestershire and two each for Bath and North East Somerset and North Somerset.

For the 2023 Periodic Review of Westminster constituencies, coming into effect for the 2024 United Kingdom general election, the Boundary Commission for England considered the area comprising the former county of Avon, together with Devon (including Plymouth and Torbay) and Somerset as a sub-region of the South West Region.

The area is divided into 13 parliamentary constituencies – 6 borough constituencies and 7 county constituencies, including two which cross local authority boundaries with Somerset.

== Constituencies ==
† Conservative ‡ Labour ¤ Liberal Democrat ♣ Green

Constituency (Note: BC denotes borough constituency, CC denotes county constituency.)	Electorate	Majority	Member of Parliament	Nearest opposition	Electoral wards	Map
Bath CC	73,241	11,218	Wera Hobhouse¤	Dan Bewley‡	Bath and North East Somerset Council: Bathavon North, Bathwick, Combe Down, Kingsmead, Lambridge, Lansdown, Moorlands, Newbridge, Odd Down, Oldfield Park, Southdown, Twerton, Walcot, Westmoreland, Weston, Widcombe & Lyncombe.	Map showing the location of the Bath constituency in Avon under the boundaries created by the 2023 boundary review and first used at the 2024 general election.
Bristol Central BC	70,227	10,407	Carla Denyer♣	Thangam Debbonaire‡	Bristol City Council: Ashley, Central, Clifton, Clifton Down, Cotham, Hotwells & Harbourside, Redland.	Map showing the location of the Bristol Central constituency in Avon under the boundaries created by the 2023 boundary review and first used at the 2024 general election.
Bristol East BC	75,936	6,606	Kerry McCarthy‡	Ani Stafford-Townsend♣	Bristol City Council: Brislington East, Brislington West, Easton, Knowle, Lawrence Hill, St. George Central, St. George Troopers Hill, St. George West, Stockwood.	Map showing the location of the Bristol East constituency in Avon under the boundaries created by the 2023 boundary review and first used at the 2024 general election.
Bristol North East BC	69,793	11,167	Damien Egan‡	Lorraine Francis♣	Bristol City Council: Eastville, Frome Vale, Hillfields, Lockleaze. South Gloucestershire Council: Kingswood, New Cheltenham, Staple Hill & Mangotsfield, Woodstock.	Map showing the location of the Bristol North East constituency in Avon under the boundaries created by the 2023 boundary review and first used at the 2024 general election.
Bristol North West BC	76,783	15,669	Darren Jones‡	Mary Page♣	Bristol City Council: Avonmouth & Lawrence Weston, Bishopston & Ashley Down, Henbury & Brentry, Horfield, Southmead, Stoke Bishop, Westbury-on-Trym & Henleaze.	Map showing the location of the Bristol North East constituency in Avon under the boundaries created by the 2023 boundary review and first used at the 2024 general election.
Bristol South BC	74,696	7,666	Karin Smyth‡	Jai Breitnauer♣	Bristol City Council: Bedminster, Bishopsworth, Filwood, Hartcliffe & Withywood, Hengrove & Whitchurch Park, Southville, Windmill Hill.	Map showing the location of the Bristol South constituency in Avon under the boundaries created by the 2023 boundary review and first used at the 2024 general election.
Filton and Bradley Stoke BC	73,598	10,000	Claire Hazelgrove‡	Jack Lopresti†	South Gloucestershire Council: Bradley Stoke North, Bradley Stoke South, Charlton & Cribbs, Emersons Green, Filton, Frenchay & Downend, Patchway Coniston, Stoke Gifford, Stoke Park & Cheswick, Winterbourne.	Map showing the location of the Filton and Bradley Stoke constituency in Avon under the boundaries created by the 2023 boundary review and first used at the 2024 general election.
Frome and East Somerset CC (part)	70,177	5,415	Anna Sabine¤	Lucy Trimnell†	Bath and North East Somerset Council: Bathavon South, Midsomer Norton North, Midsomer Norton Redfield, Peasedown, Radstock, Westfield. Mendip District Council: Ammerdown, Ashwick, Chilcompton and Stratton, Beckington and Selwood, Coleford and Holcombe, Cranmore, Doulting and Nunney, Creech, Frome Berkley Down, Frome College, Frome Keyford, Frome Market, Frome Oakfield, Frome Park, Postlebury, Rode and Norton St. Philip, The Pennards and Ditcheat.	Map showing the location of the Frome and East Somerset constituency in Avon under the boundaries created by the 2023 boundary review and first used at the 2024 general election.
North East Somerset and Hanham CC	73,113	5,319	Dan Norris‡	Jacob Rees-Mogg†	Bath and North East Somerset Council: Chew Valley, Clutton & Farmborough, High Littleton, Keynsham East, Keynsham North, Keynsham South, Mendip, Paulton, Publow & Whitchurch, Saltford, Timsbury. South Gloucestershire Council: Bitton & Oldland Common, Hanham, Longwell Green, Parkwall & Warmley.	Map showing the location of the North East Somerset and Hanham constituency in Avon under the boundaries created by the 2023 boundary review and first used at the 2024 general election.
North Somerset CC	73,963	639	Sadik Al-Hassan‡	Liam Fox†	North Somerset Council: Backwell, Clevedon East, Clevedon South, Clevedon Walton, Clevedon West, Clevedon Yeo, Gordano Valley, Long Ashton, Nailsea Golden Valley, Nailsea West End, Nailsea Yeo, Nailsea Youngwood, Pill, Portishead East, Portishead North, Portishead South, Portishead West, Winford, Wrington.	Map showing the location of the North Somerset constituency in Avon under the boundaries created by the 2023 boundary review and first used at the 2024 general election.
Thornbury and Yate CC	74,935	3,014	Claire Young¤	Luke Hall†	South Gloucestershire Council: Boyd Valley, Charfield, Chipping Sodbury & Cotswold Edge, Dodington, Frampton Cotterell, Pilning & Severn Beach, Severn Vale, Thornbury, Yate Central, Yate North.	Map showing the location of the Thornbury and Yate constituency in Avon under the boundaries created by the 2023 boundary review and first used at the 2024 general election.
Wells and Mendip Hills CC (part)	69,843	11,121	Tessa Munt¤	Meg Powell-Chandler†	Mendip District Council: Chewton Mendip and Ston Easton, Croscombe and Pilton, Moor, Rodney and Westbury, Shepton East, Shepton West, St. Cuthbert Out North, Wells Central, Wells St. Cuthbert's, Wells St. Thomas', Wookey and St. Cuthbert Out West. North Somerset Council: Banwell & Winscombe, Blagdon & Churchill, Congresbury & Puxton, Yatton. Sedgemoor District Council: Axevale, Cheddar and Shipham, East Polden, Knoll, Wedmore and Mark, West Polden.	Map showing the location of the Wells and Mendip Hills constituency in Avon under the boundaries created by the 2023 boundary review and first used at the 2024 general election.
Weston-super-Mare CC	70,722	4,409	Dan Aldridge‡	John Penrose†	North Somerset Council: Hutton & Locking, Weston-super-Mare Central, Weston-super-Mare Hillside, Weston-super-Mare Kewstoke, Weston-super-Mare Mid Worle, Weston-super-Mare Milton, Weston-super-Mare North Worle, Weston-super-Mare South, Weston-super-Mare South Worle, Weston-super-Mare Uphill, Weston-super-Mare Winterstoke, Wick St. Lawrence & St. Georges.	Map showing the location of the Weston-super-Mare constituency in Avon under the boundaries created by the 2023 boundary review and first used at the 2024 general election.

== Boundary changes ==
=== 2024 ===
See 2023 Periodic Review of Westminster constituencies for further details.

Former name	Boundaries 2010–2024	Current name	Boundaries 2024–present
1. Bath BC; 2. Bristol East BC; 3. Bristol North West BC; 4. Bristol South BC; 5. Bristol West BC; 6. Filton and Bradley Stoke CC; 7. Kingswood BC; 8. North East Somerset CC; 9. North Somerset CC; 10. Thornbury and Yate CC; 11. Weston-super-Mare CC	Former constituencies in Avon	1. Bath CC; 2. Bristol Central BC; 3. Bristol East BC; 4. Bristol North East BC; 5. Bristol North West BC; 6. Bristol South BC; 7. Filton and Bradley Stoke BC; 8. Frome and East Somerset CC; 9. North East Somerset and Hanham CC; 10. North Somerset CC; 11. Thornbury and Yate CC; 12. Wells and Mendip Hills CC; 13. Weston-super-Mare CC	Numbered map of the parliamentary constituencies of Avon created by the 2023 boundary review and first used at the 2024 UK general election.

For the 2023 Periodic Review of Westminster constituencies, which redrew the constituency map ahead of the 2024 United Kingdom general election, the Boundary Commission for England opted to combine "Avon" (covering the Bath and North East Somerset, Bristol, North Somerset, and South Gloucestershire council areas) with Devon and Somerset as a sub-region of the South West Region, resulting in significant change to the existing pattern of constituencies. In Avon, Bristol West, Kingswood and North East Somerset were abolished, being replaced by Bristol Central, Bristol North East, and North East Somerset and Hanham. In addition, Frome and East Somerset, and Wells and Mendip Hills were established as cross-authority boundary seats.

The following seats were proposed:

Containing electoral wards from Bath and North East Somerset

- Bath
- Frome and East Somerset (part also in the Somerset District of Mendip)
- North East Somerset and Hanham (part)

Containing electoral wards in Bristol

- Bristol Central
- Bristol East
- Bristol North East (part)
- Bristol North West
- Bristol South

Containing electoral wards in North Somerset

- North Somerset
- Wells and Mendip Hills (parts also in the Somerset Districts of Mendip and Sedgemoor)
- Weston-super-Mare

Containing electoral wards in South Gloucestershire

- Filton and Bradley Stoke
- North East Somerset and Hanham (part)
- North East Bristol (part)
- Thornbury and Yate

=== 2010 ===
Under the Fifth Periodic Review of Westminster constituencies, the Boundary Commission for England decided to increase the number of seats which covered "Avon" from 10 to 11, with the creation of Filton and Bradley Stoke. This resulted in major changes to Kingswood and three of the four Bristol constituencies. A further three constituencies were renamed.

Former name	Boundaries 1997–2010	Former name	Boundaries 2010–2024
1. Bath CC; 2. Bristol East BC; 3. Bristol North West BC; 4. Bristol South BC; 5. Bristol West BC; 6. Kingswood BC; 7. Northavon CC; 8. Wansdyke CC; 9. Weston-super-Mare CC; 10. Woodspring CC	Parliamentary constituencies in Avon	1. Bath BC; 2. Bristol East BC; 3. Bristol North West BC; 4. Bristol South BC; 5. Bristol West BC; 6. Filton and Bradley Stoke CC; 7. Kingswood BC; 8. North East Somerset CC; 9. North Somerset CC; 10. Thornbury and Yate CC; 11. Weston-super-Mare CC	Proposed Revised constituencies in Avon

(The maps on this page do not show the nominal extensions of several constituencies over the waters of the Bristol Channel.)

Other former constituencies in the area were:

- Bristol Central abolished 1974
- Bristol South East abolished 1983
- Bristol North East abolished 1983
- South Gloucestershire abolished 1983

== Results history ==
Primary data source: House of Commons research briefing – General election results from 1918 to 2019

=== 2024 ===
The number of votes cast for each political party who fielded candidates in constituencies comprising Avon in the 2024 general election were as follows:

Party	Votes	%	Change from 2019	Seats	Change from 2019
Labour	189,007	36.2%	▲0.5%	8	▲4
Conservative	110,554	21.2%	▼20.5%	0	▼6
Green	87,204	16.7%	▲11.1%	1	▲1
Liberal Democrat	71,768	13.7%	▼2.1%	2	▲1
Reform	56,721	10.9%	▲10.0	0	0
Others	6,951	1.3%	▲1.0%	0	0
Total	522,205	100.0		11	

=== 2019 ===
The number of votes cast for each political party who fielded candidates in constituencies comprising Avon in the 2019 general election were as follows:

Party	Votes	%	Change from 2017	Seats	Change from 2017
Conservative	258,867	41.7%	▼0.9%	6	0
Labour	221,714	35.7%	▼5.0%	4	0
Liberal Democrats	97,767	15.8%	▲4.0%	1	0
Greens	34,563	5.6%	▲2.1%	0	0
Brexit	5,717	0.9%	new	0	0
Others	1,559	0.3%	▼1.1%	0	0
Total	620,187	100.0		11	

=== Percentage votes ===
Election year	1983	1987	1992	1997	2001	2005	2010	2015	2017	2019	2024
Labour	24.3	24.0	27.5	36.5	36.8	31.8	23.2	25.7	40.7	35.7	36.2
Conservative	47.3	47.9	44.5	32.7	31.6	31.9	35.8	39.6	42.6	41.7	21.2
Green Party	–	*	*	*	*	*	1.3	8.7	3.5	5.6	16.7
Liberal Democrat^{1}	27.6	27.0	26.5	26.3	27.9	30.9	34.8	13.6	11.8	15.8	13.7
Reform^{2}	–	–	–	–	–	–	–	–	–	0.9	10.9
UKIP	–	–	–	*	*	*	2.8	12.0	0.6	*	–
Other	0.8	1.1	1.5	4.5	3.7	5.4	2.1	0.4	0.8	0.3	1.3

^{1}1983 & 1987 – Alliance of Liberal Party and Social Democratic Party

^{2}As the Brexit Party in 2019

* Included in Other

=== Seats ===
Election year	1983	1987	1992	1997	2001	2005	2010	2015	2017	2019	2024
Labour	1	1	3	6	6	5	2	3	4	4	8
Liberal Democrat^{1}	0	0	1	3	3	3	3	0	1	1	2
Green	0	0	0	0	0	0	0	0	0	0	1
Conservative	9	9	6	1	1	2	6	8	6	6	0
Total	10	10	10	10	10	10	11	11	11	11	12

^{1}1983 & 1987 – Alliance of Liberal Party and Social Democratic Party

=== Maps ===
==== 1983 to 2019 ====
1983

1987

1992

1997

2001

2005

2010

2015

2017

2019

==== 2024 to present (including cross-boundary constituencies with Somerset) ====
2024

== Historical representation by party ==
Conservative Labour Liberal Democrats Green

Constituency	1983	1987	1992	1997	2001	2005	2010	2015	2017	2019	24	2024
Bath	Patten		Foster					Howlett	Hobhouse			
Bristol East	Sayeed		Corston			McCarthy						
Bristol North West	Stern			Naysmith			Leslie		Jones			
Bristol South	Cocks	Primarolo						Smyth				
Bristol West / Bristol Central (2024)	Waldegrave			Davey		Williams		Debbonaire				Denyer
Filton and Bradley Stoke							Lopresti					Hazelgrove
Kingswood / Bristol North East (2024)	Hayward		Berry				Skidmore				Egan	
Northavon / Thornbury & Yate (2010)	Cope			Webb				Hall				Young
Wansdyke / NE Somerset (2010) / NE Somerset & Hanham (2024)	Aspinwall			Norris			Rees-Mogg					Norris
Weston-super-Mare	Wiggin			Cotter		Penrose						Aldridge
Woodspring / North Somerset (2010)	Dean		Fox									Al-Hassan

== See also ==
- List of constituencies in South West England
