= Courtenay Warner =

British politician (1857-1934)

Colonel Sir Courtenay Warner 1st Baronet CB
- Sir Courtenay Warner

Member of Parliament (MP) for North Somerset
- In office 1892–1895
- Preceded by: Evan Henry Llewellyn
- Succeeded by: Evan Henry Llewellyn

Member of Parliament (MP) for Lichfield
- In office 1896–1923
- Preceded by: Henry Charles Fulford
- Succeeded by: Frank Hodges

Lord Lieutenant of Suffolk
- In office 1910–1934
- Preceded by: Sir William Brampton Gurdon
- Succeeded by: The Earl of Stradbroke

Personal details
- Born: Thomas Courtenay Theydon Warner; 19 July 1857
- Died: 15 December 1934 (aged 77)
- Resting place: St Mary's, Thorpe Morieux, Suffolk
- Party: Liberal Party; Coalition Liberal; National Liberal
- Military career
- Allegiance: United Kingdom
- Branch: British Army
- Service years: 1901–1910
- Rank: Lieutenant-colonel
- Unit: Oxfordshire and Buckinghamshire Light Infantry

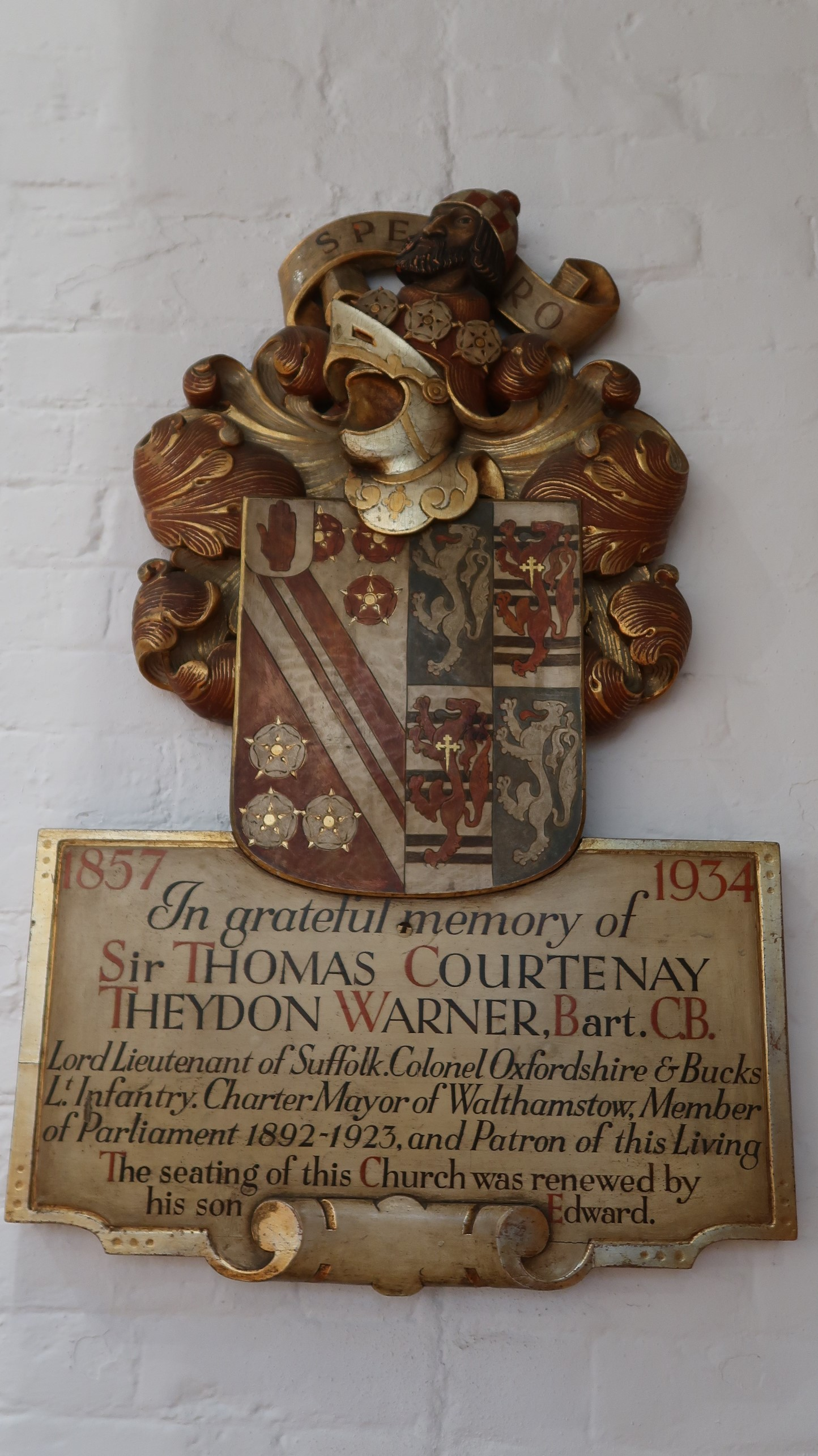
Sir Thomas Courtenay Theydon Warner - In grateful memory - St Peter in the Forest, Walthamstow

Colonel Sir Thomas Courtenay Theydon Warner, 1st Baronet CB (19 July 1857 – 15 December 1934) was a British politician, who served as the Member of Parliament (MP) for North Somerset from 1892 to 1895, and for Lichfield from 1896 to 1923.

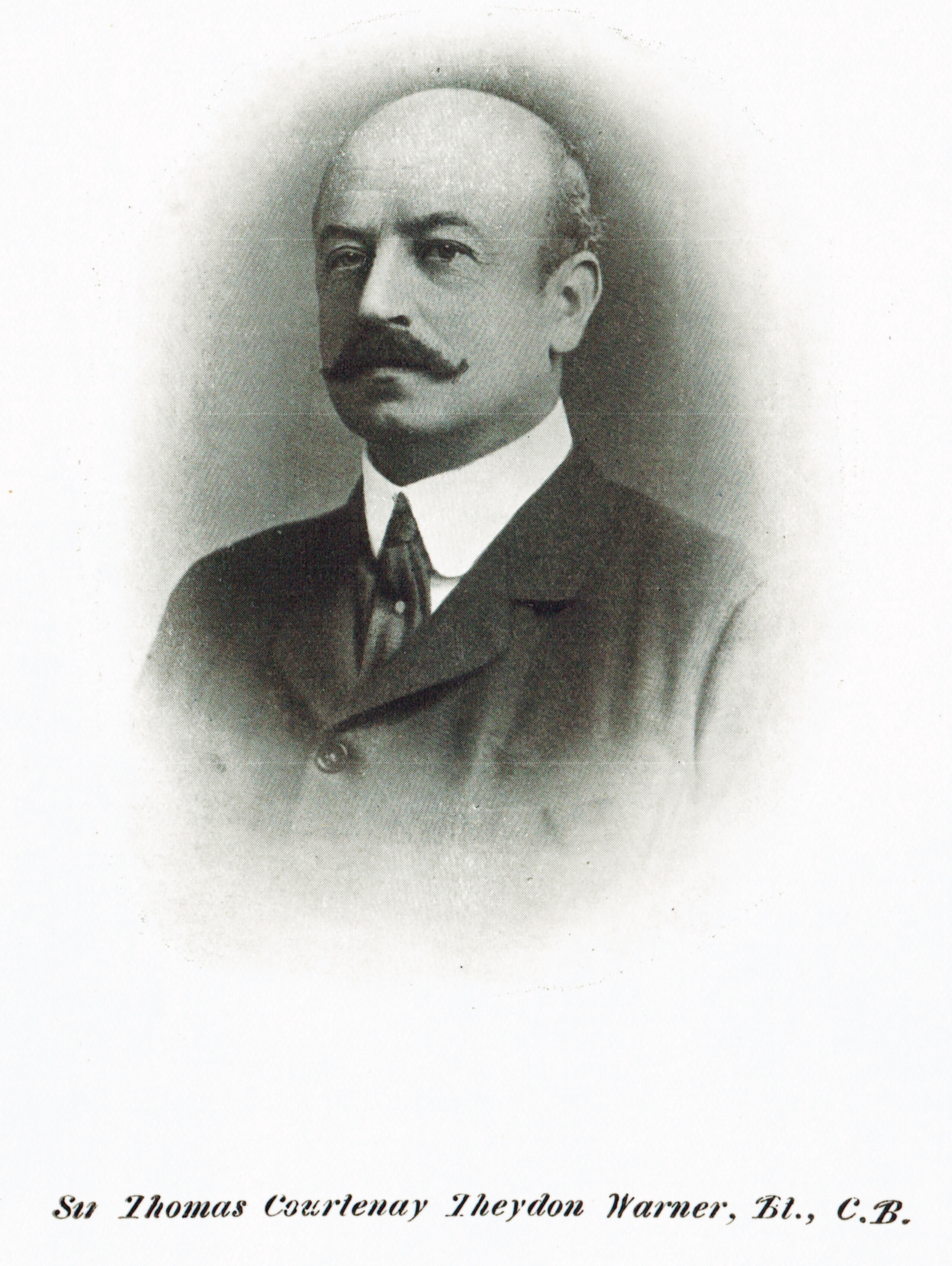
Sir Courtenay Warner, about 1911

Warner was an officer in the 3rd (Militia) Battalion, Oxfordshire and Buckinghamshire Light Infantry, where he became major on 13 January 1902. He received the honorary rank of lieutenant-colonel on 2 August 1902, and later served as lieutenant-colonel in command and honorary colonel of the battalion. He received the CB on 25 June 1909, and was made a baronet on 9 July 1910, of Brettenham Park, Suffolk.

Initially a member of the Liberal Party, he stood at the 1918 general election as a Coalition Liberal, and at the 1922 general election as National Liberal. He was also the first mayor of the Municipal Borough of Walthamstow after its incorporation in 1929.

Sir Courtenay Warner lived in the former Manor House of Highams, which was sold to Essex County Council 1922 for £7000. It is now Woodford County High School for Girls. Plans were drawn up to construct housing for the middle classes on 90 acres of the estate; this development is known as the Highams Estate and was completed in 1934.

He gave his name to the Warner Flats on the Warner Estate, the popular type of housing in Walthamstow which he was responsible for developing. His ancestors built the Grade II listed Clock House villa in Walthamstow (now flats). His son Edward renewed the seating (pews) at the St Peter in the Forest parish church building on the edge of Epping Forest in Walthamstow and arranged for a wall plaque to be erected in the building to his father. The pews were removed during the recent restoration but the plaque has been kept.

His grave lies in the churchyard of St Mary's, Thorpe Morieux, Suffolk. There is a memorial window to him in the nearby Brettenham church too.

Parliament of the United Kingdom
Preceded by Evan Henry Llewellyn	Member of Parliament for North Somerset; 1892–1895	Succeeded by Evan Henry Llewellyn
Preceded by Henry Charles Fulford	Member of Parliament for Lichfield; 1896–1923	Succeeded by Frank Hodges
Honorary titles
Preceded by Sir William Brampton Gurdon	Lord Lieutenant of Suffolk; 1910–1934	Succeeded by The Earl of Stradbroke
Baronetage of the United Kingdom
New creation	Baronet (of Brettenham Park, Suffolk); 1910–1934	Succeeded by Edward Warner
