= Henry Fulford =

Henry Fulford may refer to:

- Henry English Fulford (1859–1929), British diplomat
- Henry Charles Fulford, British Liberal Party politician
