= Evan Henry Llewellyn =

British politician

Colonel Evan Henry Llewellyn JP DL
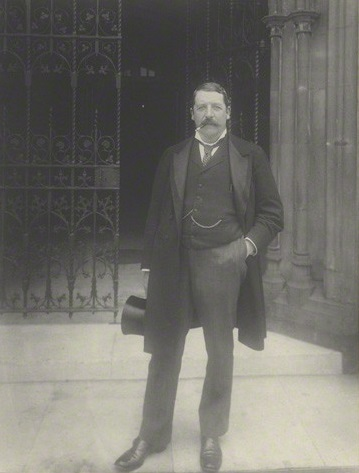

Member of Parliament for North Somerset
- In office 1895–1906
- Preceded by: Courtenay Warner
- Succeeded by: William Henry Bateman Hope
- In office 1885–1892
- Preceded by: New constituency
- Succeeded by: Courtenay Warner

Personal details
- Born: 25 February 1847
- Died: 27 February 1914 (aged 67)
- Spouse: Mary Blanche Somers (m. 1868; died 1900)
- Relations: William Somers Llewellyn (grandson)
- Parent(s): Llewellyn Llewellyn; Eliza William Strick
- Education: Rugby School

Colonel Evan Henry Llewellyn JP DL (25 February 1847 – 27 February 1914) was a British Army officer and a Conservative politician who sat in the House of Commons between 1885 and 1906.

== Early life ==
Llewellyn was born on 25 February 1847. He was the fourth son of the former Eliza William Strick (daughter of John Strick of Swansea) and Llewellyn Llewellyn of Buckland Filleigh, North Devon. His sister, Rose Cecilia Llewellyn, married Adm. Sir Charles Lionel Vaughan-Lee (son of Vaughan Vaughan-Lee).

He was educated at Rugby School.

== Career ==
He served in the British Army, where he was an officer in the 4th (Militia) battalion of the Somersetshire Light Infantry. Following the outbreak of the Second Boer War in late 1899, he volunteered for active service when the battalion was embodied that December, and left Southampton for South Africa on the SS Kildonan Castle in early March 1900. He was later the commander of the 2nd (Central African) Battalion, King's African Rifles.

=== Political career ===
In the 1885 general election, Llewellyn was elected as Member of Parliament (MP) for North Somerset and held the seat until the 1892 general election. He was re-elected for the seat in the 1895 general election and held it through the 1900 election until the 1906 general election. However, he had by February 1903 indicated his intent to step down at the next election, which only took place three years later in 1906.

He was a Justice of the Peace and Deputy Lieutenant of Somerset.

== Personal life ==
In 1868, Llewellyn married Mary Blanche Somers (1847–1900), a daughter of Elizabeth Williams and Thomas Somers of Mendip-Lodge, Somerset. Together, they lived at Langford Court, Somerset and were the parents of:

- Capt. Llewellyn Thomas Evan Llewellyn (b. c. 1869), who married Maud Violet Saunderson, a daughter of Somerset Bassett Saunderson and granddaughter of Col. A. Saunderson, in 1899.
- Owen John Llewellyn (1870–1943), who married Anna Elizabeth Mann, daughter of William John Mann of Highfield, Trowbridge.
- Sir Hoel Llewellyn (1871–1945), who also served with distinction in the Second Boer War; he married Winifred Florence Berens, a daughter of Alexander Augustus Berens, in 1902. After her death in 1931, he married Mary Constance Sandeman, a daughter of Walter Albert Sandeman.
- Arthur Llewellyn (1873–1920), who Meriel Byrne, a daughter of F.W. Byrne, in 1895.
- Mary Mercy Llewellyn (1884–1956), who married Maj. Antony Hubert Gibbs, son of Antony Gibbs, in 1899.

Llewellyn's wife died in 1900 and he died of heart failure after a severe attack of bronchitis on 27 February 1914.

=== Descendants ===
Through his son Owen, he was a grandfather of Rt. Rev. William Somers Llewellyn (1907–2001), Bishop of Lynn from 1963 to 1972.

He is the great-great-grandfather of David Cameron, who was Prime Minister of the United Kingdom from 2010 to 2016.

Parliament of the United Kingdom
Preceded by (new constituency)	Member of Parliament for North Somerset; 1885–1892	Succeeded by Courtenay Warner
Preceded by Courtenay Warner	Member of Parliament for North Somerset; 1895–1906	Succeeded by William Henry Bateman Hope
