= 1896 Lichfield by-election =

UK parliamentary by-election

The 1896 Lichfield by-election was a Parliamentary by-election held on 26 February 1896. The constituency returned one Member of Parliament (MP) to the House of Commons of the United Kingdom, elected by the first past the post voting system.

Fulford's election in 1895 was voided on petition on 19 December 1895 and a by-election ensued.

H.C. Fulford

== Results ==
1896 Lichfield by-election
Party	Candidate	Votes	%	±%
Liberal	Courtenay Warner	4,483	53.1	+2.8
Liberal Unionist	Leonard Darwin	3,955	46.9	–2.8
Majority		528	6.2	+5.6
Turnout		8,438	90.3	+5.2
Registered electors		9,348		
Liberal hold		Swing	+2.8	

General election 1895: Lichfield
Party	Candidate	Votes	%	±%
Liberal	Henry Charles Fulford	3,902	50.3	+0.4
Liberal Unionist	Leonard Darwin	3,858	49.7	−0.4
Majority		44	0.6	N/A
Turnout		7,760	85.1	+3.7
Registered electors		9,123		
Liberal gain from Liberal Unionist		Swing	+0.4	

Warner
