= William Henry Bateman Hope =

British Liberal Party politician

William Hope

William Henry Bateman Hope (28 March 1865 – December 1919) was a British Liberal Party politician.

== Background ==
He was born in 1865, a son of William Carey Hope of Bath, Somerset. He was educated at Eton before moving on to Trinity College, Cambridge in 1884. He received a BA in 1887. In 1890 he married Agnes Stothert of Bath.

In 1892 he bought Eastwood Manor in East Harptree. He extended the house and had electrical wiring installed making it one of the first in the county of Somerset to have electric lights.

== Career ==
He was admitted to the Inner Temple in 1887. He was Called to the Bar in 1891. He practised on the Western Circuit. He served as a Justice of the Peace in Somerset. He was elected to Somerset County Council in 1898. He contested Somerset North at the general election of 1900 but did not win. He was elected at the 1906 General Election when he gained North Somerset from the Conservative. He sat for one full term before retiring ahead of the next general election in January 1910. He was Recorder of Wells from 1907 to 1915. He stood down from Somerset County Council in 1914 after 16 years service. He died in 1919 aged 54.

== Sources ==
- Liberal Yearbook 1908
- British parliamentary election results 1885–1918, Craig, F. W. S.

Parliament of the United Kingdom
Preceded by Evan Henry Llewellyn	Member of Parliament for Somerset North; 1906–January 1910	Succeeded by Joseph King
