= Ted Leather =

Canadian-born British Conservative politician

Sir Ted Leather KCMG KCVO

Governor of Bermuda
- In office 1973–1977
- Monarch: Elizabeth II
- Preceded by: Sir Richard Sharples
- Succeeded by: Sir Peter Ramsbotham

Member of Parliament for North Somerset
- In office 23 February 1950 – 25 September 1964
- Preceded by: New constituency
- Succeeded by: Paul Dean

Personal details
- Born: Edwin Hartley Cameron Leather; 22 May 1919 Toronto, Ontario, Canada
- Died: 5 April 2005 (aged 85)
- Citizenship: Canada; United Kingdom (from 1962)
- Party: Conservative
- Spouse: Sheila Greenlees (m. 1940; died 1994)
- Children: 2
- Education: Royal Military College of Canada
- Awards: Knight Bachelor; Knight Commander of the Order of St Michael and St George; Knight Commander of the Royal Victorian Order; Venerable Order of Saint John

Military service
- Allegiance: Canada
- Branch/service: Toronto Scottish and Royal Canadian Artillery
- Rank: Captain
- Unit: 1st Canadian Parachute Battalion
- Battles/wars: Second World War

Sir Edwin Hartley Cameron Leather KCMG KCVO (22 May 1919 – 5 April 2005) was a Canadian-born British Conservative politician. He served as Governor and Commander-in-Chief of the British colony of Bermuda from 1973 to 1977.

Leather served during World War II as an officer, first with the 1st Canadian Parachute Battalion and later with the Toronto Scottish and Royal Canadian Artillery. After the war, he worked as an insurance broker in England. In 1950, he was elected to the UK Parliament as the member for North Somerset. He was a backbencher throughout the period of Conservative governments from 1951–1964. He became a UK citizen and was knighted in 1962. Poor health caused him to retire as an MP in 1964. Following the murder of Sir Richard Sharples, Leather was appointed Governor of Bermuda in 1973. He served in the post until 1977 when he retired but remained on the island.

== Education ==
Leather was born in Hamilton, Ontario on 22 May 1919, the son of Harold and Grace Leather. Leather's father was the founder of a trucking business. Leather was educated at Hillfield Strathallan College, Trinity College School, Port Hope. He graduated from the Royal Military College of Canada in Kingston, Ontario, in 1937.

He was awarded an Honorary Degree (Doctor of Laws) from the University of Bath in 1976.

== Career ==
=== Military service ===
During the Second World War, Captain Leather served with the 1st Canadian Parachute Battalion, Canadian Army in England and Europe. He was badly injured in a practice jump when his parachute failed to open. He rejoined his Battalion for D-Day. He served in Europe during World War II with the Toronto Scottish and Royal Canadian Artillery. He wrote a manual for the Home Guard called "Combat without Weapons". He worked as an insurance broker in England and was secretary of the Central London branch of the Association of Supervisory Staff, Executives and Technicians.

=== Member of UK Parliament ===
At the 1945 general election, Leather stood without success in the Bristol South constituency, but at the 1950 general election he was elected as Member of Parliament (MP) for North Somerset. He was a backbencher throughout the period of Conservative governments from 1951–1964. He supported the unions, and held office in the Association of Supervisory Staffs, Executives and Technicians and supported the miners. Leather never held political office but was a popular speaker at party conferences and other events, as well as on radio and television. He was a One Nation Tory; he forcefully opposed racism and supported the European Union.

Leather was proposed for a knighthood but, still a Canadian citizen, required the support of the Canadian government which had not made any honour recommendation for some years; Prime Minister John Diefenbaker declined to support the recommendation.

Leather was eventually knighted in 1962 when he was made a Knight Bachelor, having taken British citizenship. He quit Westminster in 1964. Poor health and the low pay for MPs forced Leather to retire from Parliament at the 1964 general election and enter business. He returned to the political scene a few years later, as vice-chairman of the National Union of Conservative and Unionist Associations, taking a leading role in fundraising and at party conference.

=== Governor of Bermuda ===
In 1973, following the murder of Sir Richard Sharples, Leather was appointed Governor of Bermuda. Despite the assassination of his predecessor and an aide, he lived informally and mixed with locals. He continued to live in Bermuda after his retirement in 1977. He came to the attention of the Commissioner of the Bermuda Police Force after riding his bicycle recklessly. He became the local representative of N M Rothschild & Sons and wrote several thrillers. As Governor, his nickname was "Imperial Leather", a pun on his surname, position and the famous brand of soap.

He was appointed KCMG in 1974 and in 1975 became the first Canadian to be appointed KCVO since the future 1st Lord Shaughnessy in 1907. Leather was an active freemason and an Anglican lay reader.

During his time as Governor of Bermuda, Sir Edwin made a significant effort to include a number of influential Bermudians as part of the vice-regal household. Among them were Rev. Thomas Nisbett, Bermuda's first Black Church of England priest (later Canon Thomas Nisbett), and Major Clinton Eugene Raynor, promoted to Lieutenant-Colonel and appointed Commanding Officer of the Bermuda Regiment, the local-service regiment of the British Army organised on territorial lines, from 1980 to 1984 (Lt-Col Clinton Eugene Raynor, OBE, ED, JP, was later Honorary Colonel of the Royal Bermuda Regiment).

== Personal life ==
Leather married Sheila Greenlees in 1940; they had two daughters. Leather's home was Park House, Batheaston. His wife predeceased him in 1994.

Leather was an accomplished gymnast and founded the International Sports Fellowship.

During the First World War, Leather's father, Harold, served in East Africa with the Army Service Corps, finishing the war as a lieutenant. Upon his return to Canada he established Leather Cartage in Hamilton Ontario. During the Second World War, Harold Leather was made a Member of the Order of the British Empire (1943) for his work in coordinating the Red Cross parcel scheme in Canada. He would go on to become Chairman of the Canadian Red Cross Society.

== Publications ==
- Sir Edwin Leather monograph, 'Memorandum on a Choice of Countries', 1943.
- Sir Edwin Leather 'Human Nature and the Profit Motive', ts. draft for book begun 12 April 1943. The novel features the character, Rupert Conway, of Leather's previous three novels.
- Sir Edwin Leather 'Combat without Weapons', handbook, Aldershot: Gale & Polden, 1942
- The Vienna Elephant (Dodd, Mead 1977, Macmillan 1978, Pinnacle p/b 1981)
- The Mozart Score (Doubleday 1979, Macmillan 1979)
- The Duveen Letter (Doubleday 1980, Macmillan 1980)

Parliament of the United Kingdom
Preceded by (new constituency)	Member of Parliament for North Somerset; 1950–1964	Succeeded by Paul Dean
Political offices
Preceded by Sir Richard Sharples	Governor of Bermuda; 1973–1977	Succeeded by Sir Peter Ramsbotham

== Bibliography ==
- Preston, Adrian & Dennis, Peter (eds.) (1976) Swords and Covenants. Totowa: Rowman and Littlefield (#4237)
- Preston, Richard Arthur (1969) To Serve Canada: a History of the Royal Military College of Canada. Toronto: University of Toronto Press (#H16511)
  - Preston, Richard Arthur (1982) Canada's RMC: a History of Royal Military College; 2nd ed. (#H16511)
- Preston, Richard Arthur (1968) R.M.C. and Kingston: the effect of imperial and military influences on a Canadian community. Kingston, Ontario (#H16511)
- Smith, R. Guy C. (ed.) (1984) As You Were! Ex-Cadets Remember. 2 vols. Volume I: 1876–1918. Volume II: 1919–1984. Kingston, Ont.: RMC; The R.M.C. Club of Canada (#H1877)
