= Paul Dean, Baron Dean of Harptree =

British politician (1924–2009)

The Right Honourable The Lord Dean of Harptree PC

Deputy Speaker of the House of Commons
- In office 28 May 1982 – 6 May 1992
- Monarch: Elizabeth II
- Prime Minister: Margaret Thatcher; John Major
- Speaker: Viscount Tonypandy; Bernard Weatherill

First Deputy Chairman of Ways and Means
- In office 11 June 1987 – 6 May 1992
- Speaker: Bernard Weatherill
- Preceded by: Ernest Armstrong
- Succeeded by: Geoffrey Lofthouse

Second Deputy Chairman of Ways and Means
- In office 28 May 1982 – 11 June 1987
- Speaker: Viscount Tonypandy; Bernard Weatherill
- Preceded by: Ernest Armstrong
- Succeeded by: Betty Boothroyd

Member of Parliament for Woodspring North Somerset (1964–1983)
- In office 15 October 1964 – 16 March 1992
- Preceded by: Ted Leather
- Succeeded by: Liam Fox

Member of the House of Lords
- Lord Temporal
- Life peerage 5 October 1993 – 1 April 2009

Personal details
- Born: 14 September 1924 Northwich, Cheshire, England
- Died: 1 April 2009 (aged 84) Banwell, Weston-super-Mare, Somerset, England
- Party: Conservative
- Education: Exeter College, Oxford

Arthur Paul Dean, Baron Dean of Harptree, PC (14 September 1924 – 1 April 2009) was a British politician who held a seat in the House of Commons from 1964 until 1992. He was a member of the Conservative Party.

== Early life and Second World War ==
Paul Dean was born in Northwich, Cheshire, England, on 14 September 1924, and was educated at Ellesmere College and Exeter College, Oxford. He served with the Welsh Guards during the Second World War, being commissioned in that regiment on 28 January 1944, with the service number of 307877. He fought with the regiment's 2nd Battalion, part of the Guards Armoured Division under Major General Allan Adair, in the Battle of Normandy where he was wounded. Shortly after the end of World War II in Europe Dean served in Germany with the British Army of the Rhine (BAOR) as aide-de-camp (ADC) to the General Officer Commanding (GOC) I Corps, initially Lieutenant-General Sir John Crocker and then Lieutenant-General Sidney Kirkman before Lieutenant-General Ivor Thomas took over from September 1945. Dean retired from the army in 1949.

== Political career ==
In 1962 Dean was the Conservative candidate in a by-election for the very safe Labour seat of Pontefract; he was defeated by Joseph Harper.

He was member of parliament for North Somerset from 1964 to 1983, and after boundary changes, for Woodspring from 1983 until his retirement in 1992, preceding Liam Fox. Dean was a junior minister for Health and Social Security during the 1970–1974 Conservative government. From 1982 until his retirement, he was a Deputy Speaker of the House of Commons firstly under George Thomas and then Bernard Weatherill. He was knighted in the 1985 New Year Honours. When in the chair of the Commons on 21 June 1990, Dean was required to use his casting vote.

== House of Lords ==
On 12 October 1993 he was created a life peer as Baron Dean of Harptree, of Wedmore in the County of Somerset. He served as Deputy Speaker in the House of Lords.

== Personal life ==
Dean was married twice. His first wife, Doris, died in 1979. He married Peggy Dierden in 1980. They lived at Banwell near Weston-super-Mare in Somerset.

Parliament of the United Kingdom
Preceded by Sir Ted Leather	Member of Parliament for North Somerset; 1964 – 1983	Constituency abolished
New constituency	Member of Parliament for Woodspring; 1983 – 1992	Succeeded by Liam Fox
Preceded by Ernest Armstrong	Deputy Speaker of the House of Commons; 28 May 1982 – 6 May 1992	Succeeded by Betty Boothroyd
