= Sadik Al-Hassan =

British politician

Sadik Al-Hassan MP
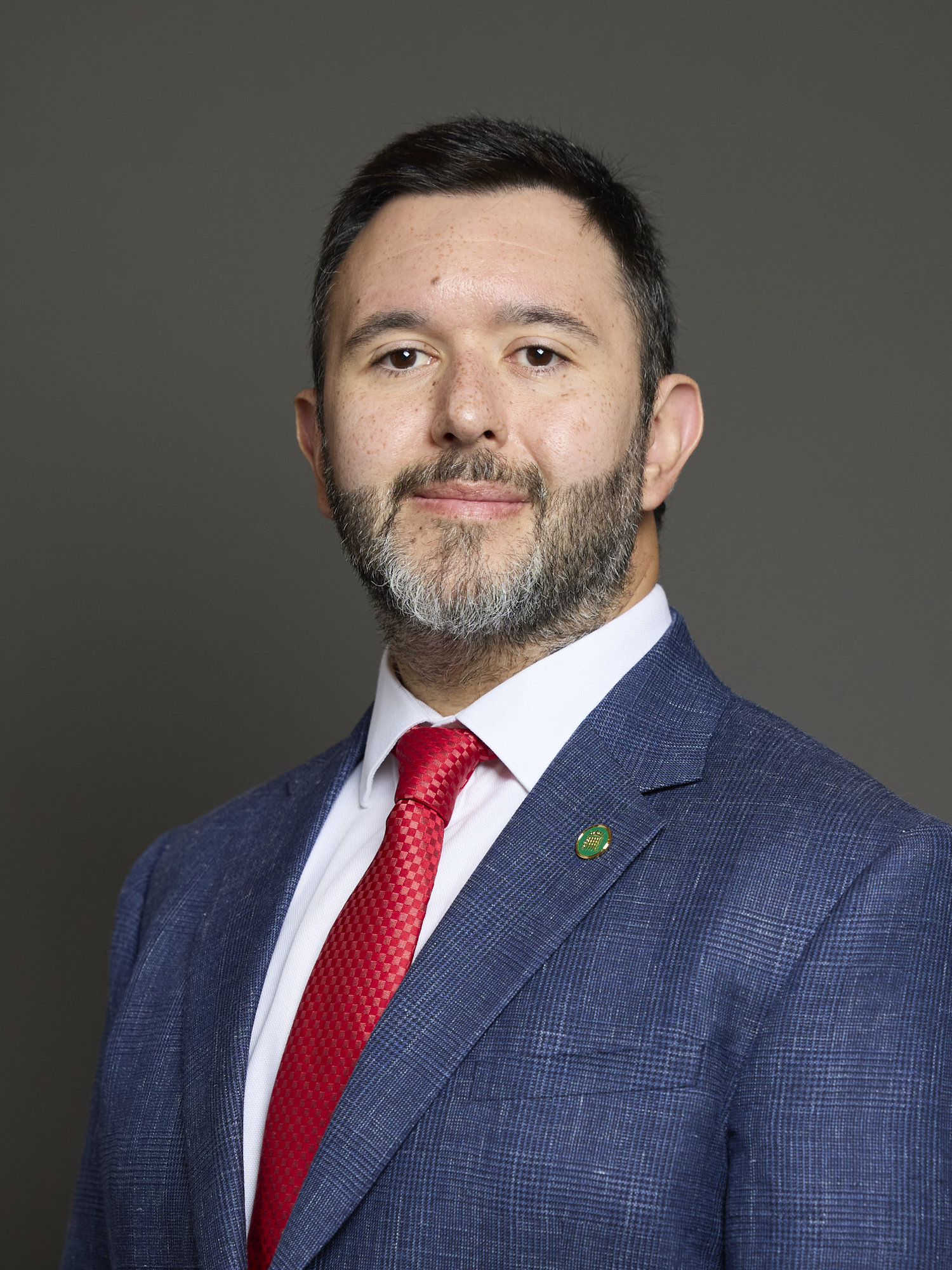
- Official portrait, 2024

Member of Parliament for North Somerset
- Incumbent
- Assumed office 4 July 2024
- Preceded by: Liam Fox
- Majority: 639 (1.2%)

Personal details
- Born: Sadik Adam Al-Hassan; 17 December 1984 (age 41)
- Party: Labour
- Children: 2
- Education: University of Bath (MPharm)

Sadik Adam Al-Hassan (born 17 December 1984) is a British Labour Party politician and pharmacist who has been the Member of Parliament for North Somerset since 2024. He gained the seat from Liam Fox, a Conservative.

== Early life and career ==
Al-Hassan was born to an Iraqi father and an Irish mother. His father, a civil servant, arrived in Britain in the 1970s. Al-Hassan attended Calday Grange Grammar School in the Wirral. He graduated from the University of Bath in 2007 with a Master of Pharmacy.

Al-Hassan was a store manager at Boots in Wirral for three years and worked at Well Pharmacy for over seven years as an area operations manager and a branch manager. At time of election, he worked in Cribbs Causeway as the superintendent pharmacist of the online PillTime, which has about 200,000 nominated patients all around the UK.

== Political career ==
Al-Hassan was 6th on Labour's list of candidates for the South West England region in the 2019 European Parliament elections and was not elected.

He was selected as Labour's candidate for North Somerset in the 2024 general election and ran on a platform of rebuilding the NHS. He also expressed concern over pharmacies closing in the local area. He defeated the incumbent Conservative Party candidate Liam Fox, who had been the MP for the area (North Somerset and previously Woodspring) for three decades.

In November 2024, he joined a group of fellow medic MPs to call for Parliament to back assisted dying legislation.

== Personal life ==
Married with 2 children, Al-Hassan is one of 18 Labour Muslim MPs elected in the last election. As of 2025, he lives in Pill.

Parliament of the United Kingdom
| Preceded by Liam Fox | Member of Parliament for North Somerset; 2024–present | Incumbent |
