= North Somerset (constituency) =

UK Parliament constituency (since 2010)

- County constituency for the House of Commons
- Interactive map of boundaries since 2024
- Boundary of North Somerset in South West England
- County: Somerset
- Electorate: 73,963 (2023)
- Major settlements: Clevedon, Nailsea and Portishead

Current constituency
- Created: 2010
- Member of Parliament: Sadik Al-Hassan (Labour)
- Seats: One
- Created from: Woodspring

1950–1983
- Created from: Frome and Weston-super-Mare
- Replaced by: Woodspring, Wansdyke and Wells

1885–1918
- Created from: East Somerset
- Replaced by: Frome and Weston-super-Mare

North Somerset is a constituency (Note: A county constituency (for the purposes of election expenses and type of returning officer).) represented in the House of Commons of the UK Parliament since 2024 by Sadik Al-Hassan of the Labour Party. (Note: As with all constituencies, the constituency elects one Member of Parliament (MP) by the first past the post system of election at least every five years.)

== Constituency profile ==
North Somerset is a constituency in Somerset in South West England, occupying the eastern half of the local government authority of the same name. Its largest town is Portishead, which has a population of around 27,000. Other settlements include the towns of Clevedon and Nailsea and the villages of Backwell, Long Ashton and Pill.

This constituency is located along the Severn Estuary coast and covers the towns and villages to the west of the city of Bristol. Portishead and Clevedon are coastal towns; Portishead is historically a fishing port whilst Clevedon grew during the Victorian era as a popular seaside resort. Nailsea lies within the Somerset Coalfield and is one of the few towns in Southern England with a history of coal mining. Bristol Airport and the Royal Portbury Dock are both located in the constituency and are significant local employers. This is one of the country's most affluent constituencies, with most of it falling within the top 10% least-deprived areas in England. House prices here are generally higher than regional and UK averages.

North Somerset has a high proportion of older working-age adults and retirees and a low young adult population. In general, residents are well-educated and have high rates of homeownership. Household income is high and the child poverty rate is less than half the UK-wide figure. A high proportion of residents work in professional occupations, particularly in the transport and public sectors, and the percentage claiming unemployment benefits is very low. White people made up 96% of the population at the 2021 census.

Local politics are mixed. At the local council, Portishead and Nailsea are mostly represented by independents and localists. Clevedon primarily elected Conservatives and the rural inland areas are represented by Green Party councillors. An estimated 53% of voters in North Somerset supported remaining in the European Union in the 2016 referendum, higher than the UK-wide figure of 48%.

== History ==
Earlier versions of the seat existed in 1885–1918 and 1950–1983.

First creation

Parliament passed the Redistribution of Seats Act 1885 creating the larger constituency of North Somerset from the 1885 general election, which was later abolished for the 1918 general election.

Second creation

North Somerset was re-established for the 1950 general election, and abolished again for the 1983 general election.

Third creation

Following the review of parliamentary representation in the North Somerset district by the Boundary Commission for England, the former Woodspring constituency was renamed as North Somerset without substantial boundary changes.

The Woodspring seat returned Conservative MPs, and had been held by Liam Fox from 1992 until its abolition. Fox won the new constituency by nearly 14 percentage points over the Liberal Democrats in 2010, while Labour took second place in 2015, 2017 and 2019. In 2024, with the Conservatives doing poorly around Bristol and surrounding constituencies in losing all their seats, Sadik Al-Hassan was elected as MP - the first to have been returned to Parliament for the Labour Party.

== Boundaries ==
Map of boundaries 2010–2024

1885–1918: The Sessional Divisions of Keynsham, Long Ashton, and Temple Cloud, and the civil parishes of Binegar, Chilcompton, and Midsomer Norton.

1950–1983: The Urban Districts of Keynsham, Norton Radstock, and Portishead, the Rural Districts of Bathavon and Clutton, and part of the Rural District of Long Ashton.

2010–2024: The District of North Somerset wards of Backwell, Clevedon Central, Clevedon East, Clevedon North, Clevedon South, Clevedon Walton, Clevedon West, Clevedon Yeo, Easton-in-Gordano, Gordano, Nailsea East, Nailsea North and West, Pill, Portishead Central, Portishead Coast, Portishead East, Portishead Redcliffe Bay, Portishead South and North Weston, Portishead West, Winford, Wraxall and Long Ashton, Wrington, and Yatton.

2024–present: The District of North Somerset wards of: Backwell; Clevedon East; Clevedon South; Clevedon Walton; Clevedon West; Clevedon Yeo; Gordano Valley; Long Ashton; Nailsea Golden Valley; Nailsea West End; Nailsea Yeo; Nailsea Youngwood; Pill; Portishead East; Portishead North; Portishead South; Portishead West; Winford; Wrington.

Further to the completion of the 2023 review of Westminster constituencies, the seat was subject to moderate boundary changes involving the loss of the Yatton area which was transferred to the new constituency of Wells and Mendip Hills, first contested at the 2024 general election.

== Members of Parliament ==
Year	Member	Party
1885	Evan Henry Llewellyn	Conservative
1892	Courtenay Warner	Liberal
1895	Evan Henry Llewellyn	Conservative
1906	William Henry Bateman Hope	Liberal
1910	Joseph King	Liberal
1918	constituency abolished	
1950	Sir Ted Leather	Conservative
1964	Paul Dean	Conservative
1983	constituency abolished: see Woodspring	
2010	Liam Fox	Conservative
2024	Sadik Al-Hassan	Labour

== Elections ==
=== Elections in the 2020s ===
General election 2024: North Somerset
Party	Candidate	Votes	%	±%
Labour	Sadik Al-Hassan	19,138	35.6	+10.6
Conservative	Liam Fox	18,499	34.4	−19.1
Liberal Democrats	Ashley Cartman	7,121	13.2	−3.4
Reform	Alexander Kokkinoftas	5,602	10.4	New
Green	Oscar Livesey-Lodwick	3,273	6.1	+1.2
Workers Party	Suneil Basu	133	0.2	New
Majority		639	1.2	N/A
Turnout		53,766	76.3	−0.6
Registered electors		74,426		
Labour gain from Conservative		Swing	+14.8	

=== Elections in the 2010s ===
2019 notional result
Party	Vote	%
Conservative	30,411	53.5
Labour	14,227	25.0
Liberal Democrats	9,425	16.6
Green	2,801	4.9
Turnout	56,864	76.9
Electorate	73,963	

General election 2019: North Somerset
Party	Candidate	Votes	%	±%
Conservative	Liam Fox	32,801	52.9	−1.3
Labour	Hannah Young	15,265	24.6	−2.0
Liberal Democrats	Ashley Cartman	11,051	17.8	+8.2
Green	Phil Neve	2,938	4.7	+1.5
Majority		17,536	28.3	+0.7
Turnout		62,055	77.4	+0.5
Conservative hold		Swing	+0.4	

General election 2017: North Somerset
Party	Candidate	Votes	%	±%
Conservative	Liam Fox	33,605	54.2	+0.7
Labour	Greg Chambers	16,502	26.6	+12.3
Liberal Democrats	Richard Foord	5,982	9.6	−3.1
Independent	Donald Davies	3,929	6.3	New
Green	Charley Pattison	1,976	3.2	−3.3
Majority		17,103	27.6	−11.6
Turnout		61,994	76.9	+3.3
Conservative hold		Swing	−5.8	

General election 2015: North Somerset
Party	Candidate	Votes	%	±%
Conservative	Liam Fox	31,540	53.5	+4.2
Labour	Greg Chambers	8,441	14.3	+3.2
UKIP	Ian Kealey	7,669	13.0	+9.1
Liberal Democrats	Marcus Kravis	7,486	12.7	−23.0
Green	David Derbyshire	3,806	6.5	+6.5
Majority		23,099	39.2	+25.6
Turnout		58,942	73.6	−1.4
Conservative hold		Swing		

General election 2010: North Somerset
Party	Candidate	Votes	%	±%
Conservative	Liam Fox	28,549	49.3	
Liberal Democrats	Brian Mathew	20,687	35.7	
Labour	Steve Parry-Hearn	6,448	11.1	
UKIP	Sue Taylor	2,257	3.9	
Majority		7,862	13.6	
Turnout		57,941	75.0	
Conservative win (new seat)				

=== Elections in the 1970s ===
General election 1979: North Somerset
Party	Candidate	Votes	%	±%
Conservative	Paul Dean	43,173	54.34	+9.4
Labour	AJ Smith	22,122	27.85	−3.8
Liberal	David Sanders	12,898	16.23	−6.7
Ecology	R Carder	1,254	1.58	New
Majority		21,051	26.49	+13.26
Turnout		79,447	82.24	+1.81
Conservative hold		Swing		

General election October 1974: North Somerset
Party	Candidate	Votes	%	±%
Conservative	Paul Dean	32,146	44.88	
Labour	HR White	22,671	31.65	
Liberal	JM Bourne	16,428	22.93	
United Democratic Party	JK Polling	387	0.54	New
Majority		9,475	13.23	
Turnout		71,632	80.43	
Conservative hold		Swing		

General election February 1974: North Somerset
Party	Candidate	Votes	%	±%
Conservative	Paul Dean	34,576	46.09	
Labour	HR White	22,421	29.89	
Liberal	JM Bourne	18,023	24.02	New
Majority		12,155	16.20	
Turnout		75,020	85.06	
Conservative hold		Swing		

General election 1970: North Somerset
Party	Candidate	Votes	%	±%
Conservative	Paul Dean	38,975	58.1	+11.7
Labour	John T Mitchard	28,121	41.9	−0.8
Majority		10,854	16.2	+12.5
Turnout		67,096	79.1	−6.2
Conservative hold		Swing		

=== Elections in the 1960s ===
General election 1966: North Somerset
Party	Candidate	Votes	%	±%
Conservative	Paul Dean	28,824	46.4	±0.0
Labour	Brian Tilley	26,526	42.7	+2.9
Liberal	Mark E Willies	6,745	10.9	−2.9
Majority		2,298	3.7	−2.9
Turnout		62,095	85.3	−0.1
Conservative hold		Swing		

General election 1964: Somerset North
Party	Candidate	Votes	%	±%
Conservative	Paul Dean	27,814	46.4	−9.9
Labour	DT White	23,896	39.8	−3.9
Liberal	Mark E Willies	8,253	13.8	New
Majority		3,918	6.6	−6.0
Turnout		59,963	85.4	−0.1
Conservative hold		Swing		

=== Elections in the 1950s ===
General election 1959: Somerset North
Party	Candidate	Votes	%	±%
Conservative	Ted Leather	30,432	56.3	+2.1
Labour	E Fraser Wilde	23,649	43.7	−2.1
Majority		6,783	12.6	+4.2
Turnout		54,081	85.5	+0.1
Conservative hold		Swing		

General election 1955: Somerset North
Party	Candidate	Votes	%	±%
Conservative	Ted Leather	26,985	54.2	+1.8
Labour	David Llewellyn	22,802	45.8	−1.8
Majority		4,183	8.4	+3.6
Turnout		54,081	85.4	
Conservative hold		Swing		

General election 1951: Somerset North
Party	Candidate	Votes	%	±%
Conservative	Ted Leather	27,465	52.4	+6.8
Labour	Robert J Hurst	24,917	47.6	+3.8
Majority		2,548	4.8	+3.0
Turnout		52,382		
Conservative hold		Swing		

General election 1950: Somerset North
Party	Candidate	Votes	%	±%
Conservative	Ted Leather	23,953	45.6	
Labour	Xenia Field	23,050	43.8	
Liberal	Albert Ernest Whitcher	5,573	10.6	
Majority		903	1.8	
Turnout		52,576	87.7	
Conservative win (new seat)				

== Election results 1885–1918 ==
=== Elections in the 1880s ===
Strachey

General election 1885: North Somerset
Party	Candidate	Votes	%	±%
Conservative	Evan Henry Llewellyn	4,170	54.4	
Liberal	Edward Strachey	3,491	45.6	
Majority		679	8.8	
Turnout		7,661	75.0	
Registered electors		10,209		
Conservative win (new seat)				

General election 1886: North Somerset
Party	Candidate	Votes	%	±%
Conservative	Evan Henry Llewellyn	4,252	67.1	+12.7
Liberal	James Dormer Marshall	2,087	32.9	−12.7
Majority		2,165	34.2	+25.4
Turnout		6,339	62.1	−12.9
Registered electors		10,209		
Conservative hold		Swing	+12.7	

=== Elections in the 1890s ===
Warner

General election 1892: North Somerset
Party	Candidate	Votes	%	±%
Liberal	Courtenay Warner	3,920	50.1	+17.2
Conservative	Evan Henry Llewellyn	3,901	49.9	−17.2
Majority		19	0.2	N/A
Turnout		7,821	77.5	+15.4
Registered electors		10,086		
Liberal gain from Conservative		Swing	+17.2	

General election 1895: North Somerset
Party	Candidate	Votes	%	±%
Conservative	Evan Henry Llewellyn	4,652	54.0	+4.1
Liberal	Courtenay Warner	3,966	46.0	−4.1
Majority		686	8.0	N/A
Turnout		8,618	84.4	+6.9
Registered electors		10,208		
Conservative gain from Liberal		Swing	+4.1	

=== Elections in the 1900s ===
General election 1900: North Somerset
Party	Candidate	Votes	%	±%
Conservative	Even Llewellyn	4,530	53.0	−1.0
Liberal	William Hope	4,014	47.0	+1.0
Majority		516	6.0	−2.0
Turnout		8,544	80.0	−4.4
Registered electors		10,682		
Conservative hold		Swing	−1.0	

Hope

General election 1906: North Somerset
Party	Candidate	Votes	%	±%
Liberal	William Hope	6,626	60.2	+13.2
Conservative	William Mason	4,380	39.8	−13.2
Majority		2,246	20.4	N/A
Turnout		11,006	88.9	+8.9
Registered electors		12,381		
Liberal gain from Conservative		Swing	+13.2	

=== Elections in the 1910s ===
King

General election January 1910: North Somerset
Party	Candidate	Votes	%	±%
Liberal	Joseph King	6,568	53.2	−7.0
Conservative	Frank Beachim Beauchamp	5,768	46.8	+7.0
Majority		800	6.4	−14.0
Turnout		12,336	91.4	+2.5
Liberal hold		Swing	−7.0	

General election December 1910: North Somerset
Party	Candidate	Votes	%	±%
Liberal	Joseph King	6,299	53.9	+0.7
Conservative	Frank Beachim Beauchamp	5,378	46.1	−0.7
Majority		921	7.8	+1.4
Turnout		11,677	86.5	−4.9
Liberal hold		Swing	+0.7	

General Election 1914–15:

Another General Election was required to take place before the end of 1915. The political parties had been making preparations for an election to take place and by July 1914, the following candidates had been selected;

- Liberal: Joseph King
- Unionist: J Windsor Levis

== See also ==
- List of parliamentary constituencies in Avon
