= Liam Fox =

British politician (born 1961)

The Right Honourable Sir Liam Fox
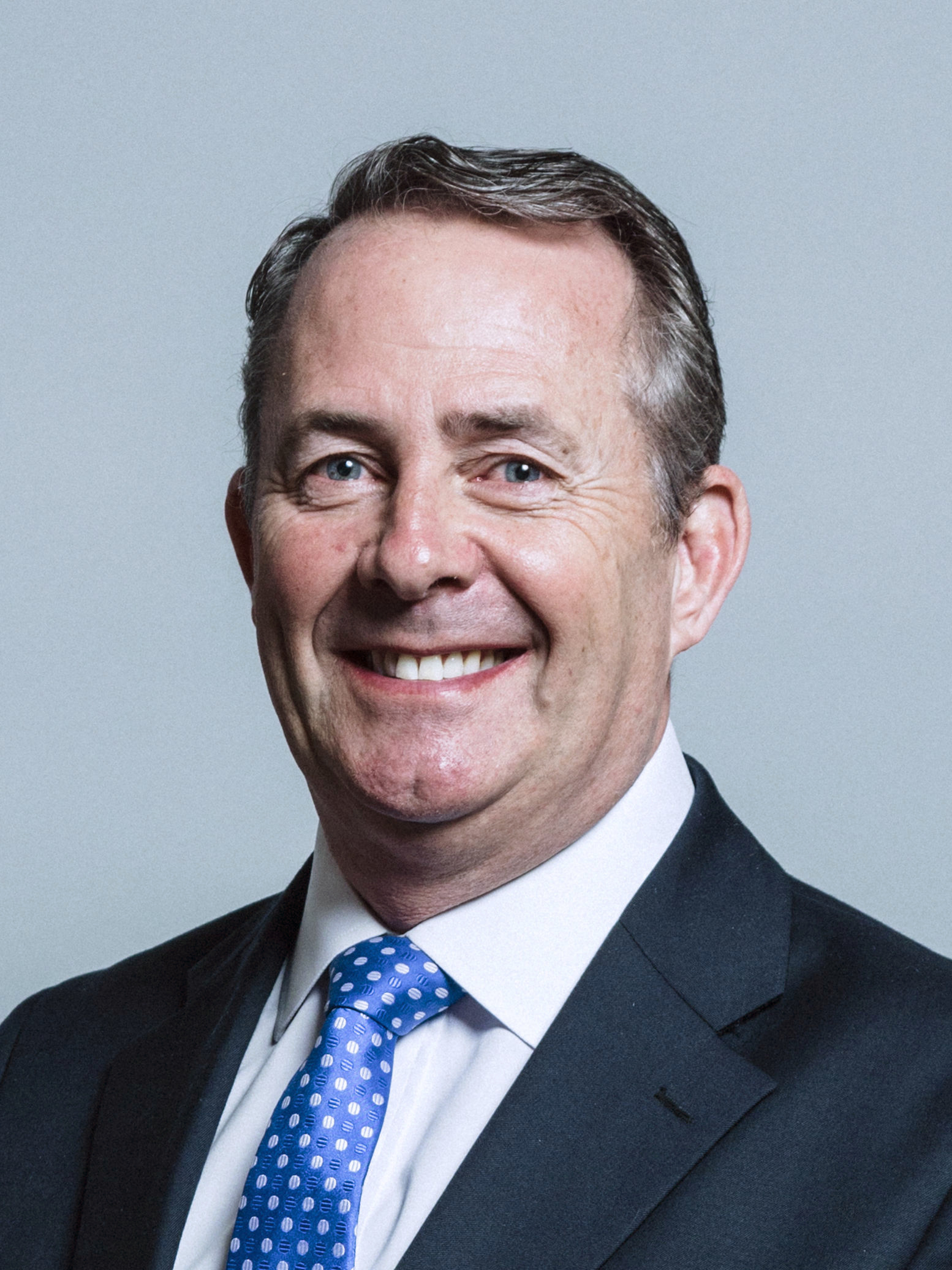
- Official portrait, 2017

Secretary of State for International Trade
- In office 13 July 2016 – 24 July 2019
- Prime Minister: Theresa May
- Preceded by: Office established
- Succeeded by: Liz Truss

President of the Board of Trade
- In office 19 July 2016 – 24 July 2019
- Prime Minister: Theresa May
- Preceded by: Greg Clark
- Succeeded by: Liz Truss

Secretary of State for Defence
- In office 12 May 2010 – 14 October 2011
- Prime Minister: David Cameron
- Preceded by: Bob Ainsworth
- Succeeded by: Philip Hammond

Chairman of the Conservative Party
- In office 6 November 2003 – 4 May 2005; Serving with The Lord Saatchi
- Leader: Michael Howard
- Preceded by: Theresa May
- Succeeded by: Francis Maude

Parliamentary Under-Secretary of State for Foreign and Commonwealth Affairs
- In office 23 July 1996 – 1 May 1997
- Prime Minister: John Major
- Preceded by: Mark Lennox-Boyd
- Succeeded by: The Baroness Symons

Lord Commissioner of the Treasury
- In office 28 November 1995 – 23 July 1996
- Prime Minister: John Major
- Preceded by: David Willetts
- Succeeded by: Patrick McLoughlin
Shadow cabinet posts
Shadow Secretary of State for Defence
In office 6 December 2005 – 11 May 2010
Leader	David Cameron
Preceded by	Michael Ancram
Succeeded by	Bob Ainsworth
Shadow Foreign Secretary
In office 10 May 2005 – 6 December 2005
Leader	Michael Howard
Preceded by	Michael Ancram
Succeeded by	William Hague
Shadow Secretary of State for Health
In office 15 June 1999 – 6 November 2003
Leader	William Hague; Iain Duncan Smith
Preceded by	Ann Widdecombe
Succeeded by	Tim Yeo
Shadow Constitutional Affairs Spokesperson
In office 1 June 1998 – 15 June 1999
Leader	William Hague
Preceded by	Michael Ancram
Succeeded by	George Young

Member of Parliament for North Somerset Woodspring (1992–2010)
- In office 9 April 1992 – 30 May 2024
- Preceded by: Sir Paul Dean
- Succeeded by: Sadik Al-Hassan

Personal details
- Born: 22 September 1961 (age 64) East Kilbride, Scotland
- Party: Conservative
- Spouse: Jesme Baird (m. 2005)
- Education: St Bride's High School, University of Glasgow (MB ChB)
- Occupation: Politician; doctor
- Website: Official website

Sir Liam Fox (born 22 September 1961) is a British politician who served as Secretary of State for International Trade from 2016 to 2019 and Secretary of State for Defence from 2010 to 2011. A member of the Conservative Party, he was the Member of Parliament (MP) for North Somerset, formerly Woodspring, from 1992 to 2024.

Fox studied medicine at the University of Glasgow and worked as a GP and civilian army medical GP before being elected as an MP. After holding several ministerial roles under John Major, Fox served as Constitutional Affairs Spokesman from 1998 to 1999, Shadow Health Secretary from 1999 to 2003, Chairman of the Conservative Party from 2003 to 2005, Shadow Foreign Secretary in 2005 and Shadow Defence Secretary from 2005 to 2010.

In the 2009 expenses scandal, he was the Shadow Cabinet minister found to have the largest over-claim on expenses and, as a result, was forced to repay the most money. In 2010, he was appointed Defence Secretary by Prime Minister David Cameron, a position from which he resigned on 14 October 2011 over allegations that he had given a close friend, lobbyist Adam Werritty, inappropriate access to the Ministry of Defence and allowed him to join official trips overseas.

In July 2016, in the wake of the United Kingdom's vote to leave the European Union, Fox was appointed the first Secretary of State for International Trade by new Prime Minister Theresa May. He was also made President of the Board of Trade. Fox has twice stood unsuccessfully for the leadership of the Conservative Party, in 2005 and 2016. In July 2019, he lost his cabinet position when new Prime Minister Boris Johnson appointed his cabinet.

He was knighted in the 2023 Political Honours for public and political service.

== Early life and education ==
Liam Fox was born and raised in a Roman Catholic family of Irish heritage in East Kilbride, Scotland, and brought up in a council house that his parents later bought. His great-uncle, John Fox, was the Labour Provost of Motherwell, with most of his family being Labour supporters.

Along with his brother and two sisters, he was educated in the state sector, attending St Bride's High School (now part of St Andrew's and St Bride's High School) in East Kilbride. He then studied medicine at the University of Glasgow, graduating with a MB ChB in 1983. Fox is a former general practitioner (he was a GP in Beaconsfield, Buckinghamshire, before his election to Parliament), a former Civilian Army General Practitioner and Divisional Surgeon with St John Ambulance.

== Parliamentary career ==
At the 1987 general election, Fox stood as the Conservative Party candidate in Roxburgh and Berwickshire, coming second, with 37.2% of the vote, behind the Liberal Party candidate, Archy Kirkwood.

Fox was first elected to Parliament as MP for Woodspring at the 1992 general election with 54.5% of the vote and a majority of 17,509.

In June 1993, Fox was appointed Parliamentary private secretary to the Home Secretary, Michael Howard. Thereafter, in July 1994, he was appointed an Assistant Government Whip. Following a limited government reshuffle in November 1995, he was appointed a Lord Commissioner of Treasury – a Senior Government Whip. He was Parliamentary under-secretary of state at the Foreign and Commonwealth Office from 1996 to 1997.

In 1996, he brokered an accord in Sri Lanka, called the Fox Peace Plan, between Chandrika Kumaratunga's PA and the opposition UNP of Ranil Wickremasinghe, on a bipartisan approach for ending the ethnic war. In 2001, Jonathan Goodhand wrote, "However, little has happened since then to suggest that the various parties would have acted in good faith in the interests of peace."

Fox was re-elected as MP for Woodspring at the 1997 general election with a decreased vote share of 44.4% and a decreased majority of 7,734.

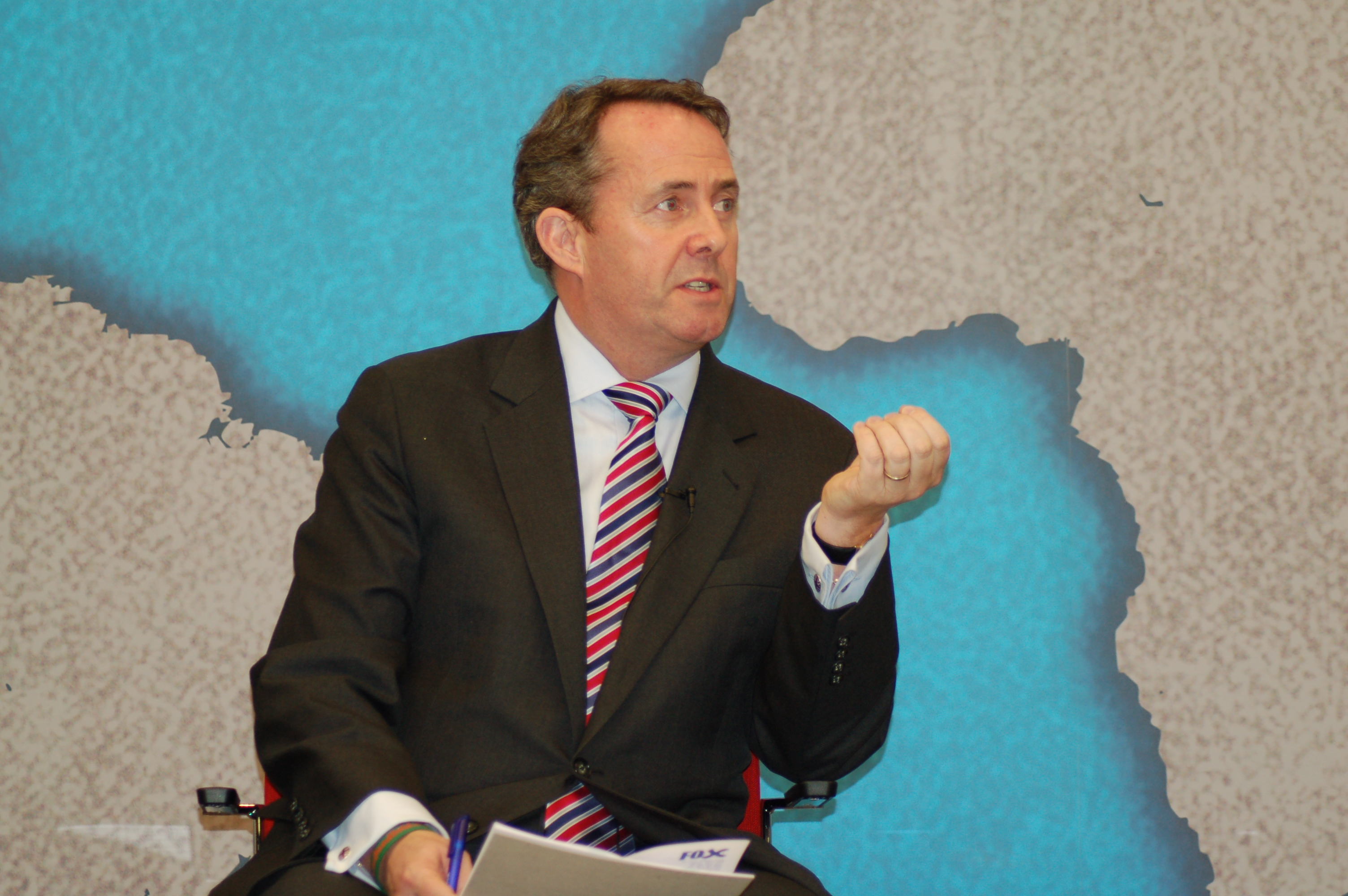
Liam Fox as Shadow Defence Secretary

In June 1997, Fox was appointed Opposition Front Bench Spokesman on Constitutional Affairs and joined the Shadow Cabinet in 1998 as the principal spokesman for Constitutional Affairs. Between 1999 and 2003, he was the Shadow Secretary of State for Health.

Fox caused controversy in December 2000, when a joke he had told at a Westminster Christmas party, hosted by Shadow Foreign Secretary Francis Maude, was reported in The Guardian's Diary column. According to the newspaper, Fox had asked a group, which included journalists, whether they had heard his new joke, before continuing: "What do you call three dogs and a blackbird?" No-one knew the answer, and Fox proceeded to finish the joke: "The Spice Girls". He then repeated it. BBC News Online wrote that the joke "could be interpreted as sexist and racist", and reported that Fox admitted telling it. He was told to apologise by the office of party leader William Hague. Fox said in a statement: "In repeating a widely-circulated joke, I very much regret if anyone was offended. I naturally apologise if any offence was caused." Labour MP Denis MacShane told BBC News Online: "Liam Fox's covert and now open racism is an embarrassment to the Tories. William Hague should have sacked him in the summer after he said foreign doctors should sit language tests. Now he makes a racist joke about Mel B and insults every black and Asian creative artist in show business." A spokeswoman for the Spice Girls commented: "One thing is for sure, no one has ever heard of Liam Fox so no one would bother making offensive jokes about him."

At the 2001 general election, Fox was again re-elected, with a decreased vote share of 43.7% and an increased majority of 8,798.

In November 2003, Fox was appointed campaign manager for Michael Howard following the no-confidence vote against the Conservative's party leader, Iain Duncan Smith. Fox became co-chairman of the party following Michael Howard's elevation to the post of party leader in November 2003.

Fox voted for the 2003 invasion of Iraq. As Shadow Defence Secretary he supported the Government's position of maintaining British troops in Iraq until the security situation allowed for a withdrawal of troops but was critical of the lack of post-invasion planning and poor equipment initially provided to British troops. He supported the idea of the American Surgel, believing that it was successful, and visited Iraq several times as Shadow Defence Secretary.

Fox was again re-elected at the 2005 general election, with a decreased vote share of 41.8% and a decreased majority of 6,016. Following the general election he was promoted within the Shadow Cabinet to become Shadow Foreign Secretary.

In September 2005, Fox announced he would join the contest to be the next leader of the Conservative party. His campaign theme for the leadership race was based on the "broken society" theme, which he said Conservatives could address by returning the emphasis to marriage and reforming welfare. In the initial ballot of Conservative MPs, on 18 October 2005, he gained enough support (42 votes) to enter the second ballot two days later. He was eliminated in the second ballot with 51 votes in third place behind David Cameron (90 votes) and David Davis (57 votes). Cameron, who eventually won the leadership election, gave Fox the role of Shadow Defence Secretary.

In February 2008, Fox spoke in the House of Commons in opposition to the defence provisions in the Lisbon Treaty.

Fox has been an outspoken supporter of the war in Afghanistan and the British presence there. In 2009, he was critical towards some NATO partners for not contributing enough to the effort in the more dangerous southern and eastern parts of Afghanistan.

Prior to the 2010 general election, Fox's constituency of Woodspring was abolished, and replaced with North Somerset. At the general election, Fox was elected as MP for North Somerset with 49.3% of the vote and a majority of 7,862.

On 5 February 2013, Fox voted against a second reading of the Marriage (Same Sex Couples) Bill, designed to introduce same-sex marriage in the United Kingdom. He described David Cameron's plans to legalise same-sex marriage as "divisive, ill thought through and constitutionally wrong", arguing that redefining marriage for the majority to satisfy a "small, yet vocal, minority" was not a good basis for a stable, tolerant society.

Fox was re-elected as MP for North Somerset at the 2015 general election with an increased vote share of 53.5% and an increased majority of 23,099.

In late June 2016, Fox announced on LBC that he intended to run for the leadership of the Conservative party once again, after David Cameron resigned following the result of the EU referendum, in which Fox supported leaving the EU. During the announcement of his candidacy, he said that the UK should trigger Article 50 by the end of 2016 so it could leave the EU by 2019, specifying 1 January 2019 as the date on which the UK should leave. He stated that he would not allow freedom of movement to be considered as part of any alternative trade arrangement with the EU. Fox promised to increase defence spending, stating that he would particularly like to see "an increase in the size of the Navy and our cyber capability". He also promised to scrap HS2, spending the £55 billion set aside for the project on regional train lines, cut taxes, cut welfare spending, create a new governmental department for "trade and foreign affairs" and review the aid budget. Fox was eliminated in the first ballot, finishing in last place with 16 votes. Theresa May went on to win the leadership and become Prime Minister and gave Fox the job of Secretary of State for International Trade.

At the snap 2017 general election, Fox was again re-elected, with an increased vote share of 54.2% and a decreased majority of 17,103. He was again re-elected at the 2019 general election, with a decreased vote share of 52.9% and an increased majority of 17,536.

On 8 July 2020, the UK government nominated Fox as a candidate for Director-General of the World Trade Organisation. Fox's main rival for the nomination, the Labour peer Peter Mandelson, was overlooked due to his opposition to Brexit. Fox progressed to the second round of the selection process. He did not become one of the two candidates to enter the final round, who were South Korea's Yoo Myung-hee and Nigeria's Ngozi Okonjo-Iweala, and was knocked out on 7 October.

In 2021 Fox was the sponsor of a Down Syndrome Bill, an Act to "make provision about meeting the needs of persons with Down syndrome."

In the 2024 general election Fox was defeated by the Labour candidate, Sadik Al-Hassan.

== Secretary of State for Defence ==
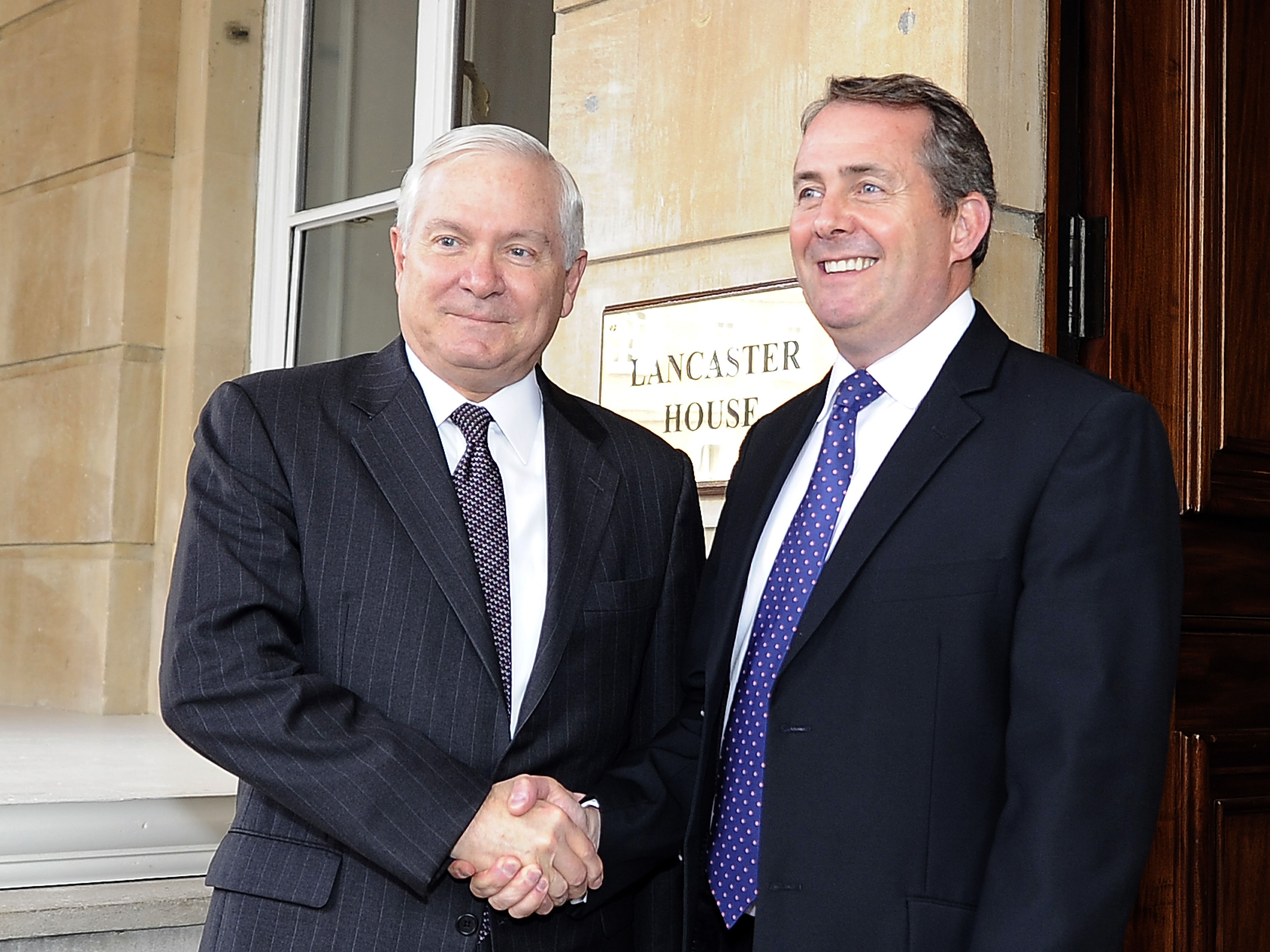
Fox with US Defense Secretary Robert Gates in 2010

Fox was appointed as Secretary of State for Defence in the cabinet of David Cameron on 12 May 2010.

In July 2010, he said that the dire state of the public finances meant the Armed Forces could no longer be equipped to cover every conceivable danger. He said that the strongest signal that it will have to give up one or more of these capabilities, which have been maintained at the same time as contributing to collective security pacts such as NATO. "We don't have the money as a country to protect ourselves against every potential future threat," he said. "We have to look at where we think the real risks will come from, where the real threats will come from and we need to deal with that accordingly. The Russians are not going to come over the European plain any day soon," he added. Fox's admission cast doubt on the future of the 25,000 troops currently stationed in Germany. The Defence Secretary had previously said that he hoped to withdraw them at some point, leaving Britain without a presence in the country for the first time since 1945.

The Ministry of Defence (MoD) faced budget cuts of up to 8% over the next five years, according to some analysts, and the department was grappling with a £37 billion shortfall on programmes it has signed up to. The results of the Strategic Defence and Security Review (SDSR) were published on 19 October 2010. Speaking in September 2010 at a meeting in Paris with his French counterpart Hervé Morin on the possibility of sharing aircraft carriers with the French Navy, Fox said, "I think it is unrealistic to share an aircraft carrier but, in other areas like tactical lift we can see what we can do." He added: "I can't deny that there is an element of urgency added by budget concerns."

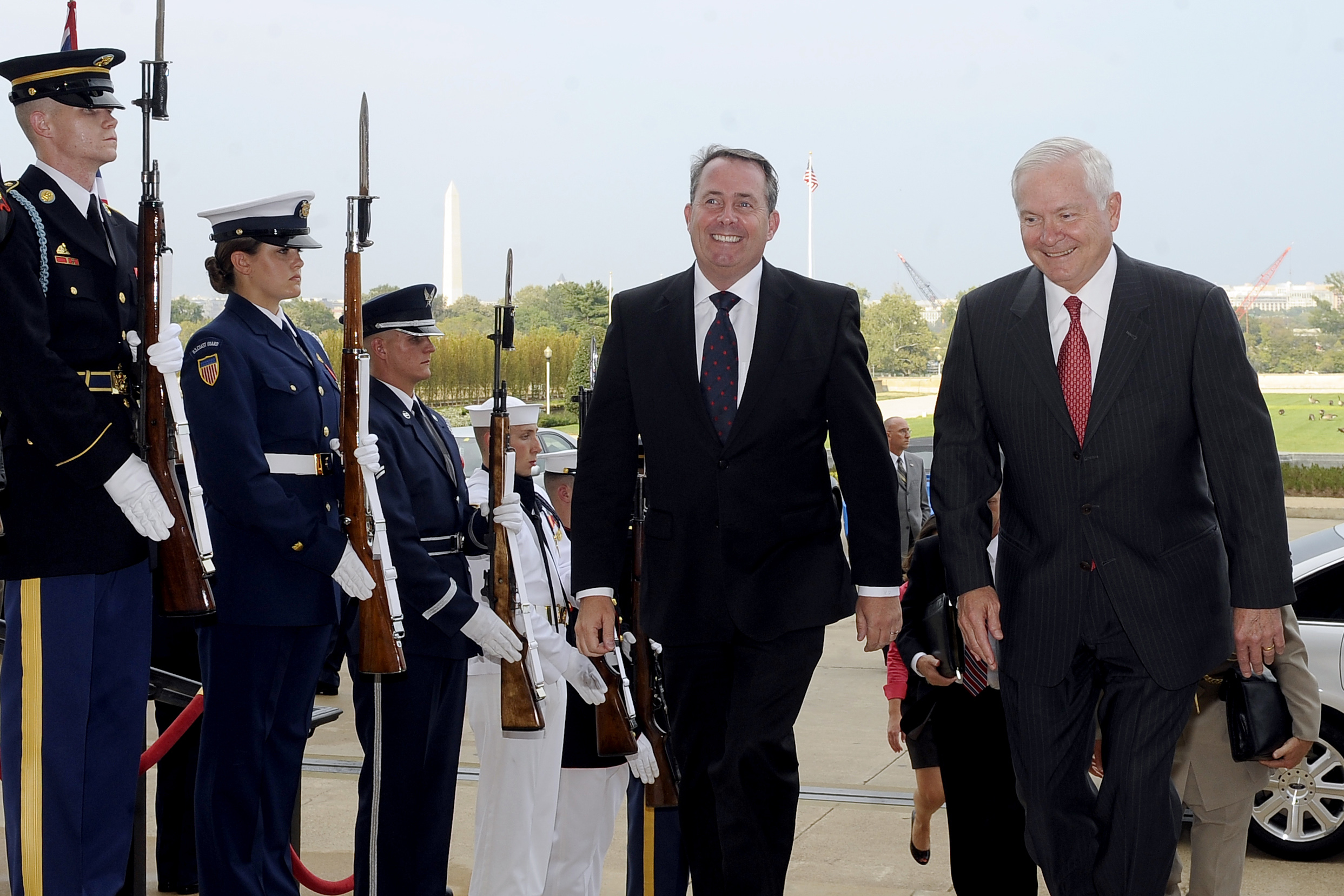
Secretary of Defense Robert M. Gates escorts Fox through an honor cordon and into The Pentagon in 2010

In September 2010, in a private letter to David Cameron, Fox refused to back any "draconian cuts" in the Armed Forces at a time when Britain was at war. The letter was written the night before a National Security Council (NSC) meeting on the Strategic Defence and Security Review (SDSR). In the letter, Fox wrote that: "Frankly this process is looking less and less defensible as a proper SDSR (Strategic Defence and Strategy Review) and more like a 'super CSR' (Comprehensive Spending Review). If it continues on its current trajectory it is likely to have grave political consequences for us". Fox continued saying that "Our decisions today will limit severely the options available to this and all future governments. The range of operations that we can do today we will simply not be able to do in the future. In particular, it would place at risk."

In February 2011, Fox criticised "ballooning" spending in his own department. The top 15 major procurement projects were running at £8.8 billion over budget and, between them, were delayed by a total of 32 years. That included the A400M transporter aircraft order that was £603 million over budget and six years behind schedule. Fox criticised what he called a "conspiracy of optimism based on poor cost-estimation, unrealistic timescales" at the MoD and in industry. "These practices in the MOD would simply not be tolerated in the private sector, and they will no longer be tolerated in the MoD."

In March 2011, Fox defended the decision to make 11,000 redundancies in the armed forces, insisting that personnel who have recently returned from Afghanistan would not be sacked. Cameron had conceded that axing around 5,000 personnel from the army, 3,300 from the Navy and 2,700 from the RAF will be difficult for those affected. Strategic Defence and Security Review (SDSR) set out plans for reducing the size of the armed forces by 17,000 in total. Some of that number would be met by not replacing people who were retiring or leaving for other reasons. Defence officials said 11,000 personnel still faced being redundant on a compulsory or voluntary basis. Fox said it was essential that service personnel were made "fully aware of the options available and the time-scales involved". "That means that a timetable needs to be adhered to for the sake of themselves and their families," he said. "It would simply be wrong to alter that timetable for the convenience of the Government."

In light of the 2011 Libyan civil war, Fox warned that Libya could end up split in two as Muammar Gaddafi unleashed the full fury of his military arsenal, sending warplanes and ground troops to attack rebel-held positions across the country. "We could see the Gaddafi forces centred around Tripoli," Fox said. "We could see a de facto partition of the country."

In May 2011, Fox opposed plans to sharply increase Britain's aid budget, in a direct challenge to David Cameron's authority. In a leaked letter to the Prime Minister, Fox said he could not accept plans to increase the development budget to 0.7 percent of the gross domestic product. The aid pledge, made in the Conservative election manifesto last year, was at the heart of Cameron's attempts to change his party's image. It has gained opponents among right-wing Tories, many of whom voted for Fox when he fought Cameron for the party leadership in 2005. "I cannot support the proposal in its current form," Fox told the Prime Minister. Fox suggested that development funding should be diverted to the defence budget, writing that reneging on the aid pledge would release more public money to be spent on "other activities or programmes rather than aid". The Telegraph's James Kirkup said the leak was increasing suspicion among Cameron's allies that the Defence Secretary was trying to undermine the Prime Minister.

Following negative comments by Sir Simon Bryant and Sir Mark Stanhope, Secretary Fox said admirals and air marshals who have voiced concerns were giving strength to Muammar Gaddafi's regime. He also warned that high-ranking members of the Armed Forces were facing the sack because the Government wanted to reduce bureaucracy by cutting "the star count". The Daily Telegraph had learned that the redundancies would include up 500 starred officers, equivalent to the rank of an Army brigadier and above. Fox said: "We must be very careful, those of us who have authority in defence, when discussing the sustainability of a mission. People's lives are at stake and there can only be one message that goes out on Libya." Admiral Sir John "Sandy" Woodward, a former deputy chief of the defence staff, suggested Fox was trying to blame military chiefs for "his own failings". He said: "Of course the service chiefs should not be talking outside the MoD, but when politicians have got it so wrong they have no other choice."

=== Levene report ===
On 27 June 2011, Fox announced that Baron Levene had completed his report on the reform of the MoD which suggested that they could cut the number of senior officers and could also lead to ministerial posts being axed. The army, navy and air force would each be run by a single chief. Currently, the services have two commanders, one in charge of strategy, the second in charge of day-to-day operations. The reforms would see operational control pushed down the chain of command. In addition, the three service chiefs will be removed from the defence board, a powerful committee the defence secretary chairs. The overall head of the military, the chief of the defence staff, currently, General Sir David Richards, will represent them. A committee chaired by an independent non-executive director, chosen by the defence secretary, will be in charge of appointments to the services' top ranks. The MoD is expected to axe up to 8,000 civil servants in 2012. Senior commanders would be given more overall control of their budgets and internal appointments.

The report also suggested that a new Joint Forces Command structure should be created with senior appointments in the MoD lasting longer than every two years by making sure people stay in post for longer. Levene said that "finance and the need for affordability are not regarded as sufficiently important throughout the organisation." He said that the "lack of trust" which pervades the MoD has led to a tendency for those at the top to try to micromanage, while the individual services look out for themselves rather than thinking of defence as a whole. This has led to a "predisposition to overcomplicate ... and a culture of reinventing the wheel". The role of the chief of the defence staff should also be enhanced so that "he alone will be responsible for representing the military voice." Levene says that the new defence board "should be the primary decision-making body for non-operational matters", and should meet 10 times a year. It will have nine members, but only one will be from the military, the chief of the defence staff, currently General Sir David Richards.

=== Defence and Security Review ===
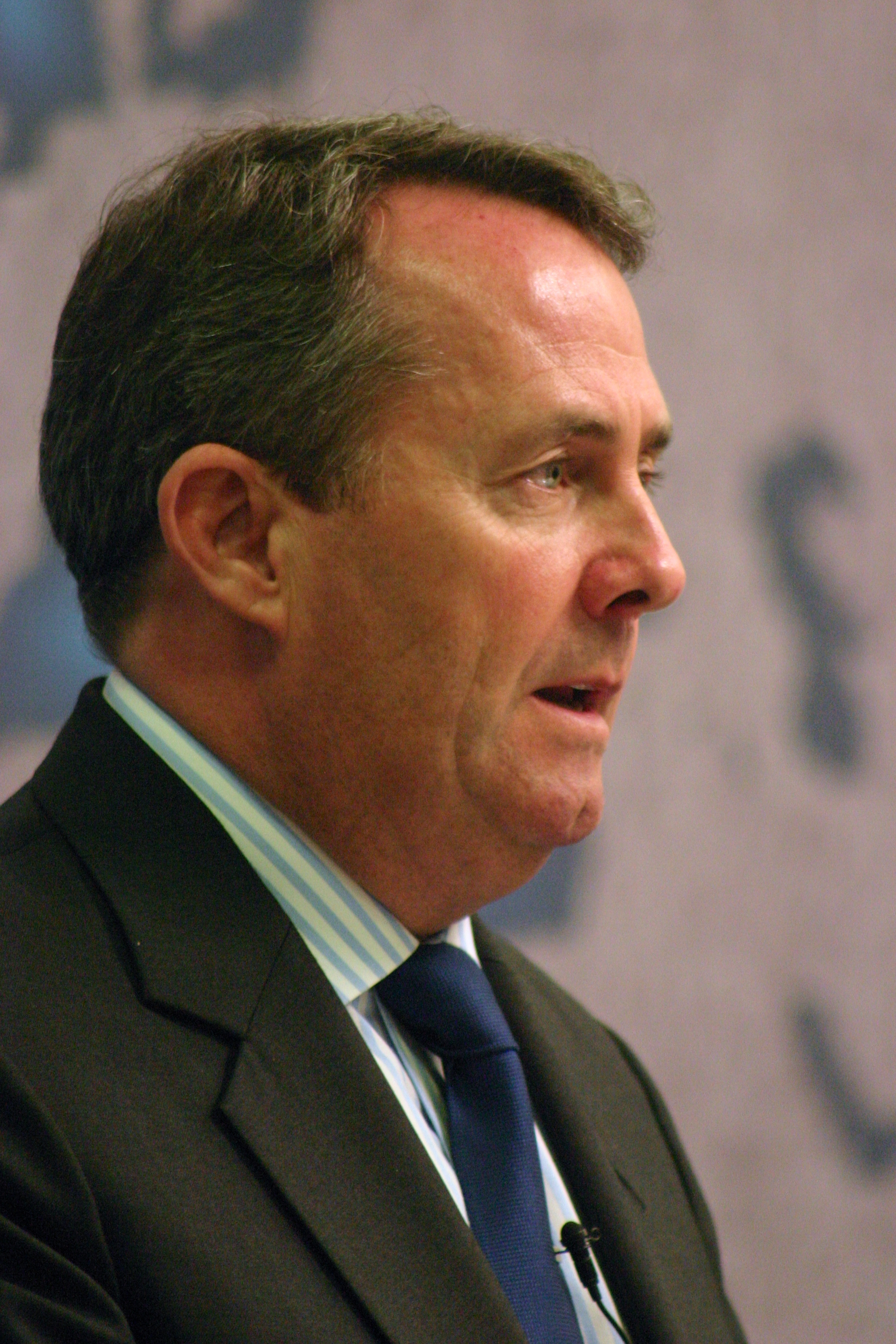
Liam Fox at Chatham House in 2010

In a speech on the future of the Armed Forces to the House of Commons on 19 October 2010 Prime Minister David Cameron set out plans that would mean cuts: 7,000 jobs go in the British Army; 5,000 in the Royal Navy; 5,000 in the Royal Air Force; and 25,000 civilian jobs at the Ministry of Defence. In terms of equipment, the RAF would lose the Nimrod reconnaissance aircraft programme, the entire Harrier fleet would be scrapped, and bases will be turned over to the Army. The Army will have its tanks and heavy artillery cut by 40%, and half of the soldiers in Germany will return to the UK by 2015, with the rest brought home by 2030 and housed in former RAF bases. The Navy would have its destroyer and frigate fleet cut from 23 to 19 (by cutting the Type 22 frigates) and will be provided with less expensive frigates. It will be affected by the loss of the Harriers. Overall, the defence budget was to be cut by 8% but Cameron insisted that Britain would continue to meet the NATO target of spending 2% of GDP on defence.

In the same speech Cameron announced a national cyber security programme, costing £500 million, "to fix shortfalls in cyber infrastructure", while more focus will be given to tackling terrorists such as Al Qaeda and dissident Irish republicans in what he said would be "continuing investment in our world class intelligence agencies". Army numbers will fall to 95,500 by 2015 – 7,000 fewer than today – but ground forces will continue to have vital operational role in the future, he said.

=== Resignation ===
It was revealed that Fox's close friend, best man and former business partner Adam Werritty had made visits to Fox at the Ministry of Defence (MoD) in Whitehall on 22 occasions in 16 months; Werritty was not security-cleared with the MoD. Additionally, over a 17-month period, ending October 2011, Werritty was present at 40 of Fox's 70 recorded engagements. The uncertain nature of Werritty's relationship with Fox led to an investigation by senior civil servants, initially the MoD's Permanent Secretary, Ursula Brennan and latterly the Cabinet Secretary Sir Gus O'Donnell. Fox said that Werrity had never worked for him either in an official or unofficial capacity despite allegations that Fox was using a source of advice outside the Civil Service, paid for by private funds, allegedly a private intelligence firm. Disclosure of increasing amounts of detail of their contact, funding and explanations of their relationship led to Fox's resignation on 14 October 2011 in advance of O'Donnell's report of his investigation into Fox breaking the Ministerial code by letting his friend Adam Werritty into defence meetings.

The Cabinet Secretary's investigation into the incident concluded that Fox's conduct constituted a "clear breach of the Ministerial code" and that his actions posed a "security risk".

== Secretary of State for International Trade ==
After Theresa May became Prime Minister of the United Kingdom in July 2016, Fox was appointed Secretary of State for International Trade, responsible for helping to secure trade deals with other countries following Brexit.

The Wall Street Journal reported Fox as saying he would prefer a free trade agreement with the EU rather than be part of the European Union Customs Union, which he said could restrict Britain's ability to negotiate lower tariffs with other trading partners.

In a September 2016 speech on international trade, Fox said there needed to be a change in British business culture, arguing that exporting was a "duty" which companies neglected because "it might be too difficult or too time-consuming or because they can't play golf on a Friday afternoon". In April 2017, he was criticised for a trade visit to the Philippines, where he acknowledged "shared values" when speaking to Philippines President Rodrigo Duterte, heavily criticised for the increase in extrajudicial killings in the Philippines.

In 2017, Fox announced a new Board of Trade which would meet four times a year to "ensure the benefits of free trade are spread throughout the UK." The announcement was criticised by Liberal Democrat MP Tom Brake, who said the board was a "job-creation scheme" for Fox. A DIT spokesman said it was a "technicality" that Fox was the sole member of the board, because of a constitutional convention that full membership is only for privy counsellors. In July 2019, he lost his cabinet position when new Prime Minister Boris Johnson made a cabinet reshuffle.

== Political positions ==
=== Finances ===
Fox was a registered shareholder of the medical educational firm Arrest Ltd, which was dissolved in 2010.

Fox accepted a £50,000 donation from Jon Moulton, whose investment firm, Better Capital, later went on to own Gardner Aerospace, an aerospace metallic manufactured details supplier which includes component parts for both military and civilian aircraft. This potentially exposed Fox to conflict of interest but neither Fox nor Moulton violated any rules with this donation.

In 2023 the Good Law Project revealed that Fox had personally received a £10,000 cash donation in January 2023 by Aquind, a British cabling company controlled by Russian oil tycoon Viktor Fedotov, further fuelling ongoing investigation into Tory funds given by Russian donors.

=== Bahrain ===
In March 2013, Fox was one of the chief guests at a conference in Bahrain designed to rally Western opinion to the side of the Bahraini government in its struggle against the Arab Spring.

Liam Fox in Basra, Iraq September 2008

In August 2014, Fox argued that the UK should start bombing Islamist extremists in northern Iraq. The following month this became government policy.

=== Brexit ===
Fox supported Brexit at the EU Referendum 2016, and is a self-proclaimed "staunch Eurosceptic". Following this assertion, he stated that he wants a "clean break" from Brussels, in order to regain "national sovereignty". In July 2019 he acknowledged that no deal could lead to the breakup of the United Kingdom.

In March 2018, Fox said that he would "no longer support" an extension to the EU transition period. He had previously said that a post-Brexit trade deal "should be the easiest in human history". By July 2019 he recognised that a deal with the US would "take time" and that despite reaching "above 99% of agreement" on a deal based on Canada's existing deal with the EU, the Canadians were now looking at the zero-tariff access being promised in the event of no deal.

On 30 November 2018, he came out in support for Theresa May's Brexit deal, calling it the best possible deal that safely delivers Brexit.

=== Afghanistan ===
In July 2010, Fox said that an early withdrawal of coalition troops from Afghanistan would risk a return of civil war and act as a "shot in the arm to jihadists" across the world. In marked contrast to David Cameron, who pledged to withdraw all British troops by 2015, Fox said Britain would be betraying the sacrifices of its fallen soldiers if it left "before the job is finished". British forces would be among the last to leave Afghanistan, he added, because they are stationed in Helmand, one of the most dangerous provinces in the country. He said that "Were we to leave prematurely, without degrading the insurgency and increasing the capability of the Afghan national security forces, we could see the return of the destructive forces of transnational terror ... Not only would we risk the return of civil war in Afghanistan, creating a security vacuum, but we would also risk the destabilisation of Pakistan with potentially unthinkable regional, and possibly nuclear, consequences."

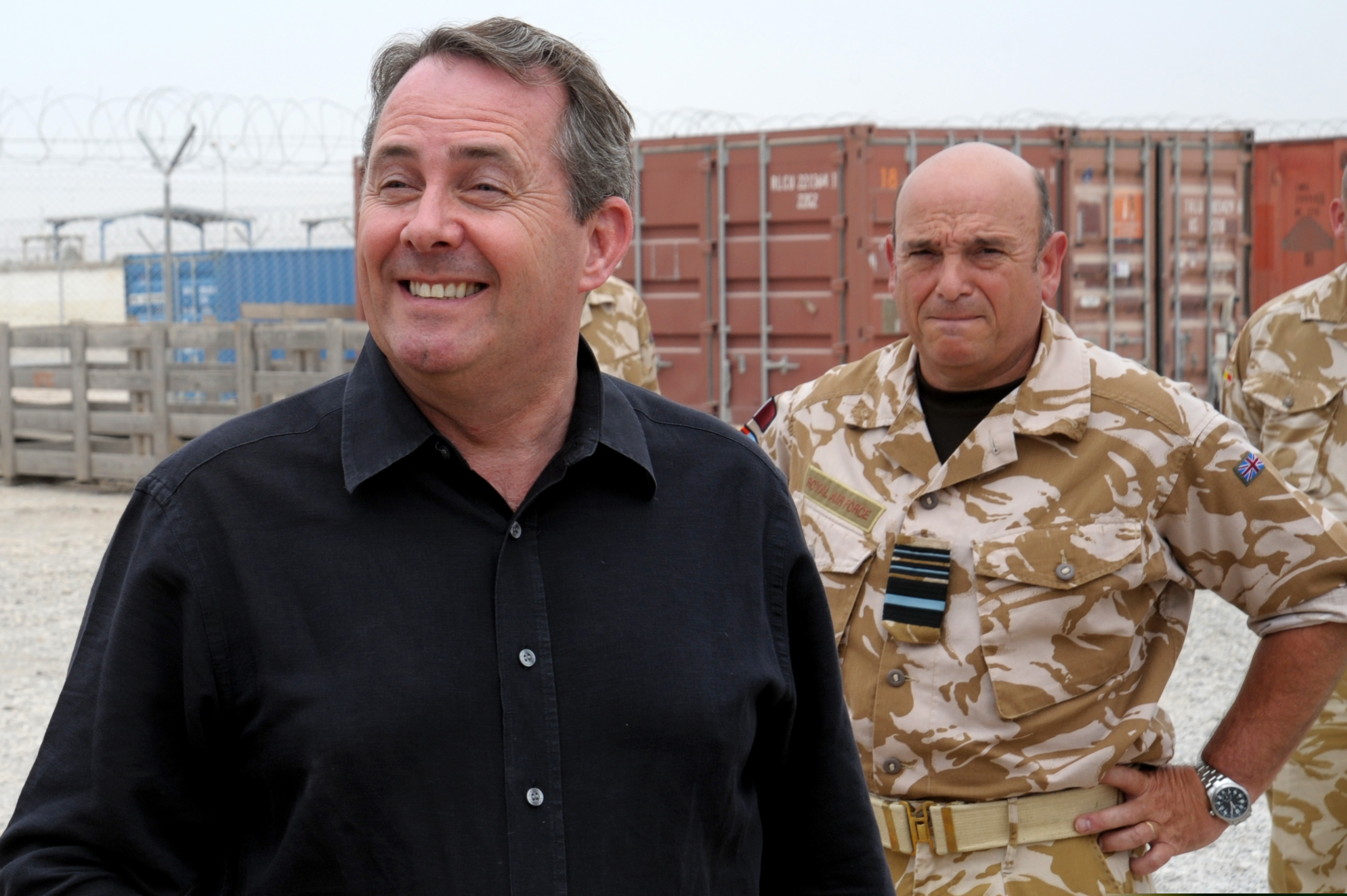
Liam Fox in Afghanistan with Air Marshal Stuart Peach in 2010

In July 2010, it was reported that 1,000 Royal Marines were expected to leave and be redeployed to central Helmand by the end of 2010. Fox told MPs that UK forces had made "good progress" in Sangin, but the move would enable Britain to provide "more manpower and greater focus" on Helmand's busy central belt, leaving the north and south to the US. "The result will be a coherent and equitable division of the main populated areas of Helmand between three brigade-sized forces, with the US in the north and the south, and the UK-led Task Force Helmand, alongside our outstanding Danish and Estonian allies, in the central population belt," he told the House of Commons.

On 19 July 2010, Fox said that within four years the Afghan army and police should take responsibility for security, leaving British troops to work only as military trainers. The date is a full year earlier than the deadline suggested by David Cameron this month, who said he wanted most troops back by 2015. Fox said: "It has always been our aim to be successful in the mission and the mission has always said that the Afghan national security forces would be able to deal with their own security by 2014. We recognise that there will be further work to do in terms of training and improving the quality of those forces beyond that, which is why we have said training forces may be available after that date. But we have made it very clear that that will not be combat forces."

=== NATO ===
Liam Fox meeting with General McChrystal in Kabul, Afghanistan in July 2009

He has very strong Atlanticist views. He believes that NATO is the cornerstone of the United Kingdom and Europe's defence and that NATO must have primacy over the European Union including the right of first refusal for all matters relating to the defence of continental Europe. He has been critical of the common funding mechanism within NATO and has called for a system to be used that allows for more proportionate burden sharing between NATO member states for NATO led military operations.

=== European Union ===
He is considered to be staunchly Eurosceptic and opposed to European defence integration as well as European political integration. He is opposed to the European Commission having any role in defence policy. He believes that the European Security and Defence Policy duplicates and takes away scarce national resources from NATO.

=== Abortion ===
Fox is critical of abortion and has called for "huge restriction, if not abolition" on the UK's "pro-abortion laws". In an interview with Morgan and Platell, Fox elaborated on these views, stating that he would "like to see [abortion limits] brought down...well below 20 weeks; I'd like to see us look at limits more akin to some of the European countries at 12 or 14 weeks."

He went on to state that "a society that actually aborts 180,000 unborn children every year is a society that needs to be asking a lot of questions about itself. For me, it's a simple personal belief. It says, "thou shall not kill", it doesn't say, thou shall not kill unless Parliament says it's OK. For the same reason I'm against the death penalty. However, I do accept...that if the majority of the population decide that it's something they find acceptable, I've got to live with that. But I'm not going to be quiet and I'm not going to pretend that my views are other than they are for the sake of political convenience."

=== Military welfare ===
Fox has stated on a number of occasions that the Military Covenant is broken and that the British Armed Forces are being asked to do too much for what they are resourced to do.

Along with the leader of the Conservative Party, David Cameron, he established the Military Covenant Commission headed by Frederick Forsyth with the aim of finding ways to improve the welfare of service members, veterans, and their families under a future Conservative Government. Fox has a particular interest in mental health issues and has criticised Gordon Brown's Labour Government for failing to adequately address the problem.

=== Israel ===
Fox is a supporter of Israel, and is a member of Conservative Friends of Israel. In 2006 he said, "Israel's enemies are our enemies and this is a battle in which we all stand together or we will all fall divided." The Jewish Chronicle called Fox a "champion of Israel" while he was in government. In January 2009, referring to Israel, he said, "British support for any ally is never unqualified. International law and values must always be obeyed." In May 2011, Fox was booed at a We Believe in Israel event for saying that Israeli settlements "are illegal and an obstacle to peace".

=== US–UK relations ===
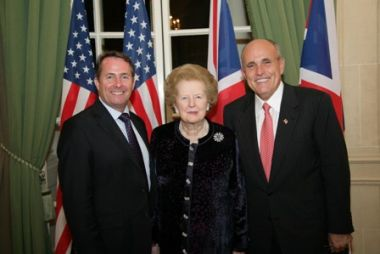
Liam Fox with Rudy Giuliani and Margaret Thatcher in 2007

He is a strong believer in the Special Relationship between the United Kingdom and the United States. He was the UK Director and founding member of The Atlantic Bridge, a UK-based charity that aims to preserve and promote the Special Relationship. The Atlantic Bridge closed down in October 2011 after being told to cease activities by the Charity Commission for "promoting a political policy [that] is closely associated with the Conservative Party".

Fox was able to retain a good relationship with the administration of George W. Bush, despite a five-year breakdown in relations between the Conservative and Republican parties over the Iraq War. He led the Conservative delegation to the 2008 Republican National Convention. In 2018, he commented that the 25% tariffs imposed by the United States on imported EU steel were "patently absurd."

Fox criticised protesters against Donald Trump's visit to the UK in 2018, calling them a "embarrassment to themselves".

=== Freedom of the press ===
In October 2013, Fox called for The Guardian newspaper to face prosecution over the 2013 mass surveillance disclosures.

In January 2015, Fox published a video on YouTube detailing his opinions and criticism of Edward Snowden. He stated: "We're constantly having to protect our society from a range of threats, especially organised crime, paedophilia, and terrorism. For our intelligence services to operate effectively, and to protect us from these threats, they need to be able to do things in secret, secrets whose public disclosure would be damaging to our National Interest. When Edward Snowden stole files and took them with him to China and then Russia, some 58,000 files came from GCHQ, information that had played a vital role in preventing terrorist outrages in Britain, over the past decade and longer. It was not freedom fighting. We should call treason by its name. And those who assisted Snowden must be held responsible for their actions."

=== National Health Service ===
In January 2014, Fox stated that ring-fenced funding for the NHS should end, stating: "The increase [in spending] over the last decade has been phenomenal and yet a lot of our health indicators lag behind other countries, particular things like stroke outcome or a lot of cancer outcomes."

=== Syria ===
Fox was disappointed that Parliament voted not to take military action over the use of chemical weapons in Syria. Fox was critical of Cameron's strategy and performance for that debate, and stated "There was no need to seek parliamentary approval for any military action, as constitutional authority lies with the government." He later took the view that there were no easy answers to the Syrian civil war and the prospect of the Assad government surviving should be considered. Fox argued that bombing attacks against ISIL in Iraq should be extended into Syria, and safe havens should be created in Syria by military intervention.

=== Western Sahara ===
In January 2024, Fox publicly expressed his support for Morocco and its Western Sahara Autonomy Proposal in the Western Sahara conflict, and called on the government to officially recognise Morocco's claim to the territory, as the United States had done in 2020 in exchange for the Israel–Morocco normalization agreement.

He also went further and made unsubstantiated claims on supposed alliances of the Polisario.

=== Expenses ===
In March 2010, Fox appealed Sir Thomas Legg's decision that he had overclaimed £22,476 in mortgage interest payments. Fox immediately repaid the money, then appealed the decision. Fox's appeal was rejected and the decision was upheld by Sir Paul Kennedy, a former high court judge. Fox stated that his decision to remortgage his second home to pay for redecorations and claim the higher interest repayments on his expenses represented value for money because he could have charged the taxpayer for the decorating bills directly. In his response, Sir Paul Kennedy stated: "What you claimed was not recoverable under the rules then in force. I entirely accept that, like many others, you could have made other claims if the fees office had rejected your claims for mortgage interest, and that you may well have spent some of what you raised by increasing your mortgage on your constituency home, but the evidence is imprecise, and my terms of reference only allow me to interfere if I find special reasons in your individual case showing that it would not be fair and equitable to require repayment, either at all or at the level recommended." This reportedly made him the Conservative Shadow Cabinet member with the largest over-claim on expenses, and as a result, he has been forced to repay the most money.

It was reported in June 2009 that Fox claimed expenses of more than £19,000 over the previous four years for his mobile phone. Fox stated that the high bill was due to regular trips overseas, in his capacity as Shadow Defence Secretary and said he was looking for a cheaper tariff.

In October 2012, the Commons Speaker blocked the release of data showing which MPs were renting their homes to other MPs for financial gain. However, a study of parliamentary records was published in the Daily Telegraph. The study showed that Liam Fox receives rental income from his London home while simultaneously claiming rental income from the taxpayer to live at another residence.

In October 2013, documents showed that Fox claimed 3p for a 100 metre car trip a year earlier. He also made an additional 15 claims under £1 for car travel approved in 2012–13, two of which were for 24p and 44p. He told the Sunday People: "I don't do my expenses. My office does them. But they are all done according to the rules for travel distances."

=== Breaches of parliamentary rules ===
In March 2010, Fox admitted breaking parliamentary rules on two occasions by visiting Sri Lanka on a trip paid for by the Government of Sri Lanka without declaring the trip in the Register of Members' Financial Interests in the required time of 30 days and failing to declare an interest in Sri Lanka when asking ministers how much UK aid had been given to Sri Lanka. Fox has declared all of his trips to Sri Lanka paid for by the Sri Lankan government in the Register of Members' Financial Interests. One trip he took in November 2007 was declared two months late. Fox blamed a "changeover of staffing responsibilities" for this error. Of the five trips to Sri Lanka mentioned in the BBC article, three were paid for fully by the Sri Lankan government. Those not paid in full by the Sri Lankan government were paid for by the Sri Lankan Development Trust.

Fox stated that he had been working for 'all sides of the ethnic divide': "I have been involved in attempts to promote peace and reconciliation in Sri Lanka, involving all sides of the ethnic divide, since I was a foreign minister in 1997. During my most recent visit, I spoke at a press conference to outline my reasons for being there. The declaration of the visit you refer to in November 2007 was highlighted in an end-of-year audit following a changeover of staffing responsibilities. The registrar was immediately notified and my register entry was updated accordingly. All visits have been fully declared on the House of Commons Register of Members' Interests and are therefore public knowledge and entirely legitimate. I do, however, recognise that when asking one question in 2008, I should have noted an interest and will be writing to the registrar to make this clear".

== Post-parliamentary career ==
Following his defeat at the 2024 general election, Fox was appointed as Chair of the UK Abraham Accords Group.

== Personal life ==
On 10 June 2005, he announced his engagement to longtime girlfriend Jesme Baird, a doctor who works at the Roy Castle Lung Cancer Foundation. They married at St Margaret's Church opposite Parliament on 17 December 2005.

He previously dated Natalie Imbruglia and is credited in the liner notes of her 1997 album Left of the Middle.

He has lived in North Somerset since 1990, and currently resides in Tickenham.

In September 2013, Fox launched Rising Tides: Facing the Challenges of a New Era, a 384-page book in which he warns that many of the world's institutions are ill-equipped to tackle the economic and security threats of the 21st century.

Fox is a member of the Royal College of General Practitioners.

== See also ==
- G3 (company)

== Notes ==
a. Clark was appointed by the Privy Council in error for four days before the mistake was rectified, the holder prior to Clark was Sajid Javid.

Parliament of the United Kingdom
Preceded by Paul Dean	Member of Parliament for Woodspring; 1992–2010	Constituency abolished
New constituency	Member of Parliament for North Somerset; 2010–2024	Succeeded by Sadik Al-Hassan
Political offices
Preceded by Michael Ancram	Shadow Constitutional Affairs Spokesperson; 1998–1999	Succeeded by George Young
Preceded by Ann Widdecombe	Shadow Secretary of State for Health; 1999–2003	Succeeded by Tim Yeo
Preceded by Michael Ancram	Shadow Foreign Secretary; 2005	Succeeded by William Hague
Preceded by Michael Ancram	Shadow Secretary of State for Defence; 2005–2010	Succeeded by Bob Ainsworth
Preceded by Bob Ainsworth	Secretary of State for Defence; 2010–2011	Succeeded by Philip Hammond
New office	Secretary of State for International Trade; 2016–2019	Succeeded by Liz Truss
Preceded by Greg Clark	President of the Board of Trade; 2016–2019	Succeeded by Liz Truss
Party political offices
Preceded by Theresa May	Chairman of the Conservative Party; 2003–2005; Served alongside: The Lord Saatchi	Succeeded by Francis Maude
