= Woodspring (constituency) =

UK Parliament constituency (1983–2010)

Coordinates: 51°24′N 2°45′W

- Former county constituency for the House of Commons
- Boundary of Woodspring in Avon for the 2005 general election

- Location of Avon within England
- County: Somerset

1983–2010
- Seats: One
- Created from: North Somerset and Weston-super-Mare
- Replaced by: North Somerset

Woodspring was a constituency represented in the House of Commons of the Parliament of the United Kingdom from 1983 until 2010. It elected one Member of Parliament (MP) by the first past the post system of election. From 1992 until 2010, it was represented by Liam Fox, former Secretary of State for Defence. Fox went on to represent the new North Somerset constituency from 2010.

== Boundaries ==
1983–1997: The District of Woodspring wards of Backwell, Clevedon Central, Clevedon East, Clevedon North, Clevedon South, Clevedon Walton, Clevedon West, Easton-in-Gordano, Gordano, Long Ashton, Nailsea East, Nailsea North and West, North Weston, Portishead Central, Portishead Coast, Portishead South, Portishead West, Winford, and Wraxall, and the District of Wansdyke wards of Cameley, Chew Magna, Chew Stoke, Clutton, Compton Dando, Farmborough, Harptrees, High Littleton, Paulton, Publow, Stowey Sutton, and Timsbury.

1997–2010: The District of North Somerset wards of Backwell, Clevedon Central, Clevedon East, Clevedon North, Clevedon South, Clevedon Walton, Clevedon West, Easton-in-Gordano, Gordano, Long Ashton, Nailsea East, Nailsea North and West, North Weston, Portishead Central, Portishead Coast, Portishead South, Portishead West, Winford, Wraxall, Wrington, and Yatton.

The constituency contained the northern and eastern parts of the North Somerset unitary authority (formerly the Woodspring district of the County of Avon, and roughly the same area as the ancient Hundred of Portbury). The constituency extended between two rivers with the Avon running along the north-east edge and the Congresbury Yeo to the south. It included the three main towns of Clevedon on the west coast, Nailsea to the south, and Portishead to the north, along with smaller surrounding villages like Backwell, Easton-in-Gordano, and Long Ashton.

=== Boundary review ===
Following the review of parliamentary representation by the Boundary Commission for England in North Somerset which took effect at the 2010 general election, this seat was renamed North Somerset.

== History ==
On its creation in 1983, Woodspring was won by the Conservative Sir Paul Dean, who had held the old seat of Somerset North since 1964. Sir Paul was a Deputy Speaker of the House to George Thomas and latterly Bernard Weatherill from 1982 to 1992; he served longer than anyone else since the post was created in 1902. On his retirement in 1992 Liam Fox succeeded him, and held the seat until its abolition in 2010; during this time he served as a junior minister in the Major government, and later became an opposition frontbencher during the Blair and Brown governments.

== Members of Parliament ==
Election	Member	Party
1983	Sir Paul Dean	Conservative
1992	Liam Fox	Conservative
2010	constituency abolished: see North Somerset	

== Elections ==
=== Elections in the 2000s ===
General election 2005: Woodspring
Party	Candidate	Votes	%	±%
Conservative	Liam Fox	21,587	41.8	−1.9
Liberal Democrats	Mike Bell	15,571	30.2	+6.0
Labour	Chanel Stevens	11,249	21.8	−3.8
Green	Rebecca Lewis	1,309	2.5	−0.1
UKIP	Anthony Butcher	1,269	2.5	+1.6
BNP	Michael Howson	633	1.2	New
Majority		6,016	11.6	−6.5
Turnout		51,618	72.0	+3.3
Conservative hold		Swing	−3.9	

General election 2001: Woodspring
Party	Candidate	Votes	%	±%
Conservative	Liam Fox	21,297	43.7	−0.7
Labour	Chanel Stevens	12,499	25.6	+4.9
Liberal Democrats	Colin Eldridge	11,816	24.2	−6.2
Independent	David Shopland	1,412	2.9	+2.7
Green	Richard Lawson	1,282	2.6	+1.4
UKIP	Fraser Crean	452	0.9	New
Majority		8,798	18.1	+4.1
Turnout		48,758	68.7	−9.7
Conservative hold		Swing		

=== Elections in the 1990s ===
General election 1997: Woodspring
Party	Candidate	Votes	%	±%
Conservative	Liam Fox	24,425	44.4	−10.1
Liberal Democrats	Nan Kirsen	16,691	30.4	+3.0
Labour	Debbie Sander	11,377	20.7	+5.3
Referendum	Richard Hughes	1,641	3.0	New
Green	Richard Lawson	667	1.2	0.0
Independent	Andrew Glover	101	0.2	New
Natural Law	Mike Mears	66	0.2	0.0
Majority		7,734	14.0	−13.1
Turnout		54,968	78.5	−4.8
Conservative hold		Swing	−6.5	

General election 1992: Woodspring
Party	Candidate	Votes	%	±%
Conservative	Liam Fox	35,175	54.5	−2.1
Liberal Democrats	NE Kirsen	17,666	27.4	+0.4
Labour	RE Stone	9,942	15.4	+0.9
Liberal	NE Brown	836	1.3	New
Green	RJ Knifton	801	1.2	−0.8
Natural Law	BD Lee	100	0.2	New
Majority		17,509	27.1	−2.5
Turnout		64,520	83.2	+4.1
Conservative hold		Swing	−1.2	

=== Elections in the 1980s ===
General election 1987: Woodspring
Party	Candidate	Votes	%	±%
Conservative	Paul Dean	34,134	56.6	−1.0
Liberal	Christine Coleman	16,282	27.0	−3.3
Labour	David Chapple	8,717	14.5	+2.7
Green	Brian Keeble	1,208	2.0	New
Majority		17,852	29.59	+2.30
Turnout		60,341	79.10	+1.3
Conservative hold		Swing		

General election 1983: Woodspring
Party	Candidate	Votes	%	±%
Conservative	Paul Dean	31,932	57.59	
Liberal	Rowland Morgan	16,800	30.30	
Labour	David White	6,536	11.79	
Wessex Regionalist	D Robyns	177	0.32	
Majority		15,132	27.29	
Turnout		55,445	77.78	
Conservative win (new seat)				

== See also ==
- List of parliamentary constituencies in Avon
