= Henry Charles Fulford =

19th-century British Liberal Party politician

Fulford

Henry Charles Fulford was a British Liberal Party politician whose election to Parliament was overturned in the courts by an election petition.

== Political career ==
Fulford was Liberal candidate for the Birmingham East division at the 1892 General Election. As with all other Birmingham seats at this time, Birmingham East was a safe Unionist seat. Any prospect Fulford may have had of winning the seat received a setback when an Independent Liberal candidate emerged to split the Liberal vote. He was defeated by over 2,000 votes.

He was then Liberal candidate for the Lichfield division of Staffordshire at the 1895 General Election. This was a Liberal constituency that the party had lost in 1892 by just 11 votes. Fulford was able to win the seat back by a margin of just 44 votes. However, this election was voided following the lodging of a petition on 19 December 1895. About nine months before the election, after Fulford's selection as candidate, a public meeting was held at which he spoke. The meeting ended with a resolution to secure the return of Fulford to Parliament. Although Fulford had yet to be formally adopted by the local Liberal association, this meeting was deemed to have commenced his election campaign. Fulford's return of election expenses had not taken this meeting into consideration.

Fulford did not contest the ensuing 1896 Lichfield by-election but the Liberal Party comfortably won. He did not stand for Parliament again.

=== Electoral record ===
1892 General Election: Birmingham East
Party	Candidate	Votes	%	±%
Conservative	Henry Matthews	5,041	61.7	
Liberal	Henry Fulford	2,832	34.7	
Independent Liberal	Daniel Shilton Collin	296	3.6	
Majority		2,209	27.0	
Turnout		10,404	78.5	
Conservative hold		Swing		

1895 General Election: Lichfield
Party	Candidate	Votes	%	±%
Liberal	Henry Fulford	3,902	50.3	+0.4
Liberal Unionist	Leonard Darwin	3,858	49.7	−0.4
Majority		44	0.6	0.8
Turnout			85.1	+3.7
Liberal gain from Liberal Unionist		Swing	+0.4	
