= Wells and Mendip Hills =

UK Parliament constituency (since 2024)

- County constituency for the House of Commons
- Boundary of Wells and Mendip Hills in South West England
- County: Somerset
- Electorate: 69,843 (2023)
- Major settlements: Wells, Shepton Mallet

Current constituency
- Created: 2024
- Member of Parliament: Tessa Munt (Liberal Democrats)
- Seats: One
- Created from: Wells, Weston-super-Mare, North Somerset & Bridgwater and West Somerset

Wells and Mendip Hills is a constituency of the House of Commons in the UK Parliament. It was first contested at the 2024 general election. It is currently represented by Liberal Democrat Tessa Munt, who was previously MP for Wells from 2010 to 2015.

== Boundaries ==
Map of boundaries from 2024

Under the 2023 Periodic Review of Westminster constituencies, the constituency was defined as being composed of the following as they existed on 1 December 2020:

- The District of Mendip wards of: Chewton Mendip and Ston Easton; Croscombe and Pilton; Moor; Rodney and Westbury; St. Cuthbert Out North; Shepton East; Shepton West; Wells Central; Wells St. Cuthbert's; Wells St. Thomas'; Wookey and St. Cuthbert Out West.
- The District of North Somerset wards of: Banwell & Winscombe; Blagdon & Churchill; Congresbury & Puxton; Yatton.
- The District of Sedgemoor wards of: Axevale; Cheddar and Shipham; East Polden; Knoll; Wedmore and Mark; West Polden.

With effect from 1 April 2023, the Districts of Mendip and Sedgemoor were abolished and absorbed into the new unitary authority of Somerset. Consequently, the constituency now comprises the following from the 2024 general election:

- The District of North Somerset wards of: Banwell & Winscombe; Blagdon & Churchill; Congresbury & Puxton; Yatton.
- The Somerset electoral divisions of: Brent (majority); Cheddar; Huntspill (part); King Alfred (most); Mendip Hills (part); Mendip South (small part); Mendip West; Shepton Mallet; Wells.

The following areas of Somerset make up the constituency:

- The majority of the abolished Wells constituency, including the communities of Axbridge, Cheddar, Shepton Mallet and Wells
- Banwell, Blagdon, Churchill, Congresbury, Puxton and Winscombe from the Weston-super-Mare constituency
- Yatton from the North Somerset constituency
- The Polden Hills area from the abolished Bridgwater and West Somerset constituency

== Elections ==
=== Elections in the 2020s ===
General election 2024: Wells and Mendip Hills
Party	Candidate	Votes	%	±%
Liberal Democrats	Tessa Munt	23,622	46.9	+16.1
Conservative	Meg Powell-Chandler	12,501	24.8	−31.3
Reform UK	Helen Hims	6,611	13.1	N/A
Labour Co-op	Joe Joseph	3,527	7.0	−3.8
Green	Peter Welsh	2,068	4.1	+2.9
Independent	Abi McGuire	1,849	3.7	N/A
Independent	Craig Clarke	190	0.4	N/A
Majority		11,121	22.1	N/A
Turnout		50,368	69.9	−10.9
Registered electors		72,051		
Liberal Democrats gain from Conservative		Swing	+23.7	

2019 notional result
Party	Vote	%
Conservative	31,678	56.1
Liberal Democrats	17,383	30.8
Labour	6,076	10.8
Green	661	1.2
Others	643	1.2
Turnout	56,441	80.8
Electorate	69,843	

== See also ==
- List of parliamentary constituencies in Somerset
