= Results of the 1992 United Kingdom general election =

1992 UK General Election result by constituency

The results of the 1992 United Kingdom general election, by parliamentary constituency were as follows:

Constituency	Cnty	Rgn	Last elctn	Winning party				Turnout (Note: Excludes spoilt ballots)	Votes											
Constituency	Cnty	Rgn	Last elctn	Party	Votes	Share	Majrty	Turnout	Con	Lab (Note: Excludes Speaker) (Note: Includes Labour Party and allied Co-operative Party)	LD	SNP	UUP	SDLP	Grn (Note: Includes Green Party of England and Wales, Scottish Green Party and Green Party in Northern Ireland)	PC	DUP	SF	Other (Note: Includes all other parties, all independent candidates and the Speaker)	Total
Aberavon	WGM	WLS	Lab	Lab	26,877	67.1%	21,310	77.6%	5,567	26,877	4,999					1,919			707	40,069
Aberdeen North	ADC	SCT	Lab	Lab	18,845	47.0%	9,237	66.9%	6,836	18,845	4,772	9,608								40,061
Aberdeen South	ADC	SCT	Lab	Con	15,808	38.5%	1,517	70.2%	15,808	14,291	4,767	6,223								41,089
Aldershot	HAM	SE	Con	Con	36,974	57.5%	19,188	78.7%	36,974	8,552	17,786								1,038	64,350
Aldridge-Brownhills	WMD	WM	Con	Con	28,431	54.3%	11,024	82.6%	28,431	17,407	6,503									52,341
Altrincham and Sale	GTM	NW	Con	Con	29,066	54.7%	16,791	80.2%	29,066	12,275	11,601								212	53,154
Alyn and Deeside	CLY	WLS	Lab	Lab	25,206	52.0%	7,851	80.1%	17,355	25,206	4,687				433	551			200	48,432
Amber Valley	DBY	EM	Con	Con	27,418	46.1%	712	84.7%	27,418	26,706	5,294									59,418
Angus East	AGS	SCT	SNP	SNP	19,006	40.1%	954	75.0%	18,052	5,994	3,897	19,006			449					47,398
Argyll and Bute	AYB	SCT	Lib	LD	12,739	34.9%	2,622	76.1%	10,117	4,946	12,739	8,689								36,491
Arundel	WSX	SE	Con	Con	35,405	58.0%	19,863	77.0%	35,405	8,321	15,542				693					61,064
Ashfield	NTT	EM	Lab	Lab	32,018	54.9%	12,987	80.4%	19,031	32,018	7,291									58,340
Ashford	KNT	SE	Con	Con	31,031	54.6%	17,359	79.2%	31,031	11,365	13,672				773					56,841
Ashton-under-Lyne	GTM	NW	Lab	Lab	24,550	56.6%	10,935	73.9%	13,615	24,550	4,005								1,196	43,366
Aylesbury	BKM	SE	Con	Con	36,500	57.4%	18,860	80.4%	36,500	8,517	17,640				702				239	63,598
Ayr	EAR	SCT	Con	Con	22,172	40.8%	85	83.0%	22,172	22,087	4,067	5,949							132	54,407
Banbury	OXF	SE	Con	Con	32,215	55.0%	16,720	81.5%	32,215	15,495	10,602								250	58,562
Banff and Buchan	ADS	SCT	SNP	SNP	21,954	47.5%	4,108	71.2%	17,846	3,803	2,588	21,954								46,191
Barking	LND	LND	Lab	Lab	18,224	51.6%	6,268	70.0%	11,956	18,224	5,133									35,313
Barnsley Central	SYK	YTH	Lab	Lab	27,048	69.3%	19,361	70.5%	7,687	27,048	4,321									39,056
Barnsley East	SYK	YTH	Lab	Lab	30,346	77.2%	24,777	72.9%	5,569	30,346	3,399									39,314
Barnsley West and Penistone	SYK	YTH	Lab	Lab	27,965	58.3%	14,504	75.7%	13,461	27,965	5,610				970					48,006
Barrow and Furness	CMA	NW	Con	Lab	26,568	47.7%	3,578	82.0%	22,990	26,568	6,089									55,647
Basildon	ESS	E	Con	Con	24,159	44.9%	1,480	79.6%	24,159	22,679	6,967									53,805
Basingstoke	HAM	SE	Con	Con	37,521	54.6%	21,198	82.8%	37,521	16,323	14,119				714					68,677
Bassetlaw	NTT	EM	Lab	Lab	29,061	53.4%	9,997	79.4%	19,064	29,061	6,340									54,465
Bath	AVN	SW	Con	LD	25,718	48.9%	3,768	82.4%	21,950	4,102	25,718				433				368	52,571
Batley and Spen	WYK	YTH	Con	Con	27,629	45.4%	1,408	79.7%	27,629	26,221	6,380				628					60,858
Battersea	LND	LND	Con	Con	26,390	50.5%	4,840	76.6%	26,390	21,550	3,659				584				98	52,281
Beaconsfield	BKM	SE	Con	Con	33,817	64.0%	23,597	79.0%	33,817	7,163	10,220								1,679	52,879
Beckenham	LND	LND	Con	Con	26,323	56.9%	15,285	77.9%	26,323	11,038	8,038								886	46,285
Belfast East	NIR	NIR	DUP	DUP	18,437	51.5%	7,787	67.7%	3,314								18,437	679	13,361	35,791
Belfast North	NIR	NIR	UUP	UUP	17,240	48.0%	9,625	65.2%	2,107				17,240	7,615				4,693	4,259	35,914
Belfast South	NIR	NIR	UUP	UUP	16,336	48.6%	10,070	64.5%	3,356				16,336	6,266				1,123	6,503	33,584
Belfast West	NIR	NIR	SF	SDLP	17,415	43.6%	589	73.2%					4,766	17,415				16,826	963	34,545
Berwick-upon-Tweed	NBL	NE	Lib	LD	19,283	44.4%	5,043	79.1%	14,240	9,933	19,283									43,456
Bethnal Green and Stepney	LND	LND	Lab	Lab	20,350	55.8%	12,230	65.5%	6,507	20,350	8,120								1,466	36,443
Beverley	HUM	YTH	Con	Con	34,503	53.3%	16,517	79.9%	34,503	12,026	17,986								199	64,714
Bexhill and Battle	SXE	SE	Con	Con	31,380	60.3%	16,357	79.1%	31,380	4,883	15,023				594				190	52,070
Bexleyheath	LND	LND	Con	Con	25,606	54.0%	14,086	82.2%	25,606	11,520	10,107								170	47,403
Billericay	ESS	E	Con	Con	37,406	56.5%	22,494	82.3%	37,406	13,880	14,912									66,198
Birkenhead	MSY	NW	Lab	Lab	29,098	63.6%	17,613	73.0%	11,485	29,098	4,417				543				190	45,733
Birmingham Edgbaston	WMD	WM	Con	Con	18,529	49.0%	4,307	71.3%	18,529	14,222	4,419				643					37,813
Birmingham Erdington	WMD	WM	Lab	Lab	18,549	50.5%	4,735	70.1%	13,814	18,549	4,398									36,761
Birmingham Hall Green	WMD	WM	Con	Con	21,649	46.1%	3,665	78.2%	21,649	17,984	7,342									46,975
Birmingham Hodge Hill	WMD	WM	Lab	Lab	21,895	53.6%	7,068	70.8%	14,827	21,895	3,740								370	40,832
Birmingham Ladywood	WMD	WM	Lab	Lab	24,887	66.3%	15,283	65.9%	9,604	24,887	3,068									37,559
Birmingham Northfield	WMD	WM	Con	Lab	24,433	45.5%	630	76.1%	23,803	24,433	5,431									53,667
Birmingham Perry Barr	WMD	WM	Lab	Lab	27,507	53.2%	8,590	71.6%	18,917	27,507	5,261									51,685
Birmingham Selly Oak	WMD	WM	Con	Lab	25,430	44.2%	2,060	76.6%	23,370	25,430	5,679				535				262	55,276
Birmingham Small Heath	WMD	WM	Lab	Lab	22,675	65.3%	13,989	62.8%	8,686	22,675	2,515				824					34,700
Birmingham Sparkbrook	WMD	WM	Lab	Lab	22,116	64.1%	13,572	66.8%	8,544	22,116	3,028				833					34,521
Birmingham Yardley	WMD	WM	Con	Lab	14,884	34.9%	162	78.0%	14,722	14,884	12,899								192	42,697
Bishop Auckland	DUR	NE	Lab	Lab	27,763	50.0%	10,087	76.5%	17,676	27,763	10,099									55,538
Blaby	LEI	EM	Con	Con	39,498	57.9%	25,347	83.4%	39,498	13,780	14,151								781	68,210
Blackburn	LAN	NW	Lab	Lab	26,633	48.4%	6,027	75.1%	20,606	26,633	6,332				878				529	54,978
Blackpool North	LAN	NW	Con	Con	21,501	47.7%	3,040	77.5%	21,501	18,461	4,786								303	45,051
Blackpool South	LAN	NW	Con	Con	19,880	45.2%	1,667	77.3%	19,880	18,213	5,673								173	43,939
Blaenau Gwent	GNT	WLS	Lab	Lab	34,333	79.0%	30,067	78.1%	4,266	34,333	2,774					2,099				43,472
Blaydon	TWR	NE	Lab	Lab	27,028	52.7%	13,343	77.7%	13,685	27,028	10,602									51,315
Blyth Valley	NBL	NE	Lab	Lab	24,542	49.9%	8,044	80.7%	7,691	24,542	16,498				470					49,201
Bolsover	DBY	EM	Lab	Lab	33,978	64.5%	20,655	79.1%	13,323	33,978	5,368									50,622
Bolton North East	GTM	NW	Con	Con	21,644	44.9%	185	82.3%	21,644	21,459	4,971								181	48,255
Bolton South East	GTM	NW	Lab	Lab	26,906	54.3%	12,691	75.5%	14,215	26,906	5,243								3,184	49,548
Bolton West	GTM	NW	Con	Con	26,452	44.4%	1,079	83.5%	26,452	25,373	7,529								240	59,594
Boothferry	HUM	YTH	Con	Con	35,266	54.8%	17,535	79.9%	35,266	17,731	11,388									64,385
Bootle	MSY	NW	Lab	Lab	37,464	74.6%	29,442	72.5%	8,022	37,464	3,301								1,438	50,225
Bosworth	LEI	EM	Con	Con	36,618	54.2%	19,094	84.1%	36,618	17,524	12,643				716					67,501
Bournemouth East	DOR	SW	Con	Con	30,820	56.4%	14,822	72.8%	30,820	7,541	15,998								329	54,688
Bournemouth West	DOR	SW	Con	Con	29,820	52.7%	12,703	75.7%	29,820	9,423	17,117								232	56,592
Bow and Poplar	LND	LND	Lab	Lab	18,487	49.5%	8,404	65.8%	6,876	18,487	10,083				612				1,265	37,323
Bradford North	WYK	YTH	Lab	Lab	23,420	47.8%	7,664	73.4%	15,756	23,420	9,133								654	48,963
Bradford South	WYK	YTH	Lab	Lab	25,185	47.6%	4,902	75.6%	20,283	25,185	7,243								156	52,867
Bradford West	WYK	YTH	Lab	Lab	26,046	53.2%	9,502	69.9%	16,544	26,046	5,150								1,206	48,946
Braintree	ESS	E	Con	Con	34,415	52.3%	17,494	83.4%	34,415	16,921	13,603				855					65,794
Brecon and Radnor	POW	WLS	Lib	Con	15,977	36.1%	130	85.9%	15,977	11,634	15,847				393	418				44,269
Brent East	LND	LND	Lab	Lab	19,387	52.8%	5,971	68.8%	13,416	19,387	3,249				548				96	36,696
Brent North	LND	LND	Con	Con	23,445	56.2%	10,131	70.6%	23,445	13,314	4,149								674	41,582
Brent South	LND	LND	Lab	Lab	20,662	57.5%	9,705	64.1%	10,957	20,662	3,658				479				166	35,992
Brentford and Isleworth	LND	LND	Con	Con	24,752	45.8%	2,086	76.2%	24,752	22,666	5,683				927					54,024
Brentwood and Ongar	ESS	E	Con	Con	32,145	57.6%	15,145	84.7%	32,145	6,080	17,000				555					55,780
Bridgend	MGM	WLS	Lab	Lab	24,143	51.3%	7,326	80.5%	16,817	24,143	4,827					1,301				47,088
Bridgwater	SOM	SW	Con	Con	26,610	46.8%	9,716	79.5%	26,610	12,365	16,894				746				295	56,910
Bridlington	HUM	YTH	Con	Con	33,604	50.8%	16,358	77.8%	33,604	15,263	17,246									66,113
Brigg and Cleethorpes	HUM	YTH	Con	Con	31,673	49.2%	9,179	78.1%	31,673	22,494	9,374				790					64,331
Brighton Kemptown	SXE	SE	Con	Con	21,129	48.1%	3,056	76.1%	21,129	18,073	4,461								230	43,893
Brighton Pavilion	SXE	SE	Con	Con	20,630	46.6%	3,675	76.8%	20,630	16,955	5,606				963				103	44,257
Bristol East	AVN	SW	Con	Lab	22,418	44.6%	2,692	80.3%	19,726	22,418	7,903								270	50,317
Bristol North West	AVN	SW	Con	Con	25,354	42.3%	45	82.3%	25,354	25,309	8,498								729	59,890
Bristol South	AVN	SW	Lab	Lab	25,164	50.2%	8,919	77.8%	16,245	25,164	7,822				756				136	50,123
Bristol West	AVN	SW	Con	Con	22,169	42.2%	6,071	74.0%	22,169	12,992	16,098				906				325	52,490
Bromsgrove	WOR	WM	Con	Con	31,709	54.1%	13,702	82.5%	31,709	18,007	8,090				856					58,662
Broxbourne	HRT	E	Con	Con	36,094	62.6%	23,970	79.9%	36,094	12,124	9,244								198	57,660
Broxtowe	NTT	EM	Con	Con	31,096	51.0%	9,891	83.4%	31,096	21,205	8,395								293	60,989
Buckingham	BKM	SE	Con	Con	29,496	62.5%	19,791	84.2%	29,496	7,662	9,705								353	47,216
Burnley	LAN	SW	Lab	Lab	27,184	53.0%	11,491	74.2%	15,693	27,184	8,414									51,291
Burton	STS	WM	Con	Con	30,845	49.7%	5,996	82.4%	30,845	24,849	6,375									62,069
Bury North	GTM	SW	Con	Con	29,266	49.7%	4,764	84.8%	29,266	24,502	5,010								163	58,941
Bury South	GTM	SW	Con	Con	24,873	46.0%	788	82.1%	24,873	24,085	4,832								228	54,018
Bury St Edmunds	SFK	E	Con	Con	33,554	53.5%	18,787	78.9%	33,554	14,767	13,814								550	62,685
Caernarvon	GWN	WLS	PC	PC	21,439	59.0%	14,476	80.1%	6,963	5,641	2,101					21,439			173	36,317
Caerphilly	GNT	WLS	Lab	Lab	31,713	63.7%	22,672	77.2%	9,041	31,713	4,247					4,821				49,822
Caithness and Sutherland	HLD	SCT	SDP	LD	10,032	45.1%	5,365	72.5%	4,667	3,483	10,032	4,049								22,231
Calder Valley	WYK	YTH	Con	Con	27,753	45.4%	4,878	82.1%	27,753	22,875	9,842				622					61,092
Cambridge	CAM	E	Con	Lab	20,039	39.7%	580	73.2%	19,459	20,039	10,037				720				258	50,513
Cannock and Burntwood	STS	WM	Con	Lab	28,139	46.0%	1,506	84.3%	26,633	28,139	5,899								469	61,140
Canterbury	KNT	SE	Con	Con	29,827	50.8%	10,805	78.1%	29,827	8,936	19,022				747				203	58,735
Cardiff Central	SGM	WLS	Con	Lab	18,014	42.0%	3,465	74.3%	14,549	18,014	9,170				330	748			105	42,916
Cardiff North	SGM	WLS	Con	Con	21,547	45.1%	2,969	84.1%	21,547	18,578	6,487					916			207	47,735
Cardiff South and Penarth	SGM	WLS	Lab	Lab	26,383	55.5%	10,425	77.2%	15,958	26,383	3,707				676	776				47,500
Cardiff West	SGM	WLS	Lab	Lab	24,306	53.2%	9,291	77.5%	15,015	24,306	5,002					1,177			184	45,684
Carlisle	CMA	NW	Lab	Lab	20,479	46.8%	3,108	79.4%	17,371	20,479	5,740								190	43,780
Carmarthen	DFD	WLS	Lab	Lab	20,879	36.6%	2,922	82.7%	12,782	20,879	5,353					17,957				56,971
Carrick, Cumnock and Doon Valley	EAR	SCT	Lab	Lab	25,142	59.1%	16,626	76.9%	8,516	25,142	2,005	6,910								42,573
Carshalton and Wallington	LND	LND	Con	Con	26,243	49.7%	9,943	80.9%	26,243	9,333	16,300				614				266	52,756
Castle Point	ESS	E	Con	Con	29,629	55.6%	16,830	80.4%	29,629	12,799	10,208				643					53,279
Central Fife	FIF	SCT	Lab	Lab	21,036	50.4%	10,578	74.3%	7,353	21,036	2,892	10,458								41,739
Ceredigion and Pembroke North	DFD	WLS	Lib	PC	16,020	31.3%	3,193	77.4%	12,718	9,637	12,827					16,020				51,202
Cheadle	GTM	NW	Con	Con	32,504	58.2%	15,778	84.4%	32,504	6,442	16,726								168	55,840
Chelmsford	ESS	E	Con	Con	39,043	55.3%	18,260	84.6%	39,043	10,010	20,783				769					70,605
Chelsea	LND	LND	Con	Con	17,471	65.1%	12,789	63.3%	17,471	4,682	4,101				485				88	26,827
Cheltenham	GLS	SW	Con	LD	30,351	47.3%	1,668	80.3%	28,683	4,077	30,351								996	64,107
Chertsey and Walton	SRY	SE	Con	Con	34,164	60.2%	22,820	80.5%	34,164	10,793	11,344								444	56,745
Chesham and Amersham	BKS	SE	Con	Con	36,273	63.3%	22,220	81.9%	36,273	5,931	14,053				753				255	57,265
Chesterfield	DBY	EM	Lab	Lab	26,461	47.3%	6,414	78.1%	9,473	26,461	20,047									55,981
Chichester	WSX	SE	Con	Con	37,906	59.3%	20,887	77.8%	37,906	7,192	17,019				876				881	63,874
Chingford	LND	LND	Con	Con	25,730	59.2%	14,938	78.3%	25,730	10,792	5,705				575				643	43,445
Chipping Barnet	LND	LND	Con	Con	25,589	57.0%	13,951	78.6%	25,589	11,638	7,247								435	44,909
Chislehurst	LND	LND	Con	Con	24,761	58.4%	15,276	78.9%	24,761	9,485	6,683				652				849	42,430
Chorley	LAN	NW	Con	Con	30,715	47.2%	4,246	82.8%	30,715	26,469	7,452								402	65,038
Christchurch	HAM	SE	Con	Con	36,627	63.5%	23,015	80.7%	36,627	6,997	13,612								418	57,654
Cirencester and Tewkesbury	GLS	SW	Con	Con	40,258	55.6%	16,058	82.1%	40,258	7,262	24,200								736	72,456
City of Chester	CHS	NW	Con	Con	23,411	44.1%	1,101	83.9%	23,411	22,310	6,867				448				98	53,134
City of Durham	DUR	NE	Lab	Lab	27,095	53.3%	15,058	74.6%	12,037	27,095	10,915				812					50,859
City of London and Westminster South	LND	LND	Con	Con	20,938	60.3%	13,369	63.1%	20,938	7,569	5,392				458				355	34,712
Clackmannan	FLK	SCT	Lab	Lab	18,829	49.1%	8,503	78.3%	6,638	18,829	2,567	10,326								38,360
Clwyd North West	CLY	WLS	Con	Con	24,488	46.2%	6,050	78.6%	24,488	18,438	7,999					1,888			158	52,971
Clwyd South West	CLY	WLS	Lab	Lab	21,490	43.5%	4,941	81.5%	16,549	21,490	6,027				351	4,835			155	49,407
Clydebank and Milngavie	EDB	SCT	Lab	Lab	19,637	53.3%	12,430	77.8%	6,654	19,637	3,216	7,207							112	36,826
Clydesdale	SLK	SCT	Lab	Lab	21,418	44.6%	10,187	77.6%	11,231	21,418	3,957	11,084							342	48,029
Colne Valley	WYK	YTH	Con	Con	24,804	42.0%	7,225	82.0%	24,804	17,579	15,953				443				277	59,056
Congleton	CHS	NW	Con	Con	29,163	49.0%	11,120	84.5%	29,163	11,927	18,043								399	59,532
Conwy	CLY	WLS	Con	Con	14,250	33.7%	995	78.7%	14,250	10,883	13,255					3,108			751	42,247
Copeland	CMA	NW	Lab	Lab	22,328	48.7%	2,439	83.5%	19,889	22,328	3,508								148	45,873
Corby	NTH	EM	Con	Con	25,203	44.5%	342	82.9%	25,203	24,861	5,792								784	56,640
Cornwall North	CUL	SW	Con	LD	29,696	47.4%	1,921	82.1%	27,775	4,103	29,696								1,066	62,640
Coventry North East	WMD	WM	Lab	Lab	24,896	52.5%	11,676	73.2%	13,220	24,896	5,306								4,008	47,430
Coventry North West	WMD	WM	Lab	Lab	20,349	51.7%	6,432	77.6%	13,917	20,349	5,070									39,336
Coventry South East	WMD	WM	Lab	Lab	11,902	32.6%	1,311	74.9%	10,591	11,902	3,318								10,724	36,535
Coventry South West	WMD	WM	Con	Con	23,225	45.7%	1,436	80.1%	23,225	21,789	4,666								1,193	50,873
Crawley	WSX	SE	Con	Con	30,204	48.8%	7,765	79.2%	30,204	22,439	8,558				766					61,967
Crewe and Nantwich	CHS	NW	Lab	Lab	28,065	45.7%	2,695	81.9%	25,370	28,065	7,315				651					61,401
Crosby	MSY	NW	Con	Con	32,267	47.4%	14,806	82.5%	32,267	17,461	16,562				559				1,204	68,053
Croydon Central	LND	LND	Con	Con	22,168	55.4%	9,650	71.7%	22,168	12,518	5,342									40,028
Croydon North East	LND	LND	Spkr	Con	23,835	51.4%	7,473	72.0%	23,835	16,362	6,186									46,383
Croydon North West	LND	LND	Con	Lab	19,152	47.3%	1,526	70.8%	17,626	19,152	3,728									40,506
Croydon South	LND	LND	Con	Con	31,993	63.7%	20,425	77.6%	31,993	6,444	11,568								239	50,244
Cumbernauld and Kilsyth	EDB	SCT	Lab	Lab	19,855	54.0%	9,215	79.9%	4,143	19,855	2,118	10,640								36,756
Cunninghame North	NAR	SCT	Con	Lab	17,564	41.0%	2,939	73.8%	14,625	17,564	2,864	7,813								42,866
Cunninghame South	NAR	SCT	Lab	Lab	19,687	52.9%	10,680	75.9%	6,070	19,687	2,299	9,007							128	37,191
Cynon Valley	MGM	WLS	Lab	Lab	26,254	69.1%	21,364	76.5%	4,890	26,254	2,667					4,186				37,997
Dagenham	LND	LND	Lab	Lab	22,027	52.3%	6,733	70.7%	15,294	22,027	4,824									42,145
Darlington	DUR	NE	Con	Lab	26,556	48.1%	2,798	83.6%	23,758	26,556	4,586								355	55,255
Dartford	KNT	SE	Con	Con	31,194	51.9%	10,314	83.1%	31,194	20,880	7,584								503	60,161
Daventry	NTH	EM	Con	Con	34,734	58.4%	20,274	82.7%	34,734	14,460	9,820								422	59,436
Davyhulme	GTM	NW	Con	Con	24,213	48.0%	4,426	80.5%	24,213	19,790	5,797								665	50,468
Delyn	CLY	WLS	Con	Lab	24,979	45.0%	2,039	83.4%	22,940	24,979	6,208					1,414				55,541
Denton and Reddish	GTM	NW	Lab	Lab	29,021	55.2%	12,084	76.8%	16,937	29,021	4,953								1,650	52,561
Derby North	DBY	EM	Con	Con	28,574	48.4%	4,453	80.7%	28,574	24,121	5,638				383				303	59,019
Derby South	DBY	EM	Lab	Lab	25,917	51.7%	6,936	75.5%	18,981	25,917	5,198									50,096
Devizes	WIL	SW	Con	Con	39,090	53.3%	19,712	81.7%	39,090	13,060	19,378				808				962	73,298
Dewsbury	WYK	YTH	Lab	Lab	25,596	42.4%	634	80.2%	24,962	25,596	6,570				471				806	58,405
Doncaster Central	SYK	YTH	Lab	Lab	27,795	54.3%	10,682	74.2%	17,113	27,795	6,057								184	51,149
Doncaster North	SYK	YTH	Lab	Lab	34,135	61.8%	19,814	73.9%	14,322	34,135	6,787									55,244
Don Valley	SYK	YTH	Lab	Lab	32,008	55.0%	13,534	76.3%	18,474	32,008	6,920				803					58,205
Dorset North	DOR	SW	Con	Con	34,234	54.6%	10,080	81.8%	34,234	4,360	24,154									62,748
Dorset South	DOR	SW	Con	Con	29,319	50.3%	13,508	76.9%	29,319	12,298	15,811								864	58,292
Dorset West	DOR	SW	Con	Con	27,766	50.8%	8,010	81.2%	27,766	7,082	19,756									54,604
Dover	KNT	SE	Con	Con	25,395	44.1%	833	83.5%	25,395	24,562	6,212				637				784	57,590
Dudley East	WMD	WM	Lab	Lab	29,806	52.8%	9,200	75.0%	20,606	29,806	5,400								675	56,487
Dudley West	WMD	WM	Lab	Lab	34,729	48.8%	5,789	82.1%	34,729	28,940	7,446									71,115
Dulwich	LND	LND	Con	Lab	17,714	47.3%	2,056	67.9%	15,658	17,714	4,078									37,450
Dumbarton	WDB	SCT	Lab	Lab	19,255	43.6%	6,129	77.1%	13,126	19,255	3,425	8,127							192	44,125
Dumfries	DFG	SCT	Con	Con	21,089	43.1%	6,415	80.0%	21,089	14,674	5,749	6,971							419	48,902
Dundee East	AGS	SCT	Lab	Lab	18,761	44.1%	4,564	72.1%	7,549	18,761	1,725	14,197			205				77	42,514
Dundee West	AGS	SCT	Lab	Lab	20,498	49.0%	10,604	69.8%	7,746	20,498	3,132	9,894			432				159	41,861
Dunfermline East	FIF	SCT	Lab	Lab	23,692	62.4%	17,444	75.6%	6,248	23,692	2,262	5,746								37,948
Dunfermline West	FIF	SCT	Lab	Lab	16,374	42.0%	7,484	76.4%	8,890	16,374	6,122	7,563								38,949
Durham North	DUR	NE	Lab	Lab	33,567	59.9%	19,637	76.1%	13,930	33,567	8,572									56,069
Ealing Acton	LND	LND	Con	Con	22,579	50.6%	7,007	76.0%	22,579	15,572	5,487				554				432	44,624
Ealing North	LND	LND	Con	Con	24,898	49.7%	5,966	78.8%	24,898	18,932	5,247				554				457	50,088
Ealing Southall	LND	LND	Lab	Lab	23,476	47.4%	6,866	75.5%	16,610	23,476	3,790				964				4,665	49,505
Easington	DUR	NE	Lab	Lab	34,269	72.7%	26,390	72.5%	7,879	34,269	5,001									47,149
East Antrim	NIR	NIR	UUP	UUP	16,966	43.2%	7,422	62.4%	3,359				16,966				9,544		9,382	39,251
East Berkshire	BRK	SE	Con	Con	43,898	59.7%	28,680	81.4%	43,898	14,458	15,218									73,574
East Kilbride	SLK	SCT	Lab	Lab	24,055	46.9%	11,992	80.0%	9,781	24,055	5,377	12,063								51,276
East Lindsey	LIN	EM	Con	Con	31,916	51.1%	11,846	78.1%	31,916	9,477	20,070				1,018					62,481
East Londonderry	NIR	NIR	UUP	UUP	30,370	57.6%	18,527	69.8%	1,589				30,370	11,843				5,320	3,613	52,735
East Lothian	ELO	SCT	Lab	Lab	25,537	46.5%	10,036	82.4%	15,501	25,537	6,126	7,776								54,940
East Surrey	SRY	SE	Con	Con	29,767	62.3%	17,656	82.3%	29,767	5,075	12,111				819					47,772
Eastbourne	SXE	SE	Con	Con	31,792	51.6%	5,481	80.9%	31,792	2,834	26,311				391				296	61,624
Eastleigh	HAM	SE	Con	Con	38,998	51.3%	17,702	82.9%	38,998	15,768	21,296									76,062
Eastwood	RFW	SCT	Con	Con	24,124	46.8%	11,668	81.0%	24,124	12,436	8,493	6,372							146	51,571
Eccles	GTM	NW	Lab	Lab	27,357	56.9%	13,226	74.1%	14,131	27,357	5,835				521				270	48,114
Eddisbury	CHS	NW	Con	Con	31,625	51.0%	12,697	82.6%	31,625	18,928	10,543				783				107	61,986
Edinburgh Central	EDB	SCT	Lab	Lab	15,189	38.8%	2,126	69.3%	13,063	15,189	4,500	5,539			630				235	39,156
Edinburgh East	EDB	SCT	Lab	Lab	15,446	45.7%	7,211	73.9%	8,235	15,446	3,432	6,225			424					33,762
Edinburgh Leith	EDB	SCT	Lab	Lab	13,790	34.2%	4,985	71.1%	8,496	13,790	4,975	8,805							4,238	40,304
Edinburgh Pentlands	EDB	SCT	Con	Con	18,128	40.7%	4,290	80.2%	18,128	13,838	5,597	6,882							111	44,556
Edinburgh South	EDB	SCT	Lab	Lab	18,485	41.5%	4,176	72.7%	14,309	18,485	5,961	5,727							108	44,590
Edinburgh West	EDB	SCT	Con	Con	18,071	37.0%	879	82.6%	18,071	8,769	17,192	4,117			234				405	48,778
Edmonton	LND	LND	Con	Con	22,076	46.3%	593	75.6%	22,076	21,483	3,940								207	47,706
Ellesmere Port and Neston	CHS	NW	Con	Lab	27,782	46.1%	1,989	84.1%	25,793	27,782	5,944				589				105	60,213
Elmet	WYK	YTH	Con	Con	27,677	47.5%	3,261	82.4%	27,677	24,416	6,144									58,237
Eltham	LND	LND	Con	Con	18,813	46.0%	1,666	78.7%	18,813	17,147	4,804								165	40,929
Enfield North	LND	LND	Con	Con	27,789	52.9%	9,430	77.9%	27,789	18,359	5,817								565	52,530
Enfield Southgate	LND	LND	Con	Con	28,422	58.0%	15,563	76.3%	28,422	12,859	7,080				696					49,057
Epping Forest	ESS	E	Con	Con	32,407	59.5%	20,188	80.5%	32,407	12,219	9,265								552	54,443
Epsom and Ewell	SRY	SE	Con	Con	32,861	60.2%	20,021	80.1%	32,861	8,577	12,840								334	54,612
Erewash	SRY	SE	Con	Con	29,907	47.2%	5,703	83.7%	29,907	24,204	8,606								645	63,362
Erith and Crayford	KNT	SE	Con	Con	21,926	46.5%	2,339	79.7%	21,926	19,587	5,657									47,170
Esher	SRY	SE	Con	Con	31,115	65.4%	20,371	80.8%	31,115	5,685	10,744									47,544
Exeter	DEV	SW	Con	Con	25,543	41.1%	3,045	80.5%	25,543	22,498	12,059				764				1,217	62,081
Falkirk East	FLK	SCT	Lab	Lab	18,423	46.1%	7,969	76.9%	8,279	18,423	2,775	10,454								39,931
Falkirk West	FLK	SCT	Lab	Lab	19,162	49.8%	9,812	76.8%	7,558	19,162	2,414	9,350								38,484
Falmouth and Camborne	CUL	SW	Con	Con	21,150	36.9%	3,267	81.1%	21,150	16,732	17,883				466				1,113	57,344
Fareham	HAM	SE	Con	Con	40,482	61.0%	24,141	81.9%	40,482	8,766	16,341				818					66,407
Faversham	KNT	SE	Con	Con	32,755	50.1%	16,351	79.7%	32,755	16,404	15,896								294	65,352
Feltham and Heston	LND	LND	Con	Lab	27,660	46.1%	1,995	73.9%	25,665	27,660	6,700									60,025
Fermanagh and South Tyrone	NIR	NIR	UUP	UUP	26,923	48.8%	14,113	78.5%					26,923	12,810				12,604	2,791	55,128
Finchley	LND	LND	Con	Con	21,039	51.2%	6,388	77.6%	21,039	14,651	4,568				564				259	41,081
Folkestone and Hythe	KNT	SE	Con	Con	27,437	52.3%	8,910	79.6%	27,437	6,347	18,527								123	52,434
Foyle	NIR	NIR	SDLP	SDLP	26,710	51.5%	13,005	69.5%						26,710			13,705	9,149	2,326	51,890
Fulham	LND	LND	Con	Con	21,438	53.4%	6,579	75.9%	21,438	14,859	3,339				443				91	40,170
Fylde	LAN	NW	Con	Con	30,639	61.4%	20,991	78.5%	30,639	9,382	9,648								239	49,908
Gainsborough and Horncastle	LIN	EM	Con	Con	31,444	54.0%	16,245	80.9%	31,444	11,619	15,199									58,262
Galloway and Upper Nithsdale	DAG	SCT	Con	Con	18,681	42.0%	2,468	81.7%	18,681	5,766	3,826	16,213								44,486
Gateshead East	TWR	NE	Lab	Lab	30,100	63.5%	18,530	73.6%	11,570	30,100	5,720									47,390
Gedling	NTT	EM	Con	Con	30,191	53.2%	10,637	82.3%	30,191	19,554	6,863								168	56,776
Gillingham	KNT	SE	Con	Con	30,201	52.3%	16,638	80.3%	30,201	13,563	13,509								438	57,711
Glanford and Scunthorpe	HUM	YTH	Con	Lab	30,637	52.8%	8,411	79.0%	22,226	30,637	4,186								996	58,045
Glasgow Cathcart	GSO	SCT	Lab	Lab	16,265	48.3%	8,001	75.2%	8,264	16,265	2,614	6,107			441					33,691
Glasgow Central	GSO	SCT	Lab	Lab	17,341	57.2%	11,019	63.1%	4,208	17,341	1,921	6,322			435				106	30,333
Glasgow Garscadden	GSO	SCT	Lab	Lab	18,920	64.4%	13,340	71.3%	3,385	18,920	1,425	5,580							61	29,371
Glasgow Govan	GSO	SCT	Lab	Lab	17,051	49.0%	4,125	75.9%	3,458	17,051	1,227	12,926			181					34,843
Glasgow Hillhead	GSO	SCT	Lab	Lab	15,148	38.5%	4,826	68.7%	6,728	15,148	10,322	6,484			558				133	39,373
Glasgow Maryhill	GSO	SCT	Lab	Lab	19,452	61.6%	13,419	65.2%	3,248	19,452	2,215	6,033			530				78	31,556
Glasgow Pollok	GSO	SCT	Lab	Lab	14,170	43.4%	7,883	70.7%	5,147	14,170	1,932	5,107							6,287	32,643
Glasgow Provan	GSO	SCT	Lab	Lab	15,885	66.5%	10,703	65.3%	1,865	15,885	948	5,182								23,880
Glasgow Rutherglen	GSO	SCT	Lab	Lab	21,962	55.4%	15,270	75.2%	6,692	21,962	4,470	6,470							62	39,656
Glasgow Shettleston	GSO	SCT	Lab	Lab	21,665	60.6%	14,834	68.9%	5,396	21,665	1,881	6,831								35,773
Glasgow Springburn	GSO	SCT	Lab	Lab	20,369	67.7%	14,506	65.7%	2,625	20,369	1,242	5,863								30,099
Gloucester	GLS	SW	Con	Con	29,870	46.2%	6,069	80.2%	29,870	23,801	10,978									64,649
Gordon	ADS	SCT	Lib	LD	22,158	37.4%	274	74.3%	21,884	6,682	22,158	8,445								59,169
Gosport	HAM	SE	Con	Con	31,094	58.1%	16,318	76.6%	31,094	7,275	14,776								332	53,477
Gower	WGM	WLS	Lab	Lab	23,485	50.1%	7,048	81.9%	16,437	23,485	4,655				448	1,639			188	46,852
Grantham	LIN	EM	Con	Con	37,194	56.2%	19,588	79.2%	37,194	17,606	9,882								1,500	66,182
Gravesham	KNT	SE	Con	Con	29,322	49.7%	5,493	83.4%	29,322	23,829	5,269								634	59,054
Great Grimsby	HUM	EM	Lab	Lab	25,897	51.0%	7,506	75.3%	18,391	25,897	6,475									50,763
Great Yarmouth	NFK	E	Con	Con	25,505	47.9%	5,309	77.9%	25,505	20,196	7,225								284	53,210
Greenock and Port Glasgow	IVC	SCT	Lab	Lab	22,258	58.0%	14,979	73.7%	4,779	22,258	4,359	7,279								38,675
Greenwich	LND	LND	SDP	Lab	14,630	41.0%	1,357	74.6%	6,960	14,630	13,273				483				320	35,666
Guildford	SRY	SE	Con	Con	33,516	55.3%	13,404	78.5%	33,516	6,781	20,112								234	60,643
Hackney North and Stoke Newington	LND	LND	Lab	Lab	20,083	57.8%	10,727	63.5%	9,356	20,083	3,996				1,111				178	34,724
Hackney South and Shoreditch	LND	LND	Lab	Lab	19,730	53.4%	9,016	63.8%	10,714	19,730	5,533				772				226	36,975
Halesowen and Stourbridge	WMD	WM	Con	Con	32,312	50.6%	9,582	82.3%	32,312	22,730	7,941				908					63,891
Halifax	WYK	YTH	Lab	Lab	25,115	43.5%	478	77.7%	24,637	25,115	7,364								649	57,765
Halton	CHS	NW	Lab	Lab	35,005	59.7%	18,184	78.3%	16,821	35,005	6,104								736	58,666
Hamilton	SLK	SCT	Lab	Lab	25,849	55.2%	16,603	76.2%	8,250	25,849	3,515	9,246								48,860
Hammersmith	LND	LND	Lab	Lab	17,329	51.0%	4,754	71.5%	12,575	17,329	3,380				546				130	33,960
Hampshire East	HAM	SE	Con	Con	47,541	64.2%	29,165	79.3%	47,541	6,840	18,376				1,113				165	74,035
Hampstead and Highgate	LND	LND	Con	Lab	19,193	45.1%	1,440	72.7%	17,753	19,193	4,765				594				207	42,512
Harborough	LEI	EM	Con	Con	34,280	54.6%	13,543	82.1%	34,280	7,483	20,737								328	62,828
Harlow	ESS	E	Con	Con	26,608	47.0%	2,940	82.6%	26,608	23,668	6,375									56,651
Harrogate	NYK	YTH	Con	Con	32,023	53.9%	12,589	78.0%	32,023	7,230	19,434				780					59,467
Harrow East	LND	LND	Con	Con	30,752	52.9%	11,098	77.8%	30,752	19,654	6,360								1,403	58,169
Harrow West	LND	LND	Con	Con	30,240	55.2%	17,897	78.7%	30,240	12,343	11,050								1,151	54,784
Hartlepool	CLV	NE	Lab	Lab	26,816	51.9%	8,782	76.1%	18,034	26,816	6,860									51,710
Harwich	ESS	E	Con	Con	32,369	51.9%	17,159	77.7%	32,369	14,511	15,210								279	62,369
Hastings and Rye	SXE	SE	Con	Con	25,573	47.6%	6,634	74.9%	25,573	8,458	18,939				640				168	53,778
Havant	HAM	SE	Con	Con	32,233	55.0%	17,584	79.0%	32,233	10,968	14,649				793					58,643
Hayes and Harlington	LND	LND	Con	Con	19,489	44.9%	53	79.7%	19,489	19,436	4,472									43,397
Hazel Grove	GTM	NW	Con	Con	24,479	44.8%	929	84.9%	24,479	6,390	23,550								204	54,623
Hemsworth	WYK	YTH	Lab	Lab	29,942	70.8%	22,075	75.9%	7,867	29,942	4,459									42,268
Hendon North	LND	LND	Con	Con	20,569	53.2%	7,122	75.1%	20,569	13,447	4,136				430				95	38,677
Hendon South	LND	LND	Con	Con	20,593	58.8%	12,047	72.4%	20,593	8,546	5,609								289	35,037
Henley	OXF	SE	Con	Con	30,835	59.7%	18,392	79.8%	30,835	7,676	12,443								705	51,659
Hereford	HWR	WM	Con	Con	26,727	47.2%	3,413	81.3%	26,727	6,005	23,314				596					56,642
Hertford and Stortford	HRT	E	Con	Con	35,716	57.5%	20,210	81.0%	35,716	10,125	15,506				780					62,127
Hertsmere	HRT	E	Con	Con	32,133	56.8%	18,735	80.9%	32,133	13,398	10,681								373	56,585
Hexham	NBL	NE	Con	Con	24,967	52.4%	13,438	82.4%	24,967	11,529	10,344				781					47,621
Heywood and Middleton	GTM	NW	Lab	Lab	22,380	52.3%	8,074	74.9%	14,306	22,380	5,252								891	42,829
High Peak	DBY	EM	Con	Con	27,538	46.0%	4,819	84.6%	27,538	22,719	8,861				794					59,912
Holborn and St Pancras South	LND	LND	Lab	Lab	22,243	54.8%	10,824	62.7%	11,419	22,243	5,476				959				520	40,617
Holland with Boston	LIN	EM	Con	Con	29,159	55.1%	13,831	77.9%	29,159	15,328	8,434									52,921
Honiton	DEV	SW	Con	Con	33,533	52.4%	16,511	80.7%	33,533	8,142	17,022				650				4,622	63,969
Hornchurch	LND	LND	Con	Con	25,817	53.5%	9,165	79.8%	25,817	16,652	5,366								453	48,288
Hornsey and Wood Green	LND	LND	Con	Lab	27,020	48.5%	5,177	75.9%	21,843	27,020	5,547				1,051				286	55,747
Horsham	WSX	SE	Con	Con	42,210	61.7%	25,072	81.3%	42,210	6,745	17,138				692				1,613	68,398
Houghton and Washington	TWR	NE	Lab	Lab	34,733	62.0%	20,808	70.6%	13,925	34,733	7,346									56,004
Hove	WSE	SE	Con	Con	24,525	49.0%	12,268	74.1%	24,525	12,257	9,709				814				2,784	50,089
Huddersfield	WYK	EM	Lab	Lab	23,832	48.7%	7,258	72.4%	16,574	23,832	7,777				576				135	48,894
Huntingdon	CAM	E	Con	Con	48,662	66.2%	36,230	79.2%	48,662	12,432	9,386				846				2,228	73,554
Hyndburn	LAN	NW	Con	Con	23,042	46.9%	1,960	83.9%	21,082	23,042	4,886								150	49,160
Ilford North	LND	LND	Con	Con	24,678	54.0%	9,051	77.9%	24,678	15,627	5,430									45,735
Ilford South	LND	LND	Con	Lab	19,418	45.4%	402	76.7%	19,016	19,418	4,126								269	42,829
Inverness, Nairn and Lochaber	HLD	SCT	Lib	LD	13,258	26.0%	458	73.6%	11,517	12,800	13,258	12,562			766					50,903
Ipswich	SFK	E	Con	Lab	23,680	43.8%	265	80.3%	23,415	23,680	6,159				591				181	54,026
Isle of Wight	IOW	SE	Con	Con	38,163	47.9%	1,827	79.8%	38,163	4,784	36,336								350	79,633
Islington North	LND	LND	Lab	Lab	21,742	57.4%	12,784	66.6%	8,958	21,742	5,732				1,420					37,852
Islington South and Finsbury	LND	LND	Lab	Lab	20,586	51.1%	10,652	72.5%	9,934	20,586	9,387								374	40,281
Islwyn	GNT	WLS	Lab	Lab	30,908	74.3%	24,728	81.4%	6,180	30,908	2,352					1,606			547	41,593
Jarrow	TWR	NE	Lab	Lab	28,956	62.1%	17,907	74.4%	11,049	28,956	6,608									46,613
Keighley	WYK	YTH	Con	Con	25,983	47.4%	3,596	82.6%	25,983	22,387	5,793				642					54,805
Kensington	LND	LND	Con	Con	15,540	50.3%	3,548	73.3%	15,540	11,992	2,770				415				161	30,878
Kettering	NTH	EM	Con	Con	29,115	52.0%	11,154	82.6%	29,115	17,961	8,962									56,038
Kilmarnock and Loudoun	EAR	SCT	Lab	Lab	22,210	44.8%	6,979	80.0%	9,438	22,210	2,722	15,231								49,601
Kincardine and Deeside	ADS	SCT	Con	Con	22,924	43.7%	4,495	79.3%	22,924	4,795	18,429	5,927			381					52,456
Kingston upon Hull East	HUM	YTH	Lab	Lab	30,096	62.9%	18,723	69.3%	11,373	30,096	6,050								323	47,842
Kingston upon Hull North	HUM	YTH	Lab	Lab	26,619	55.9%	15,384	66.7%	11,235	26,619	9,504								254	47,612
Kingston upon Hull West	HUM	YTH	Lab	Lab	21,139	57.3%	10,585	65.7%	10,554	21,139	4,867								308	36,868
Kingston upon Thames	LND	LND	Con	Con	20,675	51.6%	10,153	78.4%	20,675	7,748	10,522								1,106	40,051
Kingswood	AVN	SW	Con	Lab	26,774	44.5%	2,370	83.8%	24,404	26,774	8,967									60,145
Kirkcaldy	FIF	SCT	Lab	Lab	17,887	46.0%	9,126	74.8%	8,476	17,887	3,729	8,761								38,853
Knowsley North	MSY	NW	Lab	Lab	27,517	77.5%	22,043	72.8%	5,114	27,517	1,515								1,359	35,505
Knowsley South	MSY	NW	Lab	Lab	31,933	68.6%	22,011	74.7%	9,922	31,933	4,480								217	46,552
Lagan Valley	NIR	NIR	UUP	UUP	29,772	60.8%	23,565	67.3%	4,423				29,772	4,626				3,346	6,789	48,956
Lancaster	LAN	NW	Con	Con	21,084	45.6%	2,953	78.9%	21,084	18,131	6,524				433				83	46,255
Langbaurgh	CLV	NE	Con	Con	30,018	45.4%	1,564	83.1%	30,018	28,454	7,615									66,087
Leeds Central	WYK	YTH	Lab	Lab	23,673	62.2%	15,020	61.3%	8,653	23,673	5,713									38,039
Leeds East	WYK	YTH	Lab	Lab	24,929	57.7%	12,697	70.0%	12,232	24,929	6,040									43,201
Leeds North East	WYK	YTH	Con	Con	22,462	45.4%	4,244	76.6%	22,462	18,218	8,274				546					49,500
Leeds North West	WYK	YTH	Con	Con	21,750	43.0%	7,671	72.5%	21,750	13,782	14,079				519				427	50,557
Leeds West	WYK	YTH	Lab	Lab	26,310	55.1%	13,828	71.2%	12,482	26,310	4,252				569				4,112	47,725
Leicester East	LEI	EM	Lab	Lab	28,123	56.3%	11,316	78.7%	16,807	28,123	4,043				453				494	49,920
Leicester South	LEI	EM	Lab	Lab	27,934	52.3%	9,440	75.1%	18,494	27,934	6,271				554				154	53,407
Leicester West	LEI	EM	Lab	Lab	22,574	46.8%	3,978	73.7%	18,596	22,574	6,402				517				171	48,260
Leigh	GTM	SW	Lab	Lab	32,225	61.3%	18,827	75.0%	13,398	32,225	6,621								320	52,564
Leominster	HWR	WM	Con	Con	32,783	56.6%	16,680	81.7%	32,783	6,874	16,103				1,503				640	57,903
Lewes	SXE	SE	Con	Con	33,042	54.6%	12,175	81.8%	33,042	5,758	20,867				719				87	60,473
Lewisham Deptford	LND	LND	Lab	Lab	22,574	60.9%	12,238	65.1%	10,336	22,574	4,181									37,091
Lewisham East	LND	LND	Con	Lab	19,576	45.4%	1,095	74.8%	18,481	15,576	4,877								196	43,128
Lewisham West	LND	LND	Con	Lab	20,378	47.0%	1,809	73.0%	18,569	20,378	4,295								125	43,367
Leyton	LND	LND	Lab	Lab	20,334	52.6%	11,452	67.4%	8,882	20,334	8,180				412				817	38,625
Lincoln	LIN	EM	Con	Con	28,792	46.1%	2,049	79.1%	28,792	26,743	6,316								603	62,454
Linlithgow	WLO	SCT	Lab	Lab	21,603	45.0%	7,026	78.7%	8,424	21,603	3,446	14,577								48,050
Littleborough and Saddleworth	GTM	NW	Con	Con	23,682	44.2%	4,494	81.6%	23,682	10,649	19,188									53,519
Liverpool Broadgreen	MSY	NW	Lab	Lab	18,062	43.2%	7,027	69.6%	5,405	18,062	11,035								7,312	41,814
Liverpool Garston	MSY	NW	Lab	Lab	23,212	57.1%	12,279	70.6%	10,933	23,212	5,398								1,081	40,624
Liverpool Mossley Hill	MSY	NW	Lib	LD	19,809	47.9%	2,606	68.5%	4,269	17,203	19,809								114	41,395
Liverpool Riverside	MSY	NW	Lab	Lab	20,550	75.9%	17,437	54.6%	3,113	20,550	2,498				738				169	27,068
Liverpool Walton	MSY	NW	Lab	Lab	34,214	72.4%	28,299	67.4%	5,915	34,214	5,672								1,454	47,255
Liverpool West Derby	MSY	NW	Lab	Lab	27,014	68.2%	20,425	69.8%	6,589	27,014	4,838								1,175	39,616
Livingston	WLO	SCT	Lab	Lab	20,245	44.4%	8,105	74.6%	8,824	20,245	3,911	12,140			469					45,589
Llanelli	DFD	WLS	Lab	Lab	27,802	55.0%	19,270	77.8%	8,532	27,802	6,404					7,878				50,616
Loughborough	LEI	EM	Con	Con	30,064	50.7%	10,883	78.5%	30,064	19,181	8,953				817				233	59,248
Ludlow	SPS	WM	Con	Con	28,719	51.5%	14,152	80.9%	28,719	11,709	14,567				758					55,753
Luton North	BDF	E	Con	Con	33,777	53.7%	13,094	81.8%	33,777	20,683	7,570				633				292	62,955
Luton South	BDF	E	Con	Con	25,900	44.8%	799	79.1%	25,900	25,101	6,020				550				191	57,762
Macclesfield	CHS	NW	Con	Con	36,447	57.9%	22,767	82.3%	36,447	13,680	12,600								268	62,995
Maidstone	KNT	SE	Con	Con	31,611	54.2%	16,286	80.1%	31,611	10,517	15,325				707				172	58,332
Makerfield	GTM	NW	Lab	Lab	32,832	60.4%	18,118	76.1%	14,714	32,832	5,097								1,706	54,349
Manchester Blackley	GTM	NW	Lab	Lab	23,031	60.2%	12,389	69.3%	10,642	23,031	4,324								288	38,285
Manchester Central	GTM	NW	Lab	Lab	23,336	72.7%	18,037	56.9%	5,299	23,336	3,151								334	32,120
Manchester Gorton	GTM	NW	Lab	Lab	23,671	62.3%	16,279	60.8%	7,392	23,671	5,327				595				989	37,974
Manchester Withington	GTM	NW	Lab	Lab	23,962	52.7%	9,735	71.3%	14,227	23,962	6,457				725				128	45,499
Manchester Wythenshawe	GTM	NW	Lab	Lab	22,591	60.5%	11,996	69.7%	10,595	22,591	3,633				362				133	37,314
Mansfield	NTT	EM	Lab	Lab	29,932	54.4%	11,724	82.2%	18,208	29,932	6,925									55,065
Medway	KNT	SE	Con	Con	25,924	52.3%	8,786	80.2%	25,924	17,138	4,751								1,714	49,527
Meirionnydd Nant Conwy	CLY	WLS	PC	PC	11,608	44.0%	4,613	81.5%	6,995	4,978	2,358				471	11,608				26,410
Meriden	WMD	WM	Con	Con	33,462	55.1%	14,699	78.8%	33,462	18,763	8,489									60,714
Merthyr Tydfil and Rhymney	GNT	WLS	Lab	Lab	31,710	71.6%	26,713	75.8%	4,904	31,710	4,997					2,704				44,315
Mid Bedfordshire	BDF	SE	Con	Con	40,230	58.2%	25,138	84.4%	40,230	15,092	11,957								1,861	69,140
Mid Kent	KNT	SE	Con	Con	33,633	56.7%	19,649	79.7%	33,633	13,984	11,476								224	59,317
Mid Norfolk	NFK	E	Con	Con	35,620	54.3%	18,948	81.5%	35,620	16,672	13,072								226	65,590
Mid Staffordshire	STS	WM	Con	Con	31,227	49.7%	6,236	85.6%	31,227	24,991	6,402								239	62,859
Mid Sussex	WSX	SE	Con	Con	39,524	59.0%	20,528	82.9%	39,524	6,951	18,996				772				727	66,970
Mid Ulster	NIR	NIR	DUP	DUP	23,181	42.3%	6,187	79.2%						16,994			23,181	10,248	4,340	54,763
Mid Worcestershire	WOR	WM	Con	Con	33,964	49.7%	9,870	81.1%	33,964	24,094	9,745								520	68,323
Middlesbrough	CLV	NE	Lab	Lab	26,343	64.1%	15,784	69.8%	10,559	26,343	4,201									41,103
Midlothian	MLO	SCT	Lab	Lab	20,588	43.9%	10,334	77.9%	9,443	20,588	6,164	10,254			476					46,925
Milton Keynes North East	BKM	SE	(Note: New constituency)	Con	26,212	51.6%	14,176	81.0%	26,212	12,036	11,693				529				328	50,798
Milton Keynes South West	BKM	SE		Con	23,840	46.6%	4,687	77.0%	23,840	19,153	7,429				525				202	51,149
Mitcham and Morden	LND	LND	Con	Con	23,789	46.5%	1,734	80.3%	23,789	22,055	4,687				655					51,186
Mole Valley	SRY	SE	Con	Con	32,549	59.3%	15,950	82.0%	32,549	5,291	16,599								442	54,881
Monklands East	NLK	SCT	Lab	Lab	22,266	61.3%	15,712	75.0%	5,830	22,266	1,679	6,554								36,329
Monklands West	NLK	SCT	Lab	Lab	23,384	61.3%	17,065	77.4%	6,074	23,384	2,382	6,319								38,159
Monmouth	GNT	WLS	Con	Con	24,059	47.3%	3,204	86.1%	24,059	20,855	5,562					431				50,907
Montgomery	POW	WLS	Lib	LD	16,031	48.5%	5,209	79.9%	10,822	4,115	16,031				508	1,581				33,057
Moray	MOR	SCT	SNP	SNP	20,299	44.3%	2,844	73.2%	17,455	5,448	2,634	20,299								45,836
Morecambe and Lunesdale	LAN	NW	Con	Con	22,507	50.9%	11,509	78.3%	22,507	10,998	9,584								1,121	44,210
Morley and Leeds South	WYK	YTH	Lab	Lab	23,896	52.2%	7,372	72.5%	16,524	23,896	5,062								327	45,809
Motherwell North	NLK	SCT	Lab	Lab	27,852	63.4%	18,910	76.9%	5,011	27,852	2,145	8,942								43,950
Motherwell South	NLK	SCT	Lab	Lab	21,771	57.1%	14,013	76.1%	6,097	21,771	2,349	7,758							146	38,121
Neath	WGM	WLS	Lab	Lab	30,903	68.0%	23,975	80.6%	6,928	30,903	2,467					5,145				45,443
New Forest	HAM	SE	Con	Con	37,986	62.4%	20,405	80.8%	37,986	4,989	17,581								350	60,906
Newark	NTT	E	Con	Con	28,494	50.4%	8,229	82.2%	28,494	20,265	7,342				435					56,536
Newbury	BRK	SE	Con	Con	37,135	55.9%	12,357	82.8%	37,135	3,962	24,778				539					66,414
Newcastle upon Tyne Central	TWR	NE	Lab	Lab	21,123	49.4%	5,288	71.3%	15,835	21,123	5,816									42,774
Newcastle upon Tyne East	TWR	NE	Lab	Lab	24,342	60.2%	13,877	70.7%	10,465	24,342	4,883				744					40,434
Newcastle upon Tyne North	TWR	NE	Lab	Lab	25,121	49.4%	8,946	76.8%	16,175	25,121	9,542									50,838
Newcastle-under-Lyme	STS	WM	Lab	Lab	25,652	47.9%	9,839	80.8%	15,813	25,652	11,727								314	53,506
Newham North East	LND	LND	Lab	Lab	20,952	58.3%	9,986	60.3%	10,966	20,952	4,020									35,938
Newham North West	LND	LND	Lab	Lab	15,911	61.1%	9,171	56.0%	6,740	15,911	2,445				587				352	26,035
Newham South	LND	LND	Lab	Lab	14,358	46.6%	2,502	60.2%	11,856	14,358	4,527									30,786
Newport East	GWT	WLS	Lab	Lab	23,050	55.0%	9,899	81.2%	13,151	23,050	4,991					716				41,908
Newport West	GWT	WLS	Con	Lab	24,139	53.1%	7,770	82.8%	16,360	24,139	4,296					653				45,059
Newry and Armagh	NIR	NIR	SDLP	SDLP	26,073	49.6%	7,091	77.9%					18,982	26,073				6,547	972	52,574
Normanton	WYK	YTH	Lab	Lab	25,936	51.8%	8,950	76.3%	16,986	25,936	7,137									50,059
North Antrim	NIR	NIR	DUP	DUP	23,152	50.9%	14,936	65.8%	2,263				8,216	6,512			23,152	1,916	3,442	45,501
North Bedfordshire	BDF	E	Con	Con	29,970	50.7%	11,668	80.1%	29,970	18,302	10,014				643				178	59,107
North Colchester	ESS	E	Con	Con	35,123	51.5%	16,402	79.1%	35,123	13,870	18,721				372				238	68,414
North Devon	DEV	SW	Con	LD	27,414	47.1%	794	84.4%	26,620	3,410	27,414				658				107	58,209
North Down	NIR	NIR	UPUP	UPUP	19,305	42.9%	4,934	65.5%	14,371								4,414		6,866	44,956
North East Cambridgeshire	CAM	E	Con	Con	34,288	54.0%	15,093	79.3%	34,288	8,746	19,195								1,225	63,454
North East Derbyshire	DBY	EM	Lab	Lab	28,860	48.8%	6,270	80.6%	22,590	28,860	7,675									59,125
North East Fife	FIF	SCT	Con	LD	19,430	46.4%	3,308	77.8%	16,122	2,319	19,430	3,589			294				85	41,839
North Hertfordshire	HRT	E	Con	Con	33,679	49.8%	16,531	84.4%	33,679	16,449	17,148								339	67,615
North Norfolk	NFK	E	Con	Con	28,810	48.3%	12,545	80.8%	28,810	13,850	16,265				559				167	59,651
North Tayside	AGS	SCT	Con	Con	20,283	46.7%	3,995	77.6%	20,283	3,094	3,791	16,288								43,456
North Thanet	KNT	SE	Con	Con	30,867	57.2%	18,210	76.0%	30,867	12,657	9,563				873					53,960
North Warwickshire	WAR	WM	Con	Lab	27,599	46.1%	1,454	82.8%	26,145	27,599	6,167									59,862
Durham West North	DUR	NE	Lab	Lab	26,734	57.8%	13,987	75.5%	12,747	26,734	6,728									46,209
North West Hampshire	HAM	SE	Con	Con	34,310	58.1%	17,848	80.8%	34,310	7,433	16,462				825					59,030
North West Leicestershire	LEI	EM	Con	Con	28,379	45.5%	979	86.1%	28,379	27,400	6,353								229	62,361
North West Norfolk	NFK	E	Con	Con	32,554	52.1%	11,564	80.7%	32,554	20,990	8,599								330	62,473
North West Surrey	SRY	SE	Con	Con	41,772	63.8%	28,394	78.3%	41,772	8,886	13,378				1,441					65,477
North Wiltshire	WIL	SW	Con	Con	39,028	55.6%	16,388	81.7%	39,028	6,945	22,640				850				688	70,151
Northampton North	NTH	EM	Con	Con	24,865	45.8%	3,908	78.5%	24,865	20,957	8,236								232	54,290
Northampton South	NTH	EM	Con	Con	36,882	55.3%	16,973	79.9%	36,882	19,909	9,912									66,703
Northavon	AVN	SW	Con	Con	35,338	50.3%	11,861	84.2%	35,338	10,290	23,477				789				380	70,274
Norwich North	NFK	E	Con	Con	22,419	43.3%	266	81.8%	22,419	22,153	6,706				433				93	51,804
Norwich South	NFK	E	Con	Lab	24,965	48.7%	6,181	80.6%	18,784	24,965	6,609				803				104	51,265
Norwood	LND	LND	Lab	Lab	18,391	53.2%	7,216	66.1%	11,175	18,391	4,087				790				138	34,581
Nottingham East	NTT	EM	Con	Lab	25,026	52.6%	7,680	70.1%	17,346	25,026	3,695				667				881	47,615
Nottingham North	NTT	EM	Lab	Lab	29,052	55.7%	10,743	75.0%	18,309	29,052	4,477								274	52,112
Nottingham South	NTT	EM	Con	Lab	25,771	47.7%	3,181	74.2%	22,590	25,771	5,408								263	54,032
Nuneaton	WAR	WM	Con	Lab	27,157	45.8%	1,631	83.0%	25,526	27,157	6,671									59,354
Ogmore	MGM	WLS	Lab	Lab	30,186	71.7%	23,827	80.6%	6,359	30,186	2,868					2,667				42,080
Old Bexley and Sidcup	LND	LND	Con	Con	24,450	60.3%	15,699	81.9%	24,450	8,751	6,438								881	40,520
Oldham Central and Royton	GTM	NW	Lab	Lab	23,246	51.1%	8,606	74.2%	14,640	23,246	7,224								403	45,513
Oldham West	GTM	NW	Lab	Lab	21,580	52.8%	8,333	75.6%	13,247	21,580	5,525								551	40,903
Orkney and Shetland	HLD	SCT	Lib	LD	9,575	46.4%	5,033	65.5%	4,542	4,093	9,575	2,301							115	20,626
Orpington	LND	LND	Con	Con	27,421	57.2%	12,935	83.7%	27,421	5,512	14,486								539	47,958
Oxford East	OXF	SE	Lab	Lab	23,702	50.4%	7,538	74.6%	16,164	23,702	6,105				933				149	47,053
Oxford West and Abingdon	OXF	SE	Con	Con	25,163	45.4%	3,539	76.7%	25,163	7,652	21,624				660				367	55,466
Paisley North	RFW	SCT	Lab	Lab	17,269	50.7%	9,329	73.4%	5,576	17,269	2,779	7,940			412				81	34,057
Paisley South	RFW	SCT	Lab	Lab	18,202	50.7%	9,549	75.0%	5,703	18,202	3,271	8,653							93	35,922
Peckham	LND	LND	Lab	Lab	19,391	61.8%	12,005	53.8%	7,386	19,391	4,331								286	31,394
Pembrokeshire	DFD	WLS	Con	Lab	26,253	43.3%	755	82.9%	25,498	26,253	6,625				484	1,627			158	60,645
Pendle	LAN	NW	Con	Lab	23,497	44.2%	2,113	82.9%	21,384	23,497	7,976								263	53,120
Penrith and The Border	CMA	NW	Con	Con	33,808	57.5%	18,449	79.7%	33,808	8,871	15,359				610				129	58,777
Perth and Kinross	PAK	SCT	Con	Con	20,195	40.2%	2,094	76.9%	20,195	6,267	5,714	18,101								47,950
Peterborough	CAM	E	Con	Con	31,827	48.3%	5,376	75.1%	31,827	26,451	5,208								2,354	65,840
Plymouth Devonport	DEV	SW	SDP	Lab	24,953	48.7%	7,412	77.8%	17,541	24,953	6,315								2,407	51,216
Plymouth Drake	DEV	SW	Con	Con	17,075	43.7%	2,013	75.6%	17,075	15,062	5,893				441				571	39,042
Plymouth Sutton	DEV	SW	Con	Con	27,070	49.5%	11,950	81.2%	27,070	15,120	12,291								256	54,737
Pontefract and Castleford	WYK	YTH	Lab	Lab	33,546	69.9%	23,495	74.3%	10,051	33,546	4,410									48,007
Pontypridd	GNT	WLS	Lab	Lab	29,722	60.8%	19,797	79.3%	9,925	29,722	4,180				615	4,448				48,890
Poole	DOR	SW	Con	Con	33,445	53.2%	12,831	79.4%	33,445	6,912	20,614								1,923	62,894
Portsmouth North	HAM	SE	Con	Con	32,240	52.6%	13,881	77.1%	32,240	18,359	10,101				628					61,328
Portsmouth South	HAM	SE	Con	Con	22,798	42.5%	242	69.1%	22,798	7,857	22,556				349				91	53,651
Preston	LAN	NW	Lab	Lab	24,983	54.3%	12,175	71.7%	12,808	24,983	7,897								341	46,029
Pudsey	WYK	YTH	Con	Con	25,067	44.2%	8,972	80.1%	25,067	16,095	15,153				466					56,781
Putney	LND	LND	Con	Con	25,188	52.2%	7,526	77.9%	25,188	17,662	4,636				618				139	48,243
Ravensbourne	LND	LND	Con	Con	29,506	63.4%	19,714	81.2%	29,506	6,182	9,792				617				423	46,520
Reading East	BRK	SE	Con	Con	29,148	53.8%	14,555	75.0%	29,148	14,593	9,528				861					54,130
Reading West	BRK	SE	Con	Con	28,048	52.9%	13,298	78.0%	28,048	14,750	9,572				613					52,983
Redcar	CLV	NE	Lab	Lab	27,184	56.0%	11,577	77.7%	15,607	27,184	5,789									48,580
Reigate	SRY	SE	Con	Con	32,220	57.1%	17,664	78.5%	32,220	9,150	14,556								513	56,449
Renfrew West and Inverclyde	RFW	SCT	Con	Lab	17,085	36.6%	1,744	80.3%	15,341	17,085	4,668	9,444							149	46,687
Rhondda	MGM	WLS	Lab	Lab	34,243	74.5%	28,816	76.6%	3,588	34,243	2,431					5,427			245	45,934
Ribble Valley	LAN	NW	Con	Con	29,178	52.4%	6,542	85.0%	29,178	3,649	22,636									55,727
Richmond and Barnes	LND	LND	Con	Con	22,894	50.7%	3,869	84.9%	22,894	2,632	19,025				376				198	45,125
Richmond (Yorks)	NYK	YTH	Con	Con	40,202	61.9%	23,504	78.4%	40,202	7,523	16,698								570	64,993
Rochdale	GTM	NW	Lib	LD	22,776	42.8%	1,839	76.5%	8,626	20,937	22,776								841	53,180
Rochford	ESS	E	Con	Con	38,967	61.1%	26,036	83.0%	38,967	10,537	12,931								1,362	63,797
Romford	LND	LND	Con	Con	23,834	56.6%	11,420	78.0%	23,834	12,414	5,329				546					42,123
Romsey and Waterside	HAM	SE	Con	Con	37,375	54.4%	15,304	83.2%	37,375	8,688	22,071				577					68,711
Ross, Cromarty and Skye	HLD	SCT	SDP	LD	17,066	41.6%	7,630	73.6%	9,436	6,275	17,066	7,618			642					41,037
Rossendale and Darwen	LAN	NW	Con	Lab	28,028	43.9%	120	83.0%	27,908	28,028	7,226				596				125	63,883
Rother Valley	SYK	YTH	Lab	Lab	30,977	60.5%	17,222	75.0%	13,755	30,977	6,483									51,215
Rotherham	SYK	YTH	Lab	Lab	27,933	63.9%	17,561	71.7%	10,372	27,933	5,375									43,680
Roxburgh and Berwickshire	STB	SCT	Lib	LD	15,852	46.9%	4,257	77.6%	11,595	2,909	15,852	3,437								33,793
Rugby and Kenilworth	WAR	WM	Con	Con	34,110	52.4%	13,248	83.7%	34,110	20,862	9,934								202	65,108
Ruislip-Northwood	LND	LND	Con	Con	28,097	63.3%	19,791	82.1%	28,097	8,306	7,739								214	44,356
Rushcliffe	NTT	EM	Con	Con	34,448	54.4%	19,766	83.0%	34,448	14,682	12,660				775				761	63,326
Rutland and Melton	LIN	EM	Con	Con	38,603	59.0%	25,535	80.8%	38,603	13,068	12,682				861				237	65,451
Ryedale	NYK	YTH	Con	Con	39,888	56.1%	18,439	81.7%	39,888	9,812	21,449									71,149
Saffron Walden	ESS	E	Con	Con	35,272	56.6%	17,424	83.2%	35,272	8,933	17,848								260	62,313
Salford East	GTM	NW	Lab	Lab	20,327	60.0%	11,235	64.4%	9,092	20,327	3,836				463				150	33,868
Salisbury	WIL	SW	Con	Con	31,546	52.0%	8,973	79.9%	31,546	5,483	22,573				609				443	60,654
Scarborough	NYK	YTH	Con	Con	29,334	49.8%	11,734	77.2%	29,334	17,600	11,133				876					58,943
Sedgefield	DUR	NE	Lab	Lab	28,453	60.5%	14,859	77.1%	13,594	28,453	4,982									47,029
Selby	NYK	YTH	Con	Con	31,067	50.2%	9,508	80.2%	31,067	21,559	9,244									61,870
Sevenoaks	KNT	SE	Con	Con	33,245	57.5%	19,154	81.3%	33,245	9,470	14,091				786				210	57,802
Sheffield Attercliffe	SYK	YTH	Lab	Lab	28,563	57.5%	15,480	71.8%	13,083	28,563	7,283				751					49,680
Sheffield Brightside	SYK	YTH	Lab	Lab	29,771	70.4%	22,681	66.3%	7,090	29,771	5,273								150	42,224
Sheffield Central	SYK	YTH	Lab	Lab	22,764	68.7%	17,294	56.1%	5,470	22,764	3,856				750				304	33,144
Sheffield Hallam	SYK	YTH	Con	Con	24,693	45.5%	6,741	70.8%	24,693	10,930	17,952				473				200	54,248
Sheffield Helley	SYK	YTH	Lab	Lab	28,005	55.7%	14,954	70.9%	13,051	28,005	9,247									50,303
Sheffield Hillsborough	SYK	YTH	Lab	Lab	27,568	46.2%	7,068	77.2%	11,640	27,568	20,500									59,708
Sherwood	NTT	EM	Con	Lab	29,788	47.5%	2,910	85.5%	26,878	29,788	6,039									62,705
Shipley	WYK	YTH	Con	Con	28,463	50.4%	12,382	82.1%	28,463	16,081	11,288				680					56,512
Shoreham	WSX	SE	Con	Con	32,670	56.5%	14,286	81.2%	32,670	6,123	18,384								659	57,836
Shrewsbury and Atcham	SPS	WM	Con	Con	26,681	45.8%	10,965	82.5%	26,681	15,157	15,716				677					58,231
Shropshire North	SPS	WM	Con	Con	32,443	50.5%	16,211	77.7%	32,443	15,550	16,232									64,225
Skipton and Ripon	NYK	YTH	Con	Con	35,937	58.4%	19,330	81.3%	35,937	8,978	16,607									61,522
Slough	BRK	SE	Con	Con	25,793	44.6%	514	78.0%	25,793	25,279	4,041								2,702	57,815
Solihull	WMD	WM	Con	Con	38,385	60.8%	25,146	81.6%	38,385	10,544	13,239				925					63,093
Somerton and Frome	SOM	SW	Con	Con	28,052	47.5%	4,341	82.7%	28,052	6,154	23,711				742				388	59,047
South Antrim	NIR	NIR	UUP	UUP	29,956	70.9%	24,559	62.9%					29,956	5,397				1,220	5,686	42,259
South Colchester and Maldon	ESS	E	Con	Con	37,548	54.8%	21,821	79.2%	37,548	14,158	15,727				1,028					68,461
South Derbyshire	DBY	EM	Con	Con	34,266	48.7%	4,658	84.7%	34,266	29,608	6,236								291	70,401
South Down	NIR	NIR	SDLP	SDLP	31,523	51.2%	6,342	80.9%	1,488				25,181	31,523				1,843	1,542	61,577
South East Cambridgeshire	CAM	E	Con	Con	36,693	57.9%	23,810	80.6%	36,693	12,688	12,883				836				231	63,331
South East Cornwall	CUL	SW	Con	Con	30,565	51.0%	7,704	82.1%	30,565	5,536	22,861								1,026	59,988
South Hams	DEV	SW	Con	Con	35,951	53.4%	13,711	81.0%	35,951	8,091	22,240				846				227	67,355
South Norfolk	NFK	E	Con	Con	36,081	52.6%	17,565	84.0%	36,081	12,422	18,516				702				856	68,577
South Ribble	LAN	NW	Con	Con	30,828	47.5%	5,973	83.0%	30,828	24,855	8,928								269	64,880
South Shields	TWR	NE	Lab	Lab	24,876	59.8%	13,477	70.1%	11,399	24,876	5,344									41,619
South Staffordshire	STS	WM	Con	Con	40,266	59.7%	22,633	81.5%	40,266	17,633	9,584									67,483
South Suffolk	SFK	E	Con	Con	34,793	50.2%	17,289	81.7%	34,793	16,623	17,504								420	69,340
South Thanet	KNT	SE	Con	Con	25,253	51.7%	11,513	78.2%	25,253	13,740	8,948				871					48,812
South West Bedfordshire	BDF	E	Con	Con	37,498	57.1%	21,273	81.9%	37,498	16,225	10,988				689				239	65,639
South West Cambridgeshire	CAM	E	Con	Con	38,902	56.8%	19,637	81.1%	38,902	9,378	19,263				699				225	68,467
South West Hertfordshire	HRT	E	Con	Con	33,825	57.0%	20,107	83.7%	33,825	11,512	13,718								281	59,336
South West Norfolk	NFK	E	Con	Con	33,637	54.6%	16,931	79.3%	33,637	16,706	11,237									61,580
South West Surrey	SRY	SE	Con	Con	35,008	58.5%	14,975	82.8%	35,008	3,840	20,033				710				245	59,836
South Worcestershire	WOR	WM	Con	Con	34,792	54.1%	16,151	80.3%	34,792	9,727	18,641				1,178					64,338
Southampton Itchen	HAM	SE	Con	Lab	24,402	44.0%	551	76.9%	23,851	24,402	7,221									55,474
Southampton Test	HAM	SE	Con	Con	24,504	43.4%	585	77.4%	24,504	23,919	7,391				535				101	56,450
Southend East	ESS	E	Con	Con	24,591	58.8%	13,111	73.8%	24,591	11,480	5,107								673	41,851
Southend West	ESS	E	Con	Con	27,319	54.7%	11,902	77.8%	27,319	6,139	15,417				451				622	49,948
Southport	MSY	NW	Lib	Con	26,081	47.0%	3,063	77.6%	26,081	5,637	23,018				545				159	55,440
Southwark and Bermondsey	LND	LND	Lib	LD	21,459	56.9%	9,845	62.6%	3,794	11,614	21,459								867	37,734
Spelthorne	SRY	SE	Con	Con	32,627	58.6%	19,843	80.4%	32,627	12,784	9,702				580				533	55,726
St Albans	HRT	E	Con	Con	32,709	52.8%	16,404	83.5%	32,709	12,016	16,305				734				161	61,925
St Helens North	MSY	NW	Lab	Lab	31,930	57.9%	16,244	77.4%	15,686	31,930	7,224								287	55,127
St Helens South	MSY	NW	Lab	Lab	30,391	61.0%	18,209	73.8%	12,182	30,391	6,933								295	49,801
St Ives	CUL	SW	Con	Con	24,528	42.9%	1,645	80.3%	24,528	9,144	22,883								577	57,132
Stafford	STS	WM	Con	Con	30,876	49.9%	10,900	82.9%	30,876	19,976	10,702								354	61,908
Staffordshire Moorlands	STS	WM	Con	Con	29,240	46.6%	7,410	83.7%	29,240	21,830	9,326								2,382	62,778
Staffordshire South East	STS	WM	Con	Con	29,180	50.7%	7,192	82.0%	29,180	21,988	5,540								895	57,603
Stalybridge and Hyde	GTM	NW	Lab	Lab	26,207	52.3%	8,831	73.5%	17,376	26,207	4,740								1,774	50,097
Stamford and Spalding	LIN	EM	Con	Con	35,965	59.0%	22,869	81.2%	35,965	13,096	11,939									61,000
Stevenage	HRT	E	Con	Con	26,652	45.7%	4,888	83.0%	26,652	21,764	9,668								233	58,317
Stirling	SRG	SCT	Con	Con	19,174	40.0%	703	82.3%	19,174	18,471	3,337	6,558			342				68	47,950
Stockport	GTM	NW	Con	Lab	21,096	44.1%	1,422	82.3%	19,674	21,096	6,539				436				50	47,795
Stockton North	CLV	NE	Lab	Lab	27,918	52.3%	10,474	76.8%	17,444	27,918	7,454								550	53,366
Stockton South	CLV	NE	Con	Con	28,418	45.2%	3,369	82.8%	28,418	25,049	9,410									62,877
Stoke-on-Trent Central	STS	WM	Lab	Lab	25,897	58.0%	13,420	68.1%	14,277	25,897	6,073								196	44,643
Stoke-on-Trent North	STS	WM	Lab	Lab	30,464	56.7%	14,777	73.4%	15,687	30,464	7,167								387	53,705
Stoke-on-Trent South	STS	WM	Lab	Lab	26,380	49.8%	6,909	74.3%	19,471	26,380	6,870								291	53,012
Strangford	NIR	NIR	UUP	UUP	19,517	43.6%	8,911	65.0%	6,782				19,517				10,606		7,880	44,785
Stratford-on-Avon	WAR	WM	Con	Con	40,251	59.2%	22,892	82.1%	40,251	8,932	17,359				729				703	67,974
Strathkelvin and Bearsden	EDB	SCT	Lab	Lab	21,267	42.2%	3,162	82.2%	18,105	21,267	4,585	6,275							90	50,322
Streatham	LND	LND	Con	Lab	18,925	47.0%	2,317	70.8%	16,608	18,925	3,858				443				396	40,230
Stretford	GTM	NW	Lab	Lab	22,300	59.6%	11,137	68.8%	11,163	22,300	3,722								268	37,453
Stroud	GLS	SW	Con	Con	32,201	46.2%	13,405	84.5%	32,201	18,796	16,751				2,005					69,753
Suffolk Central	SFK	E	Con	Con	32,917	49.6%	16,031	80.3%	32,917	15,615	16,886				800				190	66,408
Suffolk Coastal	SFK	E	Con	Con	34,680	53.6%	19,285	81.6%	34,680	13,508	15,395				943				232	64,758
Sunderland North	TWR	NE	Lab	Lab	30,481	60.7%	17,004	68.9%	13,477	30,481	5,389								841	50,188
Sunderland South	TWR	NE	Lab	Lab	29,399	57.9%	14,501	69.9%	14,898	29,399	5,844				596					50,737
Surbiton	LND	LND	Con	Con	19,033	54.4%	9,639	82.4%	19,033	6,384	9,394								161	34,972
Sutton and Cheam	LND	LND	Con	Con	27,710	55.2%	10,756	82.4%	27,710	4,980	16,954				444				133	50,221
Sutton Coldfield	WMD	WM	Con	Con	37,001	65.2%	26,036	79.5%	37,001	8,490	10,965								324	56,780
Swansea East	WGM	WLS	Lab	Lab	31,179	69.7%	23,482	75.6%	7,697	31,179	4,248					1,607				44,731
Swansea West	WGM	WLS	Lab	Lab	23,238	53.0%	9,478	73.3%	13,760	23,238	4,620				564	1,668				43,850
Swindon	WIL	SW	Con	Con	31,749	43.3%	2,826	81.5%	31,749	28,923	11,737				647				314	73,370
Tatton	CHS	NW	Con	Con	31,658	55.1%	15,860	80.8%	31,658	15,798	9,597								410	57,463
Taunton	SOM	SW	Con	Con	29,576	46.0%	3,336	82.3%	29,576	8,151	26,240								279	64,246
Teignbridge	DEV	SW	Con	Con	31,274	50.0%	8,858	82.4%	31,274	8,128	22,416								671	62,489
The Wrekin	SPS	WM	Lab	Lab	33,865	48.3%	6,648	77.1%	27,217	33,865	8,032				1,008					70,122
Thurrock	ESS	E	Con	Lab	24,791	45.9%	1,172	78.1%	23,619	24,791	5,145								508	54,063
Tiverton	DEV	SW	Con	Con	30,376	51.5%	11,089	83.3%	30,376	5,950	19,287				1,007				2,321	58,941
Tonbridge and Malling	KNT	SE	Con	Con	36,542	57.2%	21,558	82.7%	36,542	11,533	14,984				612				221	63,892
Tooting	LND	LND	Lab	Lab	24,601	48.2%	4,107	74.8%	20,494	24,601	3,776				694				1,523	51,088
Torbay	DEV	SW	Con	Con	28,624	49.9%	5,787	80.6%	28,624	5,503	22,837								425	57,389
Torfaen	GNT	WLS	Lab	Lab	30,352	64.1%	20,754	77.5%	9,598	30,352	6,178					1,210				47,338
Torridge and West Devon	DEV	SW	Con	Con	29,627	47.3%	3,614	81.5%	29,627	5,997	26,013				898				141	62,676
Tottenham	LND	LND	Lab	Lab	25,309	56.5%	11,698	65.6%	13,341	25,309	5,120				903				150	44,823
Truro	CUL	SW	Lib	LD	31,230	50.5%	7,570	82.3%	23,660	6,078	31,230				569				316	61,853
Tunbridge Wells	KNT	SE	Con	Con	34,162	56.9%	17,132	78.1%	34,162	8,300	17,030								503	59,995
Tweeddale, Ettrick and Lauderdale	DFG	SCT	Lib	LD	12,296	39.9%	2,520	78.0%	9,776	3,328	12,296	5,244							177	30,821
Twickenham	LND	LND	Con	Con	26,804	50.4%	5,711	84.2%	26,804	4,919	21,093								340	53,156
Tyne Bridge	TWR	NE	Lab	Lab	22,328	67.2%	15,210	62.6%	7,118	22,328	3,804									33,250
Tynemouth	TWR	NE	Con	Con	27,731	46.0%	597	80.4%	27,731	27,134	4,855				543					60,263
Upminster	LND	LND	Con	Con	28,791	55.8%	13,821	80.5%	28,791	14,970	7,848									51,609
Upper Bann	NIR	NIR	UUP	UUP	26,824	59.0%	16,163	67.4%	1,556				26,824	10,661				2,777	3,661	45,479
Uxbridge	LND	LND	Con	Con	27,487	56.5%	13,179	78.9%	27,487	14,308	5,900				538				470	48,703
Vale of Glamorgan	SGM	WLS	Con	Con	24,220	44.3%	19	81.9%	24,220	24,201	5,045					1,160				54,626
Vauxhall	LND	LND	Lab	Lab	21,328	54.8%	10,488	62.4%	10,840	21,328	5,678				803				308	38,957
Wakefield	WYK	YTH	Lab	Lab	26,964	50.6%	6,590	76.2%	20,374	26,964	5,900									53,238
Wallasey	MRY	NW	Con	Lab	26,531	48.9%	3,809	82.6%	22,722	26,531	4,177				680				105	54,215
Wallsend	TWR	NE	Lab	Lab	33,439	57.9%	19,470	74.1%	13,969	33,439	10,369									57,777
Walsall North	WMD	WM	Lab	Lab	24,387	46.7%	3,824	75.0%	20,563	24,387	6,629								614	52,193
Walsall South	WMD	WM	Lab	Lab	24,133	48.2%	3,178	76.3%	20,955	24,133	4,132				673				167	50,060
Walthamstow	LND	LND	Con	Lab	16,251	45.7%	3,022	72.4%	13,229	16,251	5,142								241	34,863
Wansbeck	NBL	NE	Lab	Lab	30,046	59.7%	18,174	79.3%	11,872	30,046	7,691				710					50,319
Wansdyke	SOM	SW	Con	Con	31,389	48.2%	13,341	84.2%	31,389	18,048	14,834				800					65,071
Wanstead and Woodford	LND	LND	Con	Con	26,204	60.0%	16,885	78.3%	26,204	9,319	7,362				637				178	43,700
Wantage	OXF	SE	Con	Con	30,575	54.1%	16,473	82.7%	30,575	10,955	14,102				867					56,499
Warley East	WMD	WM	Lab	Lab	19,891	53.6%	7,794	71.7%	12,097	19,891	4,547								561	37,096
Warley West	WMD	WM	Lab	Lab	21,386	50.6%	5,472	73.9%	15,914	21,386	4,945									42,245
Warrington North	CHS	NW	Lab	Lab	33,019	54.3%	12,622	77.3%	20,397	33,019	6,965								400	60,781
Warrington South	CHS	NW	Con	Lab	27,819	43.6%	191	82.0%	27,628	27,819	7,978								321	63,746
Warwick and Leamington	WAR	WM	Con	Con	28,093	48.4%	8,935	81.6%	28,093	19,158	9,645				803				407	58,106
Watford	HRT	E	Con	Con	29,072	48.8%	9,590	82.3%	29,072	19,482	10,231				566				176	59,527
Waveney	SFK	E	Con	Con	33,174	48.2%	6,702	81.8%	33,174	26,472	8,925								302	68,873
Wealden	SXE	SE	Con	Con	37,263	61.7%	20,931	81.0%	37,263	5,579	16,332				1,002				182	60,358
Wellingborough	NTH	EM	Con	Con	32,302	53.4%	11,816	81.9%	32,302	20,486	7,714									60,502
Wells	SOM	SW	Con	Con	28,620	49.6%	6,649	82.7%	28,620	6,126	21,971				1,042					57,759
Welwyn Hatfield	HRT	E	Con	Con	29,447	48.4%	8,465	84.3%	29,447	20,982	10,196								264	60,889
Wentworth	SYK	YTH	Lab	Lab	32,939	68.5%	22,449	74.0%	10,490	32,939	4,629									48,058
West Derbyshire	DBY	EM	Con	Con	32,879	54.3%	18,769	85.0%	32,879	13,528	14,110									60,517
West Gloucestershire	GLS	SW	Con	Con	29,232	43.6%	4,958	83.9%	29,232	24,274	13,366								247	67,119
West Hertfordshire	HRT	E	Con	Con	33,340	51.5%	14,924	82.4%	33,340	19,400	10,464				674				840	64,718
West Lancashire	LAN	NW	Con	Lab	30,128	47.1%	2,077	82.6%	28,051	30,128	4,884				546				336	63,945
West Bromwich East	WMD	WM	Lab	Lab	19,913	46.2%	2,813	75.7%	17,100	19,913	5,630								477	43,120
West Bromwich West	WMD	WM	Lab	Lab	22,251	54.8%	7,830	70.4%	14,421	22,251	3,925									40,597
Westbury	WIL	SW	Con	Con	36,568	50.4%	12,618	82.8%	36,568	9,642	23,950				888				1,440	72,488
Western Isles	WEI	SCT	Lab	Lab	7,664	47.8%	1,703	70.4%	1,362	7,664	552	5,961							491	16,030
Westminster North	LND	LND	Con	Con	21,828	49.0%	3,733	75.1%	21,828	18,095	3,349				1,017				296	44,585
Westmorland and Lonsdale	CMA	NW	Con	Con	31,798	56.9%	16,436	77.8%	31,798	8,436	15,362								287	55,883
Weston-super-Mare	SOM	SW	Con	Con	30,022	47.7%	5,342	79.7%	30,022	6,913	24,680				1,262					62,877
Wigan	GTM	NW	Lab	Lab	34,910	63.0%	21,842	76.2%	13,068	34,910	6,111								1,313	55,402
Wimbledon	LND	LND	Con	Con	26,331	53.0%	14,761	80.2%	26,331	11,570	10,569				860				351	49,681
Winchester	HAM	SE	Con	Con	33,113	50.1%	8,121	83.2%	33,113	4,917	24,992								3,095	66,117
Windsor and Maidenhead	BRK	SE	Con	Con	35,075	55.5%	12,928	81.6%	35,075	4,975	22,147				510				454	63,161
Wirral South	MSY	NW	Con	Con	25,590	50.8%	8,183	82.4%	25,590	17,407	6,581				584				182	50,344
Wirral West	MSY	NW	Con	Con	26,852	52.7%	11,064	81.6%	26,852	15,788	7,420				700				188	50,948
Witney	OXF	SE	Con	Con	36,256	56.4%	22,568	81.9%	36,256	13,688	13,393				716				253	64,306
Woking	SRY	SE	Con	Con	37,744	58.9%	19,842	79.2%	37,744	8,080	17,902								302	64,028
Wokingham	BRK	SE	Con	Con	43,497	61.4%	25,709	81.8%	43,497	8,846	17,788								679	70,810
Wolverhampton North East	WMD	WM	Con	Lab	24,106	49.3%	3,939	78.0%	20,167	24,106	3,546								1,087	48,906
Wolverhampton South East	WMD	WM	Lab	Lab	23,215	56.7%	10,240	72.9%	12,975	23,215	3,881								850	40,921
Wolverhampton South West	WMD	WM	Con	Con	25,969	49.3%	4,966	78.2%	25,969	21,003	4,470								1,237	52,679
Woodspring	SOM	SW	Con	Con	35,175	54.5%	17,509	83.2%	35,175	9,942	17,666				801				936	64,520
Woolwich	LND	LND	SDP	Lab	17,551	44.2%	2,225	70.9%	6,598	17,551									15,546	39,695
Worcester	WOR	WM	Con	Con	27,883	46.4%	6,152	81.0%	27,883	21,731	9,561				592				343	60,110
Workington	CMA	NW	Lab	Lab	26,719	56.9%	10,449	81.5%	16,270	26,719	3,028								938	46,955
Worsley	GTM	NW	Lab	Lab	29,418	52.4%	10,012	77.7%	19,406	29,418	6,490				677				176	56,167
Worthing	WSX	SE	Con	Con	34,198	57.0%	16,533	77.4%	34,198	6,679	17,665				806				679	60,027
Wrexham	CLY	WLS	Lab	Lab	24,830	48.3%	6,716	80.7%	18,114	24,830	7,074					1,415				51,433
Wycombe	BKM	SE	Con	Con	30,081	53.1%	17,076	78.0%	30,081	12,222	13,005				686				617	56,611
Wyre	LAN	NW	Con	Con	29,449	54.6%	11,664	79.5%	29,449	17,785	6,420								260	53,914
Wyre Forest	WOR	WM	Con	Con	28,983	47.8%	10,341	82.3%	28,983	18,642	12,958									60,583
Yeovil	SOM	SW	Lib	LD	30,958	51.7%	8,833	82.0%	22,125	5,765	30,958				639				408	59,895
Ynys Môn	GWN	WLS	Con	PC	15,984	37.1%	1,106	80.6%	14,878	10,126	1,891					15,984			182	43,061
York	NYK	YTH	Con	Lab	31,525	49.1%	6,342	81.0%	25,183	31,525	6,811				594				54	64,167
Total for all constituencies								77.7%	14,094,116	11,557,062	6,027,038	629,552	270,749	184,445	170,047	156,796	103,039	78,291	342,939	33,614,074
Total for all constituencies								77.7%	41.9%	34.4%	17.8%	1.9%	0.8%	0.5%	0.5%	0.5%	0.3%	0.2%	1.2%	100.0%
Total for all constituencies								77.7%	Seats											
Total for all constituencies								77.7%	336	271	20	3	9	4	0	4	3	0	1	651
Total for all constituencies								77.7%	51.6%	41.6%	3.1%	0.5%	1.4%	0.6%	0.0%	0.6%	0.5%	0.0%	0.2%	100.0%

== See also ==
- 1992 United Kingdom general election
- List of MPs elected in the 1992 United Kingdom general election
