= Michael Brotherton =

British journalist and politician

Member of Parliament for Louth, Lincolnshire
- In office 10 October 1974 – 9 June 1983
- Preceded by: Jeffrey Archer
- Succeeded by: constituency abolished

Personal details
- Born: 26 May 1931 (age 95)
- Party: Conservative
- Education: Royal Naval College
- Military career
- Allegiance: United Kingdom
- Branch: Navy
- Rank: Lieutenant-Commander

Michael Lewis "Lou" Brotherton (born 26 May 1931) is a British journalist and politician. A Conservative, he had a promising Parliamentary career and worked as a Parliamentary consultant after his former constituency in Lincolnshire was abolished in boundary changes in 1983.

== Royal Navy career ==
The son of a brewer, and brought up in the Roman Catholic faith, Brotherton went to Prior Park College. He enlisted in the Royal Navy and continued his education at the Royal Naval College in Dartmouth, qualifying as an Observer in 1955. He served in Cyprus in 1957 during a flare-up in communal conflicts and was mentioned in dispatches for distinguished conduct. Brotherton left the Navy after achieving the rank of lieutenant-commander in 1964.

== Early political activity ==
Retraining as an advertising executive, Brotherton joined Times Newspapers in 1967. He also became politically active in the Conservative Party, speaking at the Party conference of 1966 in support of building an aircraft carrier for the Navy, and was chairman of Beckenham Conservative Political Centre for the year 1967–1968. At the 1970 general election, he was the unsuccessful Conservative candidate in Deptford.

== October 1974 election ==
Failing to find a seat for the February 1974 general election, Brotherton became more prominent during the short interval between elections that year. He attacked the Labour government's decision to write off the debt of the National Coal Board. When Jeffrey Archer suddenly announced his decision to stand down from Parliament due to financial problems, Brotherton was selected as the candidate for Louth in the October 1974 general election. Brotherton won the seat but, in terms of swing, the result was one of the worst for the Conservatives in the election, attributed to the circumstances in which Archer left and the short time Brotherton had to make himself known.

== Policy positions ==
Once in Parliament, Brotherton used the platform it gave him to express his views in somewhat forceful terms. During the Common Market referendum of 1975, Brotherton strongly attacked Edward du Cann who made a last minute anti-Market speech; Brotherton declared that du Cann "requires either psychiatric treatment or lessons in simple arithmetic".

Brotherton demanded that the Royal Navy escort the British fishing fleet to defend it from Icelandic attacks during the Cod War. Early in January 1976 he challenged James Callaghan, then Foreign Secretary, to substantiate Sheila Cassidy's claim that she had been tortured in Chile before making any protest to the Chilean government. In March 1976, he pressed the issue of a member of the House of Commons catering staff who had been found to be a supporter of the Provisional Irish Republican Army, calling for stricter vetting.

A strong supporter of Margaret Thatcher, Brotherton urged Edward Heath not to make public criticisms of her. In 1977, he successfully moved a private member's motion that declared the House would not welcome Idi Amin's presence at the Commonwealth Heads of Government Conference. He was also a supporter of Ian Smith in Rhodesia, and urged the government not to make a deal with the "terrorists", including Robert Mugabe.

== Under the Thatcher government ==
Brotherton supported the call for a boycott of the 1980 Moscow Olympics, and voted against a rise in petrol duty which was proposed by Geoffrey Howe in the 1981 budget. He was placed on the Select Committee on the Contempt of Court Bill in 1981 as one of the few non-lawyers; he supported an amendment to allow unrestricted tape-recording of court proceedings, against government advice. He also opposed the 1981 Defence Review, with its proposed reductions in the Royal Navy. In March 1982, when the Adam Smith Institute rated MPs according to their tendency to vote for individual freedom, Brotherton and his Parliamentary neighbour Michael Brown topped the list.

In December 1982, Brotherton (a strong opponent of wasteful spending) was embarrassed when he missed a rail connection and then asked three police cars to drive him from Newark-on-Trent to a charity event in Grimsby. The local Labour-controlled police authority questioned why it was so urgent for him to get there when he was not expected to attend (his wife was the guest of honour), and asked him to reimburse the cost. He was also twice convicted of driving offences in the early 1980s.

== 1983 election ==
At the 1983 general election, boundary changes merged most of his seat with Brigg and Scunthorpe to form a new Brigg and Cleethorpes; this pitched Brotherton into a contest with Michael Brown for the nomination, which Brown won in March 1983. The remainder of the area became part of the East Lindsey constituency, which adopted sitting Horncastle MP Sir Peter Tapsell. Brotherton then tried to find another constituency, but was unsuccessful.

== Later career ==
Brotherton kept up contacts in his old constituency and continued living in Lincolnshire. In 1986, he formed Michael Brotherton Associates, a company of Parliamentary consultants. He kept up his correspondence to newspapers, and was critical of the John Major government for giving concessions in European Union negotiations.

Parliament of the United Kingdom
Preceded by Jeffrey Archer	Member of Parliament for Louth; Oct 1974–1983	Constituency abolished
