= Michael Brown (British politician) =

British political journalist

Member of Parliament
- In office 3 May 1979 – 8 April 1997
- Preceded by: John Ellis
- Succeeded by: constituency abolished
- Constituency: Brigg and Scunthorpe (1979–1983); Brigg and Cleethorpes (1983–1997)

Personal details
- Born: 3 July 1951 (age 75)
- Party: Reform UK
- Other political affiliations: Conservative (until 2019)

Michael Russell Brown (born 3 July 1951) is a British political journalist, noted as a former Conservative Party Member of Parliament (MP) from 1979 to 1997.

== Early life ==
Brown was educated at the Andrew Cairns Secondary Modern School, Sussex, and the University of York, where he was friends with, and a contemporary of both Harvey Proctor and Christine Hamilton (née Holman). He was a member of Alcuin College and the York University Conservative Association.

After studying for a year at Middle Temple, he worked as a graduate management trainee for Barclays Bank from 1972 to 1974 then as a lecturer and tutor at Swinton Conservative College from 1974 to 1975.

From 1975 to 1976, he was a part-time research assistant to Michael Marshall MP, working for Nicholas Winterton MP from 1976 to 1979.

== Westminster ==
Brown was selected for the marginal constituency of Brigg and Scunthorpe and was elected at the 1979 general election. In 1983, following favourable boundary changes, he was elected for the new seat of Brigg and Cleethorpes. This followed a bitter selection battle between Brown and Michael Brotherton, who was MP for the Louth constituency, which included the towns of Immingham and Cleethorpes.

Brown threatened to resign from parliament when the village of North Killingholme, in the centre of his constituency was marked as a potential site for nuclear dumping.

Brown served as Parliamentary Private Secretary to Douglas Hogg, Minister of State at the Department of Trade and Industry, from 1989 to 1990, and then at the Foreign and Commonwealth Office from 1990 to 1992. From 1992 to 1993 he was a Parliamentary Private Secretary to Patrick Mayhew, Secretary of State for Northern Ireland. He was appointed as an Assistant Government Whip in 1993.

=== Right-wing activity ===
Brown was involved in the right-wing Conservative circles including the Monday Club and the Eldon League. Brown was a founding member of the No Turning Back group which included Michael Portillo, Peter Lilley and Neil Hamilton. Brown regarded Portillo as one of his closest friends in the early years of the 1980s claiming, "we hit it off right away." He accompanied Portillo on holidays with other friends including Derek Laud.

=== Southern Africa ===
Brown was a supporter of South Africa's ruling National Party during apartheid and visited that country with Neil Hamilton on a trip financed by the South African authorities in February 1988. Hamilton went on more than one tour of South Africa.

In 1990, Brown's protégé Derek Laud became active in support of the Democratic Turnhalle Alliance (DTA), a political party in Namibia backed by the South African government. Laud formed a lobbying group known as Strategy Network International, which lobbied vigorously on behalf of the DTA and later, the National Union for the Total Independence of Angola (UNITA).

=== Cash for questions affair ===
During his parliamentary career, Andrew Roth's Parliamentary Profiles described Brown as "an assiduous free tripper who repays his hosts". During the Cash for Questions parliamentary scandal, Brown admitted to, and apologised for, accepting money to lobby on behalf of US Tobacco without declaring it. He was alleged to have received £6,000 from Ian Greer Associates to lobby on behalf of US Tobacco, and to have failed to declare it in the Register of Members' Interests or to ministers.

He was further alleged to have not declared the income from Ian Greer Associates until the payments became publicly known.

The Parliamentary investigation found that Brown failed to register an introduction payment from Mr Greer on behalf of US Tobacco and that he "persistently and deliberately" failed to declare an interest in Skoal Bandits in his dealings with ministers over the issue. He did not immediately declare the payment to the Inland Revenue. Mr Brown also received a free flight to Connecticut to be briefed by the company, which he did record in the Register of Members' Interests.

=== Resignation ===
Brown resigned as an Assistant Whip in May 1994 after The News of the World published pictures of him on holiday in Barbados with a 20-year-old gay man. At the time, the age of consent for homosexual activity was 21, so the paper ran the story under the headline "Lawmaker as lawbreaker". After resigning, Brown subsequently acknowledged his homosexuality. The media linked Brown's resignation to Prime Minister John Major's ill-fated Back to Basics campaign.

== After Westminster ==
Brown lost the election for the new Cleethorpes seat at the general election on 1 May 1997. Initially he struggled to find employment, working for David Evans' contract cleaning firm (a fellow Conservative MP who had also lost his seat). In April 1998 he submitted a piece for The Independent on how he was looking forward to being canvassed by the Labour Party candidates for his area in the Westminster City Council elections, which would give him an opportunity to play the kind of tricks voters often play on election candidates.

The piece was published and was well received. It led to a regular commission as a political sketchwriter for The Independent starting in 1999, as well as political commentary for other newspapers. Today he regularly appears as a commentator and newspaper reviewer on British television, particularly on BBC News 24 and Sky News.

In April 2019, he joined Nigel Farage's Brexit Party but said that he is not planning on contesting elections.

Parliament of the United Kingdom
Preceded by John Ellis	Member of Parliament for Brigg and Scunthorpe; 1979–1983	Constituency abolished
New constituency	Member of Parliament for Brigg and Cleethorpes; 1983–1997	Constituency abolished
