= Michael Stern (British politician) =

Michael Charles Stern (born 3 August 1942) is a British Conservative Party politician. Stern contested Derby South at the 1979 general election before being elected as Member of Parliament (MP) for Bristol North West at the 1983 general election. He represented the seat for 14 years. In the 1992 election, he held on by the extremely narrow margin of 45 votes, but in 1997 — unhelped by adverse boundary changes — lost the seat to Labour's Doug Naysmith by 11,382 votes.

Parliament of the United Kingdom
Preceded by Michael Colvin	Member of Parliament for Bristol North West; 1983–1997	Succeeded by Doug Naysmith
