= Martin McLaren =

British soldier and Conservative Party politician

Major Martin John McLaren (11 January 1914 – 27 July 1979) was a British soldier and Conservative Party politician.

He was the son of Hon. Francis McLaren, Liberal MP for Spalding and Barbara Jekyll.

== Career ==
McLaren obtained a BA from the University of Oxford in 1936, and an MA in 1941. Joining the Grenadier Guards, he rose to the rank of Major during World War II.

After the war, he held a position in the Home Office until 1947, and in 1948 became a barrister of the Middle Temple. He entered Parliament at the 1959 general election as Conservative Member of Parliament (MP) for Bristol North West. In 1961 he became a government Assistant Whip, and in 1963 became a Lord Commissioner of the Treasury as a full Whip. In 1964, the Home government fell and he went into opposition. He lost his seat in the 1966 general election, recovered it in the 1970 election, and lost it again in October 1974, marking an end to his political career. In July 1970 he was appointed Parliamentary Private Secretary to the Foreign Secretary, Alec Douglas-Home.

== Family ==
On 18 September 1943, he married Nancy Ralston (1921-2020). The couple had three children:

- Rev. Richard Francis McLaren (9 November 1946 – 28 January 2022)
- Francis Andrew McLaren (5 August 1949 – 2 September 1960)
- Patrick Andrew McLaren (27 September 1963 – 14 December 1990)

Parliament of the United Kingdom
Preceded by Christopher Boyd	Member of Parliament for Bristol North West; 1959–1966	Succeeded by John Ellis
Preceded by John Ellis	Member of Parliament for Bristol North West; 1970–October 1974	Succeeded by Ronald Thomas
