= Ronald Thomas (politician) =

British politician (1929–2020)

The Right Honourable Ronald Richard Thomas
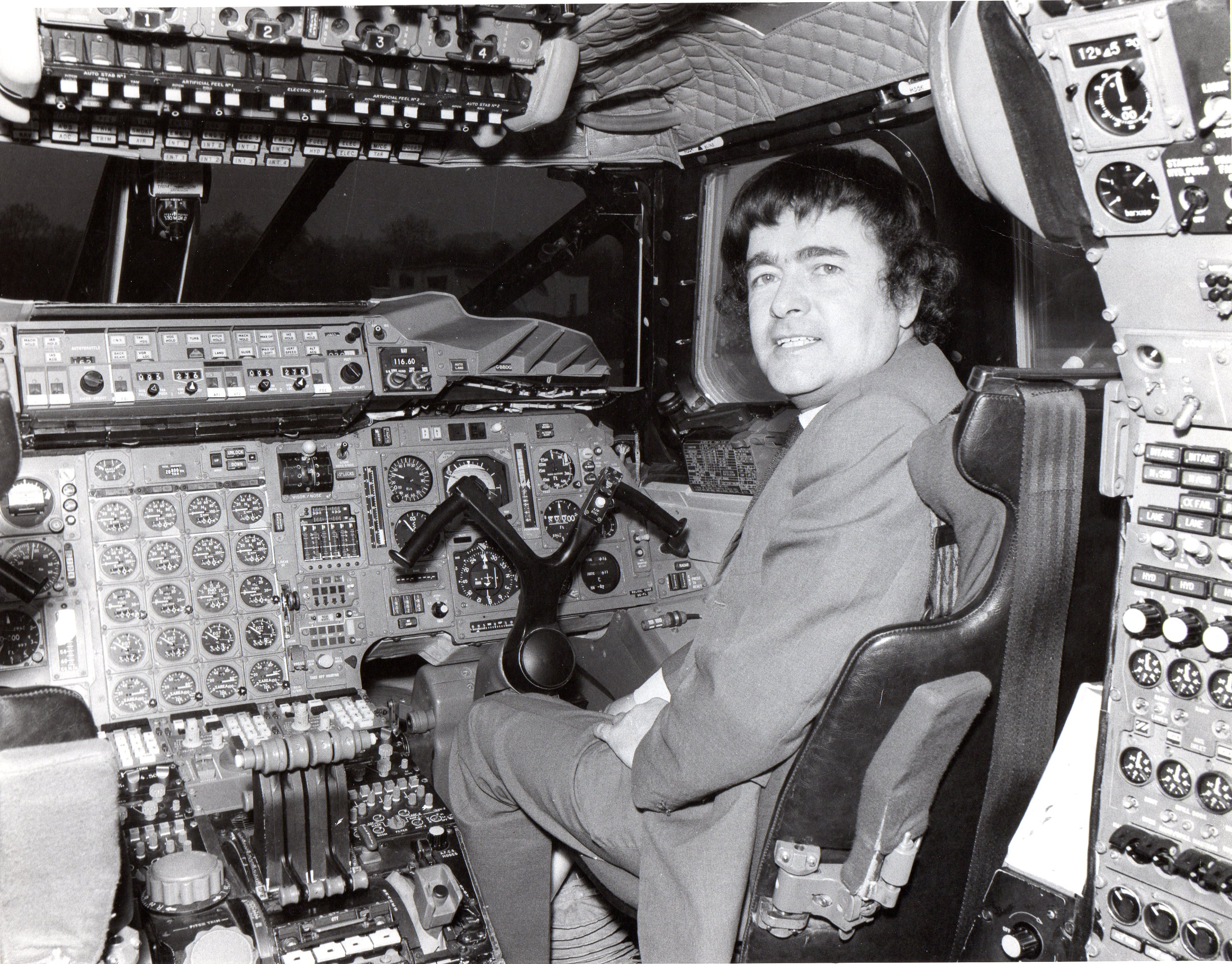

Member of Parliament for Bristol North West
- In office 10 October 1974 – 3 May 1979
- Preceded by: Martin McLaren
- Succeeded by: Michael Colvin

Personal details
- Born: 16 March 1929 Shrewsbury, England
- Died: 19 December 2020 (aged 91)
- Party: Labour
- Education: Ruskin College

Ronald Richard Thomas (16 March 1929 – 19 December 2020) was a British Labour Party politician and Member of Parliament (MP) who represented Bristol North West from 1974 to 1979. He was also a councillor on Bristol City Council (from 1973 to 1976) and Avon County Council (from 1985 to 1993).

== Early life ==
Born on 16 March 1929 in Shrewsbury, Shropshire, Thomas was educated at the University of Oxford. He was at Ruskin College for two years, and then Balliol, where he took a degree in Philosophy, Politics and Economics, receiving an MA. He became a Senior Lecturer in Economic and Industrial Studies at the University of Bristol, and edited the book An Exercise in Redeployment: The Report of a Trade Union Study Group, published in 1969.

== Political career ==
Thomas was a member of Unite the Union (which his former union, the Association of Scientific, Technical and Managerial Staffs ASTMS, has since merged with). He was elected to Bristol City Council in 1973, representing the Hillfields ward (part of the Bristol North East constituency).

Thomas contested the marginal Bristol North West seat at the February 1974 general election, which had been called by Prime Minister Edward Heath. He lost by 650 votes, and the Conservative incumbent Martin McLaren held his seat with a lead of 1.2%. The outcome of the election was that Labour leader Harold Wilson became prime minister as leader of a minority Labour government; however, he called another election later that year in the hope of achieving a stable majority.

On his second attempt, Thomas gained the seat at that election, which took place in October 1974. He won Bristol North West by just 633 votes, and a majority of 1.2%, approximately the same share he had previously lost by. There was a swing to Labour of 2.3% (higher than the national swing of 2.0%), and Labour won a small majority in the House of Commons, where Thomas became the chairman of the Tribune Group of left-wing Labour MPs. In 1975, he was part of a joint statement made by Bristol Labour MPs advocating a vote against membership of the European Communities in that year's UK referendum.

Thomas remained a Bristol City councillor until the 1976 Bristol elections. From his election to Parliament until 2017 (when Labour gained it, despite losing nationally), Bristol North West was a bellwether, with it reflecting the national result. He was one of the most rebellious Labour MPs of the 1974 to 1979 Parliament, voting against his party's government 137 times, a number which was second only to Dennis Skinner.

In 1979, another election was called, following the loss of the Labour majority in Parliament. By this time, James Callaghan had taken over from Wilson as Labour leader and prime minister, but he lost the general election to the new Conservative leader, Margaret Thatcher. In this context, Thomas lost his seat to the Conservative candidate, Michael Colvin, on a swing of 5.0%, who won with a majority of 4,677 (8.8%).

=== After Parliament ===
Thomas did not contest his former seat again, or stand at the next general election, in 1983. He was elected as a councillor on Avon County Council in 1985, representing Eastville ward (centred on the area of the same name). He co-ordinated the Bristol TUC inquiry into the 1980 St Pauls riot (and its published report, "Slumbering Volcano"), and the Bristol Miners' Support Group during the strike of 1984-1985.

At the subsequent general election in 1987, Thomas was again a Labour candidate, this time for Bristol East, which bordered his former seat and included the Eastville ward which he represented as a councillor. However, he was unsuccessful in gaining the seat from the incumbent Conservative MP, Jonathan Sayeed, in a general election which saw the Conservatives under Thatcher win their third majority in a row, albeit with a swing to Labour.

Locally, Bristol East saw the Conservative vote share increase, and Labour's share decline, representing a 2.3% swing to Sayeed and his party. This was the last parliamentary election which Thomas contested; he was re-elected to Eastville in 1989, and did not stand at the subsequent 1993 Avon elections.

As a member of the Bristol Trades Council, he supported the launch of the Justice for Pensioners Campaign in August 2000, which took place in Bristol.

On 22 June 2016, a letter from Thomas, describing himself as a "former 'old' Labour MP", was published in the Bristol Post. Striking a Eurosceptic tone, he noted the link between the vice-chancellor of the University of the West of England advocating a vote for 'Remain' in the forthcoming European Union referendum, and a subsequent report on the university receiving £60 million from the EU. The day before the referendum, Thomas appeared to be endorsing a vote for 'Leave', when he wrote:

Was this not an example of the recycling back to the UK of part of the massive annual fee paid to be a member of the EU Club? And is it not the case that unelected bureaucrats decide who the recipients shall be? Some of us believe that taxation and payments and grants etc., out of that taxation should be determined by our elected representatives in the House of Commons. It is an essential part of the sovereignty of people and parliament which hopefully will be restored after the Referendum vote.

== Personal life and death ==
Thomas married artist Lilian Audrey Jones in Shrewsbury, Shropshire, in 1951; the couple had two sons, musicians Paul Thomas (who predeceased him) and Sean Thomas (later Sean Thomas-Bouzas), and a grandson, Alain Thomas-Bouzas. Lilian predeceased her husband.

Thomas lived in Lockleaze, Bristol. He died on 19 December 2020 of metastatic prostate cancer, aged 91.

Parliament of the United Kingdom
Preceded by Martin McLaren	Member of Parliament for Bristol North West; October 1974–1979	Succeeded by Michael Colvin
