= Christopher Boyd (politician) =

British politician (1916–2004)

Thomas Christopher Boyd
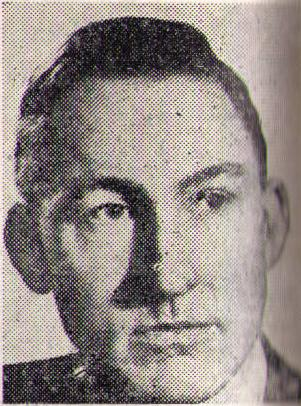
- Born: 14 August 1916; Edmonton, Alberta, Canada
- Died: 15 March 2004 (aged 87); Appledore, Kent, England

Thomas Christopher Boyd (14 August 1916 – 15 March 2004) was a British Labour Party politician.

Boyd unsuccessfully fought Isle of Thanet in 1950 and Harborough at the 1951 general election.

At the 1955 general election, he was elected as member of parliament (MP) for Bristol North West, defeating the sitting Conservative MP Gurney Braithwaite. He served in the House of Commons for only four years, losing his seat at the 1959 general election to the Conservative Martin McLaren.

After losing his seat at the 1959 general election, Boyd moved to Moffat, Scotland. He then retired to Appledore, Kent.

Parliament of the United Kingdom
Preceded by Gurney Braithwaite	Member of Parliament for Bristol North West; 1955–1959	Succeeded by Martin McLaren
