= John Ellis (Labour politician) =

British politician (1930–2019)

John Ellis (22 October 1930 – 27 May 2019) was a British Labour Party politician.

Ellis was educated at Doncaster Grammar School and Rastrick Grammar School, Brighouse. He was a laboratory technician and was employed in the Meteorological Office. He served as a councillor on Easthampstead Rural District Council from 1962.

Ellis contested Wokingham in 1964. He was Member of Parliament for Bristol North West from 1966 to 1970 (when he lost the seat), and then for Brigg and Scunthorpe from 1974 to 1979, when he lost to the Conservative Michael Brown by 486 votes (0.7%). Ivor Crewe, Director of the British Election Study, attributed his defeat to the intervention of a Democratic Labour Party candidate, who polled over 2,000 votes, and thus "splintered enough of the Labour vote" to allow the Conservatives narrowly win the seat.

Ellis was an assistant government whip from 1974 to 1976. He also served as a member of the Commons Expenditure Committee.

He died in Scunthorpe in May 2019 at the age of 88.

Parliament of the United Kingdom
Preceded by Martin McLaren	Member of Parliament for Bristol North West; 1966–1970	Succeeded by Martin McLaren
New constituency	Member of Parliament for Brigg and Scunthorpe; Feb 1974–1979	Succeeded by Michael Brown
