= Bristol North West =

Parliamentary constituency in the United Kingdom, 1950 onwards

Coordinates: 51.50286°N 2.61783°W

- Borough constituency for the House of Commons
- Interactive map of boundaries from 2024
- Boundary of Bristol North West in South West England
- County: Bristol
- Population: 100,809 (2011 UK Census)
- Electorate: 76,783 (2023)
- Major settlements: Avonmouth, Sea Mills, Shirehampton

Current constituency
- Created: 1950
- Member of Parliament: Darren Jones (Labour)
- Seats: One
- Created from: Bristol West and Thornbury

Bristol North West is a constituency (Note: A borough constituency (for the purposes of election expenses and type of returning officer)) represented in the House of Commons of the UK Parliament since 2017 by Darren Jones of the Labour Party. (Note: As with all constituencies, the constituency elects one Member of Parliament (MP) by the first past the post system of election at least every five years.)

== Constituency profile ==
The Bristol North West constituency is located in the city of Bristol in South West England. It covers the suburbs to the north-west of the city centre and extends to the Severn Estuary. Neighbourhoods in the constituency include Avonmouth, Shirehampton, Westbury-on-Trym, Stoke Bishop, Southmead and Horfield. Bristol is a major port city and has a long history of trade, including the slave trade. Avonmouth is the location of the Avonmouth Docks which make up most of the Port of Bristol. Stoke Bishop and its surrounding area are highly affluent and are in the top 10% least-deprived areas in the country, whilst there are high levels of deprivation in Avonmouth and Southmead.

Residents of Bristol North West are generally younger, wealthier, more likely to be degree-educated and more likely to work in professional employment compared to national averages. House prices in the constituency are high. The ethnic makeup is similar to the country as a whole; White people are 86% of the constituency's population. Local politics are mixed; Labour Party councillors represent Avonmouth and Southmead at the city council whilst the remainder of the constituency is represented by a mixture of Conservatives, Liberal Democrats and Greens. An estimated 61% of voters in Bristol North West supported remaining in the European Union in the 2016 referendum, higher than the national figure of 48%.

== History ==
Bristol North West has traditionally been a Conservative–Labour swing seat, having elected five Conservative Party and five Labour Party Members of Parliament since its creation in 1950.

The 2017 win was a surprise to the successful Labour candidate Darren Jones. Jones was re-elected in 2019 with an increased majority at an election where Labour suffered one of its worst ever defeats. He was re-elected in 2024 with a majority of 15,669, the largest recorded since the constituency was created, with the Conservatives falling to third place behind the Green Party.

== Boundaries ==
The constituency boundary extends into the Severn Estuary.

1950–1955: The County Borough of Bristol wards of Avon, Durdham, Horfield, and Westbury-on-Trym.

1955–1983: The County Borough of Bristol wards of Avon, Henbury, Horfield, Southmead, and Westbury-on-Trym.

1983–1997: The City of Bristol wards of Avonmouth, Henbury, Horfield, Kingsweston, Lockleaze, Southmead, and Westbury-on-Trym, and the District of Northavon wards of Filton Charborough, Filton Conygre, Filton Northville, Stoke Gifford North, and Stoke Gifford South.

1997–2010: The City of Bristol wards of Avonmouth, Henbury, Horfield, Kingsweston, Lockleaze, and Southmead, and the South Gloucestershire wards of Filton Charborough, Filton Conygre, Filton Northville, Patchway Callicroft, Patchway Coniston, Patchway Stoke Lodge, Stoke Gifford North, and Stoke Gifford South.

2010–2024: The City of Bristol wards of Avonmouth, Henbury, Henleaze, Horfield, Kingsweston, Lockleaze, Southmead, Stoke Bishop, and Westbury-on-Trym.

Following the review by the Boundary Commission for England into parliamentary representation in the former county of Avon Somerset and Gloucestershire the constituency had boundary changes at the 2010 general election. In particular, the constituency is now wholly contained within the City of Bristol: the areas of Filton, Patchway, Stoke Gifford, Bradley Stoke and Aztec West which are in the South Gloucestershire district were transferred to a new Filton and Bradley Stoke constituency. At the same time, the areas of Stoke Bishop, Henleaze and Westbury-on-Trym were gained from Bristol West.

2024–present: The City of Bristol wards of: Avonmouth & Lawrence Weston; Bishopston & Ashley Down; Henbury & Brentry; Horfield; Southmead; Stoke Bishop; and Westbury-on-Trym & Henleaze.

Moderate boundary changes involving the gain of Bishopston and Ashley Down from Bristol West, offset by the loss of Lockleaze moved into the re-established Bristol North East constituency.

== Members of Parliament ==
Election	Member	Party
1950	Gurney Braithwaite	Conservative
1955	Christopher Boyd	Labour
1959	Martin McLaren	Conservative
1966	John Ellis	Labour
1970	Martin McLaren	Conservative
Oct 1974	Ronald Thomas	Labour
1979	Michael Colvin	Conservative
1983	Michael Stern	Conservative
1997	Doug Naysmith	Labour
2010	Charlotte Leslie	Conservative
2017	Darren Jones	Labour

== Elections ==
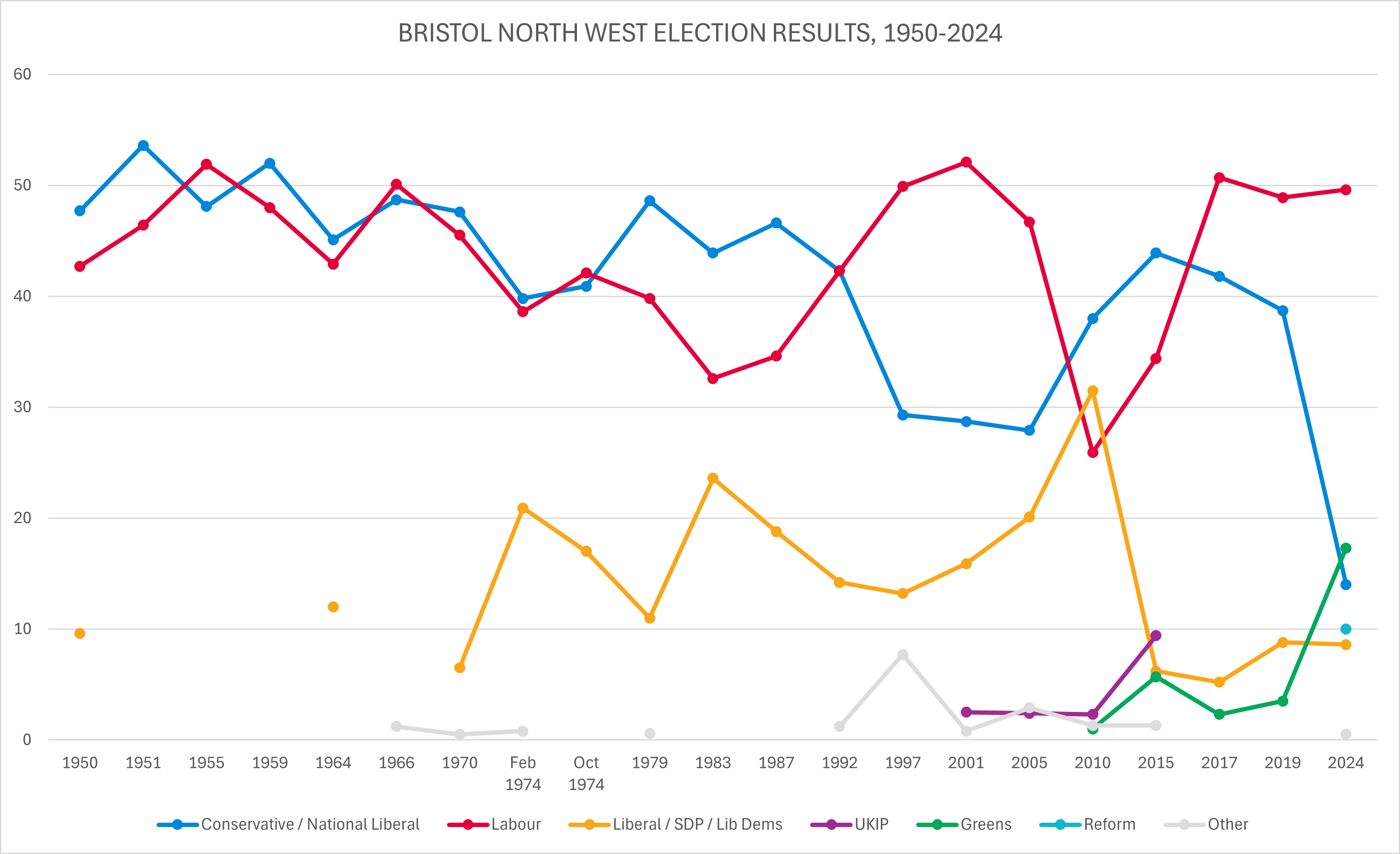
Election results 1950-2024

=== Elections in the 2020s ===
General election 2024: Bristol North West
Party	Candidate	Votes	%	±%
Labour	Darren Jones	24,058	49.6	+0.7
Green	Mary Page	8,389	17.3	+10.9
Conservative	Laura Saunders (Note: After nominations for the 2024 general election closed, the Conservative Party withdrew support for Laura Saunders on 25 June due to alleged placing of bets on the date of the election.)	6,773	14.0	−22.5
Reform	Scarlett O'Connor	4,863	10.0	+9.9
Liberal Democrats	Caroline Gooch	4,159	8.6	+0.5
SDP	Ben Smith	222	0.5	N/A
Majority		15,669	32.3	+19.9
Turnout		48,464	64.7	−11.4
Registered electors		74,869		
Labour hold		Swing	▼5.1	

=== Elections in the 2010s ===
2019 notional result
Party	Vote	%
Labour	28,547	48.9
Conservative	21,312	36.5
Liberal Democrats	4,735	8.1
Green	3,728	6.4
Brexit Party	83	0.1
Turnout	58,405	76.1
Electorate	76,783	

General election 2019: Bristol North West
Party	Candidate	Votes	%	±%
Labour	Darren Jones	27,330	48.9	−1.8
Conservative	Mark Weston	21,638	38.7	−3.1
Liberal Democrats	Chris Coleman	4,940	8.8	+3.6
Green	Heather Mack	1,977	3.5	+1.2
Majority		5,692	10.2	+1.3
Turnout		55,885	73.3	+1.6
Labour hold		Swing	+0.7	

General election 2017: Bristol North West
Party	Candidate	Votes	%	±%
Labour	Darren Jones	27,400	50.7	+16.3
Conservative	Charlotte Leslie	22,639	41.8	−2.1
Liberal Democrats	Celia Downie	2,814	5.2	−1.0
Green	Sharmila Bousa (withdrawn)	1,243	2.3	−3.4
Majority		4,761	8.9	N/A
Turnout		54,096	71.7	+4.1
Labour gain from Conservative		Swing	+9.2	

General election 2015: Bristol North West
Party	Candidate	Votes	%	±%
Conservative	Charlotte Leslie	22,767	43.9	+5.9
Labour	Darren Jones	17,823	34.4	+8.5
UKIP	Michael Frost	4,889	9.4	+7.1
Liberal Democrats	Clare Campion-Smith	3,214	6.2	−25.3
Green	Justin Quinnell	2,952	5.7	+4.7
TUSC	Anne Lemon	160	0.3	N/A
Majority		4,944	9.5	+3.0
Turnout		51,805	67.6	−0.9
Conservative hold		Swing	-1.3	

General election 2010: Bristol North West
Party	Candidate	Votes	%	±%
Conservative	Charlotte Leslie	19,115	38.0	+5.5
Liberal Democrats	Paul Harrod	15,841	31.5	+6.6
Labour	Sam Townend	13,059	25.9	−12.2
UKIP	Robert Upton	1,175	2.3	+0.7
English Democrat	Ray Carr	635	1.3	−0.4
Green	Alex Dunn	511	1.0	N/A
Majority		3,274	6.5	N/A
Turnout		50,336	68.5	−0.3
Conservative gain from Labour		Swing	+15.45 (Note: Labour to Conservative: for Others to Conservative the swing was 10.1%)	

=== Elections in the 2000s ===
General election 2005: Bristol North West
Party	Candidate	Votes	%	±%
Labour Co-op	Doug Naysmith	22,192	46.7	−5.4
Conservative	Alastair Watson	13,230	27.9	−0.8
Liberal Democrats	Bob Hoyle	9,545	20.1	+4.2
UKIP	Christopher Lees	1,132	2.4	−0.1
English Democrat	Michael Blundell	828	1.7	N/A
Socialist	Graeme Jones	565	1.2	N/A
Majority		8,962	18.8	−4.6
Turnout		47,492	61.1	+0.7
Labour Co-op hold		Swing	−2.3	

General election 2001: Bristol North West
Party	Candidate	Votes	%	±%
Labour Co-op	Doug Naysmith	24,236	52.1	+2.2
Conservative	Charles Hansard	13,349	28.7	−0.6
Liberal Democrats	Peter Tyzack	7,387	15.9	+2.7
UKIP	Diane Carr	1,140	2.5	N/A
Socialist Labour	Vince Horrigan	371	0.8	−0.1
Majority		10,887	23.4	+2.8
Turnout		46,483	60.4	−13.3
Labour Co-op hold		Swing	+1.4	

=== Elections in the 1990s ===
General election 1997: Bristol North West
Party	Candidate	Votes	%	±%
Labour Co-op	Doug Naysmith	27,575	49.9	+7.6
Conservative	Michael Stern	16,193	29.3	−13.0
Liberal Democrats	Ian Parry	7,263	13.2	−1.0
Independent Labour	Charles Horton	1,718	3.1	N/A
Referendum	John Quintanillia	1,609	2.9	N/A
Socialist Labour	Giles Shorter	482	0.9	N/A
BNP	Stephen Parnell	265	0.5	N/A
Natural Law	Thomas Leighton	140	0.3	N/A
Majority		11,382	20.6	N/A
Turnout		55,245	73.7	−8.6
Labour Co-op gain from Conservative		Swing	+10.3	

General election 1992: Bristol North West
Party	Candidate	Votes	%	±%
Conservative	Michael Stern	25,354	42.3	−4.3
Labour Co-op	Doug Naysmith	25,309	42.3	+7.7
Liberal Democrats	John D. Taylor	8,498	14.2	−4.6
Independent Ind SD	Hilary S. Long	729	1.2	N/A
Majority		45	0.1	−12.0
Turnout		59,890	82.3	+2.9
Conservative hold		Swing	−6.0	

=== Elections in the 1980s ===
General election 1987: Bristol North West
Party	Candidate	Votes	%	±%
Conservative	Michael Stern	26,953	46.6	+2.7
Labour	Terence Walker	20,001	34.6	+2.0
SDP	John Kirkaldy	10,885	18.8	−4.8
Majority		6,952	12.0	+0.7
Turnout		57,839	79.4	+2.5
Conservative hold		Swing	+2.7 (Note: Others to Conservative; Labour to Conservative swing was 0.7%)	

General election 1983: Bristol North West
Party	Candidate	Votes	%	±%
Conservative	Michael Stern	24,617	43.9	
Labour Co-op	Sarah R. Palmer	18,290	32.6	
SDP	Hilary S. Long	13,228	23.6	N/A
Majority		6,327	11.3	
Turnout		56,135	76.9	
Conservative hold		Swing	-8.65 (Note: Conservative to Liberal/SDP. Labour to Conservative: 2.5%)	

=== Elections in the 1970s ===
General election 1979: Bristol North West
Party	Candidate	Votes	%	±%
Conservative	Michael Colvin	25,915	48.6	+7.7
Labour	Ronald Thomas	21,238	39.8	−2.3
Liberal	G.A. Davis	5,857	11.0	−6.0
National Front	P.M. Kingston	264	0.5	N/A
More Prosperous Britain	T.L. Keen	73	0.1	N/A
Majority		4,677	8.8	N/A
Turnout		53,347	81.3	+2.0
Conservative gain from Labour		Swing	+5.0	

General election October 1974: Bristol North West
Party	Candidate	Votes	%	±%
Labour	Ronald Thomas	22,156	42.1	+3.5
Conservative	Martin McLaren	21,523	40.9	+1.1
Liberal	E. David	8,914	17.0	−3.9
Majority		633	1.2	N/A
Turnout		52,593	79.3	−3.2
Labour gain from Conservative		Swing	+1.2	

General election February 1974: Bristol North West
Party	Candidate	Votes	%	±%
Conservative	Martin McLaren	21,569	39.8	−7.8
Labour	Ronald Thomas	20,919	38.6	−6.9
Liberal	E. David	11,312	20.9	+14.4
Independent	T.E. Wetherall	440	0.8	N/A
Majority		650	1.2	−0.9
Turnout		54,240	82.5	+4.5
Conservative hold		Swing	-0.5	

General election 1970: Bristol North West
Party	Candidate	Votes	%	±%
Conservative	Martin McLaren	24,124	47.6	−1.1
Labour	John Ellis	23,075	45.5	−4.6
Liberal	H.J. Stevens	3,299	6.5	N/A
Communist	W.E. Williams	227	0.5	−0.7
Majority		1,049	2.1	N/A
Turnout		50,725	78.0	−4.0
Conservative gain from Labour		Swing	+1.75	

=== Elections in the 1960s ===
General election 1966: Bristol North West
Party	Candidate	Votes	%	±%
Labour	John Ellis	24,195	50.1	+7.2
Conservative	Martin McLaren	23,526	48.7	+3.6
Communist	B. Underwood	595	1.2	N/A
Majority		669	1.4	N/A
Turnout		48,316	82.0	−1.1
Labour gain from Conservative		Swing	+1.8 (Note: 4.6% swing Others to Labour)	

General election 1964: Bristol North West
Party	Candidate	Votes	%	±%
Conservative	Martin McLaren	22,129	45.1	−6.9
Labour	David Watkins	21,030	42.9	−5.1
Liberal	T.G. Douglas	5,883	12.0	N/A
Majority		1,099	2.2	−1.8
Turnout		49,042	83.1	+0.2
Conservative hold		Swing	-0.9	

=== Elections in the 1950s ===
General election 1959: Bristol North West
Party	Candidate	Votes	%	±%
Conservative	Martin McLaren	24,938	52.0	+3.9
Labour	Christopher Boyd	23,019	48.0	−3.9
Majority		1,919	4.0	N/A
Turnout		47,957	82.9	+3.8
Conservative gain from Labour		Swing	+3.9	

General election 1955: Bristol North West
Party	Candidate	Votes	%	±%
Labour	Christopher Boyd	22,950	51.9	+5.5
Conservative	Gurney Braithwaite	21,295	48.1	−5.5
Majority		1,655	3.8	N/A
Turnout		44,245	79.1	−7.0
Labour gain from Conservative		Swing	+5.5	

General election 1951: Bristol North West
Party	Candidate	Votes	%	±%
Conservative	Gurney Braithwaite	28,394	53.6	+5.9
Labour	Claud Morris	24,553	46.4	+3.7
Majority		3,841	7.2	+2.2
Turnout		52,947	86.1	+1.0
Conservative hold		Swing	+2.2 (Note: Others to Conservative swing: 5.9%)	

General election 1950: Bristol North West
Party	Candidate	Votes	%	±%
Conservative	Gurney Braithwaite	23,884	47.7	
Labour	Claud Morris	21,394	42.7	
Liberal	Frances Mary Pugh	4,784	9.6	
Majority		2,490	5.0	
Turnout		50,062	85.1	
Conservative win (new seat)				

- Constituency created 1950 from parts of Bristol West and Thornbury constituencies

== See also ==
- List of parliamentary constituencies in Avon
