= Brigg and Scunthorpe =

UK Parliament constituency (1974–1983)

- Former county constituency for the House of Commons
- County: Humberside

1974–1983
- Seats: One
- Created from: Brigg
- Replaced by: Brigg & Cleethorpes and Glanford & Scunthorpe

Brigg and Scunthorpe was a parliamentary constituency centred on the towns of Brigg and Scunthorpe in Humberside. It returned one Member of Parliament (MP) to the House of Commons of the Parliament of the United Kingdom.

The constituency was created for the February 1974 general election, mostly from the former seat of Brigg, and abolished for the 1983 general election, when it was partially replaced by the new constituencies of Brigg & Cleethorpes and Glanford & Scunthorpe.

== Boundaries ==
The Borough of Scunthorpe, the Urban Districts of Barton-upon-Humber and Brigg, and the Rural District of Glanford Brigg.

== Members of Parliament ==
Election	Member	Party
Feb 1974	John Ellis	Labour
1979	Michael Brown	Conservative
1983	constituency abolished	

== Election results ==
=== Elections in the 1970s ===
General election February 1974: Brigg and Scunthorpe
Party	Candidate	Votes	%	±%
Labour	John Ellis	28,803	41.14	
Conservative	JPS Riddell	25,729	36.75	
Liberal	J Harris	15,484	22.11	
Majority		3,074	4.39	
Turnout		70,016	78.35	
Labour win (new seat)				

General election October 1974: Brigg and Scunthorpe
Party	Candidate	Votes	%	±%
Labour	John Ellis	28,929	45.51	
Conservative	JPS Riddell	22,187	34.90	
Liberal	J Harris	12,452	19.59	
Majority		6,742	10.61	
Turnout		63,568	70.51	
Labour hold		Swing		

General election 1979: Brigg and Scunthorpe
Party	Candidate	Votes	%	±%
Conservative	Michael Brown	31,130	43.42	
Labour	John Ellis	30,644	42.74	
Liberal	M Beard	7,764	10.83	
Democratic Labour	Cyril Nottingham	2,042	2.85	New
Independent	M Nottingham	123	0.17	New
Majority		486	0.68	N/A
Turnout		71,703	75.62	
Conservative gain from Labour		Swing		
