= Brigg and Cleethorpes =

UK Parliament constituency (1983–1997)

- Former county constituency for the House of Commons
- Brigg and Cleethorpes in Humberside, showing boundaries used from 1983–1997
- County: 1983–1996 Humberside; 1996–1997 North Lincolnshire and North East Lincolnshire
- Major settlements: Brigg, Immingham, Cleethorpes

1983–1997
- Seats: One
- Created from: Brigg & Scunthorpe and Louth
- Replaced by: Cleethorpes and Brigg & Goole

Brigg and Cleethorpes was a constituency on the south bank of the Humber estuary which returned one Member of Parliament (MP) to the House of Commons of the Parliament of the United Kingdom, elected by the first-past-the-post voting system.

It was created for the 1983 general election, and abolished for the 1997 general election.

== History ==
This safe Conservative seat was held by Michael Brown for the entire period of its existence.

== Boundaries ==
The Borough of Cleethorpes, and the Borough of Glanford wards of Abbey, Barton-upon-Humber Bridge, Barton-upon-Humber Park, Brigg, Goxhill, Humber, Kirton, North Ancholme, Scawby, South Ancholme, Ulceby, Wold, and Wrawby.

The constituency was formed from the eastern part of the Borough of Glanford plus the Borough of Cleethorpes. In 1997, an extra seat was allocated to the Humber, with the result that constituencies in the region needed to cover a smaller population. The new constituency of Cleethorpes was created with this in mind, with the remainder of the constituency forming part of Brigg and Goole.

== Members of Parliament ==
Election	Member	Party
1983	Michael Brown	Conservative
1997	constituency abolished: see Cleethorpes and Brigg & Goole	

== Elections ==
1979 notional result
Party	Vote	%
Conservative	26,104	46.6
Liberal	14,624	26.1
Labour	14,590	26.0
Others	724	1.3
Turnout	56,042	
Electorate		

=== Elections in the 1980s ===
General election 1983: Brigg and Cleethorpes
Party	Candidate	Votes	%	±%
Conservative	Michael Brown	28,893	50.7	+4.1
Liberal	Gavin Wigginton	16,704	29.3	+3.2
Labour	John Hough	11,404	20.0	−6.0
Majority		12,189	21.4	+0.9
Turnout		57,001	73.6	
Registered electors		77,471		
Conservative win (new seat)				

General election 1987: Brigg and Cleethorpes
Party	Candidate	Votes	%	±%
Conservative	Michael Brown	29,723	48.7	−2.0
Liberal	Ian Powney	17,475	28.6	−0.7
Labour	Terence Geraghty	13,876	22.7	+2.7
Majority		12,248	20.1	−1.3
Turnout		61,074	76.2	+2.6
Registered electors		80,096		
Conservative hold		Swing	−0.7	

=== Elections in the 1990s ===
General election 1992: Brigg and Cleethorpes
Party	Candidate	Votes	%	±%
Conservative	Michael Brown	31,673	49.2	+0.6
Labour	Ian Cawsey	22,494	35.0	+12.2
Liberal Democrats	Margaret Cockbill	9,374	14.6	−14.0
Green	Douglas Jacques	790	1.2	New
Majority		9,179	14.3	−5.8
Turnout		64,331	78.1	+1.8
Registered electors		82,377		
Conservative hold		Swing	−5.8	

== See also ==
- List of parliamentary constituencies in Humberside
