= Susan Crosland =

British-American journalist and novelist

- Born: Susan Barnes Watson; 23 January 1927 Baltimore, Maryland, U.S.
- Died: 26 February 2011 (aged 84) London, England
- Occupation: Journalist; novelist
- Education: Vassar College
- Period: 1958–2002
- Spouse: Patrick Skene Catling (m. 1949; div. 1960) Anthony Crosland (m. 1964; died 1977)

Susan Barnes Crosland (née Watson; 23 January 1927 – 26 February 2011) was a British-American journalist who lived and worked primarily in London. She was the widow of the Labour Party politician Anthony Crosland.

== Biography ==
Born Susan Barnes Watson in Baltimore, the descendant of passengers on the Mayflower, she was the daughter of Mark Skinner Watson, a defence correspondent for The Baltimore Sun, later the publication's editor, and Susan Owens who was also a journalist. She graduated from Vassar College and taught at the Baltimore Museum of Art. On 11 June 1949, she married Patrick Skene Catling, then working with her father, and relocated to London in 1956 when Catling was posted to the London office of The Baltimore Sun.

At a party during the year she met Anthony Crosland shortly after The Future of Socialism, his most significant book, had been published. Her first marriage collapsed in 1960, and she and Crosland married in 1964; they initially kept separate residences. By now, she had begun to write for British newspapers, originally as Susan Barnes. Taken on by John Junor of The Sunday Express just prior to her divorce, she freelanced after her second marriage, and specialised in writing features and profile articles. Following a period on the pre-Murdoch The Sun, Crosland worked for The Sunday Times from 1970. Known for her profiles, she insisted on not interviewing the wives of 'great men' feeling that "they wanted to perpetuate the image". Labour politician Tony Benn though, one of her subjects and a friend of her husband, persuaded Crosland not publish an article dedicated to himself (he had been allowed to vet it) which Benn considered unflattering. The interview was eventually published in The Spectator during October 1987.

Crosland strongly supported her husband throughout his political career, culminating in his appointment as foreign secretary in 1976. Anthony Crosland died from a cerebral haemorrhage the following year. She was asked to stand as the Labour candidate for his Grimsby constituency in the subsequent by-election, but declined. She subsequently wrote a well-received biography of him, which was published in 1982. One friend she acquired in this period via the biography, Therese Lawson, second wife of the Conservative politician Nigel Lawson, once spoke of the impression Crosland made on her:

Some people make a deliberate stage entrance. Susan isn't like that but she does have a definite presence. Her voice has a slow, gentle, appealing laugh to it. It's not in the least bit raucous. Susan is much too ladylike for that. She has a particular American sense of humour which I appreciate.

Resuming her writing career, a biography of Anthony Blunt fell through after Crosland had already spent a third of the advance. George Weidenfeld, her publisher, suggested a novel instead, the result Ruling Passions appeared in 1989, the first of several works of fiction ending with The Politician's Wife in 2001. Crosland also assembled two volumes of collected journalism.

By the mid-1980s, Crosland had formed a deep platonic relationship with the conservative journalist Auberon Waugh which lasted until his death in 2001. By then, she had begun to suffer from severe arthritis, thought to have had its origins in a riding accident she had suffered at age eighteen, and acquired the MRSA bacterium while in hospital having a hip replaced; the infection went undiagnosed for some time and caused substantial health issues. She died at her flat in west London on 26 February 2011, aged 84.
