= The Chocolate Touch =

Book by Patrick Skene Catling

- 1979 HarperCollins edition
- Author: Patrick Skene Catling
- Illustrator: Mildred Coughlin McNutt
- Language: English
- Published: 1957 by William Morrow
- Publication place: United States
- Pages: 128
- OCLC: 1470182

The Chocolate Touch is a children's book by Patrick Skene Catling, first published in the US in 1957. John Midas is delighted when, through a magical gift, everything his lips touch turns into chocolate. The story is patterned after the myth of King Midas, whose magic turned everything he touched into gold. The original illustrations were by Mildred Coughlin McNutt, and a "newly illustrated" edition published the same year had illustrations by Margot Apple and more pages.

== Summary ==
John Midas is a young boy with an obsessive love of confectionery, especially chocolate. Dr. Cranium, the Midas' family doctor, warns John that his health is poor and that he is to eat only foods that are conducive to a healthy body, much to the boy's disgruntlement. The doctor's advice is backed by John's parents, who dispose of their son's candy and assert control over his spending money. Angry at his parents, John goes for a walk to clear his head.

While on his walk, he sees a coin on the ground. John rejoices over his good fortune, assuming he just found a way to clandestinely purchase some chocolate. However, when he studies the coin, he sees it is engraved with the image of a fat boy and the letters JM, dismissing it as worthless; even so, John considers the coin somewhat unique (as JM happens to be his initials), and so he decides to hold on to it.

John then comes across a candy store, run by a friendly man whom John has never met before, who refers to him by name and extols his chocolate as the finest ever. The confectioner offers John a box of his chocolates in exchange for the strange coin.

That night, before going to bed, John decides to have one final chocolate feast, only to be dismayed to find the box contains nothing save for a single ordinary chocolate ball. Although it is only a small piece of chocolate, it is the best chocolate he has ever tasted.

The next morning, John is amazed to find everything he eats tastes like chocolate, even his toothpaste and morning toast. Then, the Chocolate Touch goes into full effect, and whatever touches his mouth turns to chocolate.

He soon realises that he cannot properly hydrate himself this way. He then gets tired of eating chocolate, and yearns once again to be able to eat foods with nutrients, viewing ham sandwiches, sliced chicken, cherries and other such fare as Earth's choicest delicacies, for the first time in his young life craving "normal food" instead of candy.

John involuntarily turns his trumpet into a chocolate trumpet during band practice, and he accidentally ruins the birthday party of his friend, Susan, when a game of bobbing for apples results in everyone being awash in chocolate sauce.

John tells his dad he needs help. Under the impression that John needs help with his diet, they go to Dr. Cranium, who prescribes a tonic – whereupon, John promptly spits out chocolate syrup and a chocolate spoon, exposing John's chocolate-transforming ability. Dr. Cranium then turns his attention to his own fame in the medical world, calling this "Cranium's disease"; Mrs. Midas cries when she finds out John is affected by this apparent disease. In order to comfort her, John tries to kiss his mother, but he turns his mother into a chocolate statue.

Horrified, he rushes to the candy store, where the chocolate vendor tells him that only greedy people can see the coin he spent at the store. He offers John a choice between restoring his mother to normal and removing the chocolate touch; John responds by begging him to help his mother. Recognising that John has repented, the shopkeeper promises that all the things John turned to chocolate have reverted to their original states, meaning that neither John's parents nor Dr. Cranium would have any recollection of his previous chocolate-transforming ability, and that John's friendship with Susan had never been ruined.

John returns home to a quiet house, with his mom once again a living human woman.

Realizing that he ought to thank the shopkeeper for undoing the damage, he runs back to the candy store, only to see nothing in its place but an empty lot.

== Themes ==
The Chocolate Touch covers roughly the same narrative as the myth of King Midas, hence the name John Midas, but in changing the object of its protagonist's desire, modifies its target in significant ways. The myth of King Midas, who loved gold above all things, targets greed as its main theme, while The Chocolate Touch highlights another of the Seven Deadly Sins, gluttony. Both stories deal with self-centeredness versus compassion, though The Chocolate Touch does so in a manner accessible to children.

== Significance ==
The Chocolate Touch is still in print, and is often used in grade school curricula throughout the United States. It won the Massachusetts Children's Book Award in 1989, the Utah Children's Choice Honors Award in 1983, and the Beehive Award from the Children's Literature Association of Utah in 1983.
