= Kids for Kids =

Non-profit Charity based in Britain

Kids for Kids is a British nonprofit charity formed in 2001 to help children struggling to survive in remote villages in Darfur, Sudan. It is the only charity created specifically to help the children of Darfur. Kids for Kids has been previously listed in the top three UK charities for the International Development Charity of the Year at the UK Charity Awards.

The charity was founded by Patricia Parker OBE to support children facing hardship in remote villages of Darfur. Kids for Kids provides long-term sustainable projects, identified by the communities themselves and, uniquely, run by them. Projects transform the lives of individual families, helping them out of abject poverty immediately, and transforming the whole community long term.

== About Kids for Kids ==
The original inspiration for the charity was a chance meeting between Patricia Parker OBE and a nine-year-old Sudanese child from the village of Um Ga'al who was struggling across the desert in the immense heat of Darfur, to fetch water for his brothers and sisters. It was a walk that took him seven hours, and then he faced the long walk back. The water he collected would also be used to keep three goats alive—their milk was the children's only source of protein, minerals and vitamins.

Kids for Kids was created at first to provide handpumps close to villages, and a goat loan to ensure protein-rich milk for children to drink. These grassroots projects and more were identified by communities as the most effective ways of enabling them to help themselves. Other projects include providing donkeys for transport, training midwives, first-aid workers and paravets, building Kindergartens, planting trees, and providing basic essentials.

Since conflict erupted across Sudan in 2023, millions have lost their homes, food is scarce, families are desperate. Famine has been announced. Kids for Kids is delivering emergency seed and Kids Kitchen Kits to villages in North Darfur region, lifting families out of dire hardship. Kids Kitchen Kits include will include lentils, ground nuts and cooking oil and other fresh produce for immediate relief.

== Notable Supporters and Patrons ==
Kids for Kids has been mentioned with approval in debates in the House of Lords. Lyse Doucet CM OBE, the BBC's Chief International Correspondent, attended and spoke at the 2024 Kids for Kids Candlelit Christmas Concert. Other notable supporters include Ruth Rendell and Michael Bond. Javier Solana donated half his Carnegie-Wateler Peace Prize money to Kids for Kids in 2007. Timothy West CBE was a Patron of Kids for Kids until he died in 2024.

Current Kids for Kids Patrons include Dame Joanna Lumley OBE FRGS, Miriam Margolyes OBE, Sir David Suchet CBE and Lord Cope of Berkeley PC.

Kids for Kids receives annual support from Queen's Gate School Choirs at the Candlelit Christmas Concert. Other schools who have supported Kids for Kids include City of London School, Eton College,Worth School, Dragon School and many more.
