= The Future of Socialism =

1956 book by British politician Anthony Crosland

- Title page for The Future of Socialism (1957)
- Author: Anthony Crosland
- Language: English
- Subjects: Socialism, Great Britain
- Publisher: Jonathan Cape
- Publication date: 1956
- Publication place: United Kingdom
- Media type: Print (hardcover)
- Pages: 540 pp. (first edition)
- OCLC: 2162209
- LC Class: HX246 .C87

The Future of Socialism is a 1956 book by Anthony Crosland. It was one of the most influential books in post-war British Labour Party thinking. It was the seminal work of the 'revisionist' school of Labour politics.

The book defined Labour's perspective on the post-war consensus, by which the major parties largely agreed on issues of the welfare state and economic policy from 1945 to the late 1970s.

Crosland, an Oxford University academic before entering Parliament, had lost his seat in the 1955 general election, and so was able to finish the book he had been working on for several years, seeking to offer a new argument for social democracy in the context of the new political and economic consensus introduced by the 1945–1951 Clement Attlee governments.

However, The Future of Socialism has continued to be a reference point for intellectual debates within the Labour Party and the centre-left in succeeding generations, including the SDP-Labour split in 1981, the modernisation of Labour under Neil Kinnock and the rise of New Labour. The book's 50th anniversary in 2006 sparked a new debate with leading Labour figures including Gordon Brown, Jack Straw, Ed Miliband, Roy Hattersley and others setting out views of its relevance to the next generation of 'post-New Labour' politics. The Fabian Society, which co-published the 2006 edition, set out the argument about 'renewal' of Labour's thinking after a decade in power requires a further generation of 'revisionist' thinking which seeks to emulate Crosland's contribution in the 1950s.

== Overview ==
A central argument in the book is Crosland's distinction between 'means' and 'ends'. Crosland demonstrates the variety of socialist thought over time, and argues that a definition of socialism founded on nationalisation and public ownership is mistaken, since these are simply one possible means to an end. For Crosland, the defining goal of the left should be more social equality. As a result, Crosland argued:

In Britain, equality of opportunity and social mobility [...] are not enough. They need to be combined with measures [...] to equalise the distribution of rewards and privileges so as to diminish the degree of class stratification, the injustices of large inequalities and the collective discontents.

Crosland also argued that an attack on unjustified inequalities would give any left party a political project to make the definition of the end point of 'how much equality' a secondary and more academic question.

Crosland also developed his argument about the nature of capitalism (developing the argument in his contribution 'The Transition from Capitalism' in the 1952 New Fabian Essays volume). Asking, "is this still capitalism?", Crosland argued that post-war capitalism had fundamentally changed, meaning that the Marxist claim that it was not possible to pursue equality in a capitalist economy was no longer true. Crosland wrote as follows:

The most characteristic features of capitalism have disappeared – the absolute rule of private property, the subjection of all life to market influences, the domination of the profit motive, the neutrality of government, typical laissez-faire division of income and the ideology of individual rights.

Crosland argued that these features of a reformed managerial capitalism were irreversible. Others, including those within the Labour Party, would later argue that Margaret Thatcher and Ronald Reagan brought about its reversal.

A third important argument was Crosland's liberal vision of the 'good society'. Here his target was the dominance in Labour and Fabian thinking of Sidney Webb and Beatrice Webb, and a rather grey, top down bureaucratic vision of the socialist project. Following R. H. Tawney, Crosland stressed that equality would not mean uniformity:

We need not only higher exports and old-age pensions, but more open-air cafes, brighter and gayer streets at night, later closing hours for public houses, more local repertory theatres, better and more hospitable hoteliers and restaurateurs, brighter and cleaner eating houses, more riverside cafes, more pleasure gardens on the Battersea model, more murals and pictures in public places, better designs for furniture and pottery and women’s clothes, statues in the centre of new housing estates, better-designed new street lamps and telephone kiosks and so on ad infinitum.

== Labour revisionism ==
Labour revisionism turned out to be a powerful ideological tendency within the Party in the 1950s and 1960s, taking intellectual sustenance from the Crosland book, and political leadership from Hugh Gaitskell. Other important intellectuals included Douglas Jay, Roy Jenkins, and the writers who contributed to Socialist Commentary. The goal was to reformulate socialist principles, and bring the Labour Party policies up to date with the changing British society and economy. Revisionism rejected what it described as an old view that socialism ought to be primarily identified with the ownership of the means of production. That meant that continuous nationalization was not a central goal. Second, was a series of political values focused on personal liberty, social welfare, and equality. Themes of class struggle were downplayed in favor of policies of high taxation, more widespread educational opportunity, and expanded social services. Revisionists insisted on the necessity of a market-oriented mixed economy with a central role for capitalism and entrepreneurship.

== Reaction and reputation ==
The book was highly controversial at the time of its publication, given the heated dispute between the Gaitskellite and the Bevanite wings over the future direction of the Labour Party. A review of Crosland's book in the left-wing Tribune newspaper became famous for its headline "How dare he call himself a socialist". The book was however largely positively received in the media and right-wing circles of the Labour Party.

Labour thinkers and academics have continued to debate the relevance of Crosland's thinking to more recent political debates within the party. A significant criticism of Crosland in the 1960s and 1970s made is that he had been too sanguine about the prospects for economic growth and so was concerned more about the distribution of wealth than its creation. He had written in The Future of Socialism as follows.

I no longer regard questions of growth and efficiency as being, on a long view, of primary importance to socialism. We stand in Britain on the threshold of mass abundance.

Crosland himself acknowledged in The Conservative Enemy (1962) the validity of the criticism of this view, and in this and his later writings and speeches he addressed the question of growth more centrally.

== Crosland, New Labour and after ==
There are different views on the influence of Crosland on the creation of New Labour. Some see New Labour as arising directly from the revisionist tradition set out in The Future of Socialism, and applying these ideas to the politics of the 1990s. In particular, Tony Blair's decision to rewrite Clause Four of the Labour constitution is seen as achieving a central revisionist goal.

However, New Labour was not keen to promote this link to the party's intellectual tradition, given the marketing of the party as having broken with the past. In substantive terms, while New Labour can be regarded as broadly revisionist, it was ambivalent and reluctant to explicitly commit itself to 'equality' as a goal of Labour politics, although its policies were redistributionist and aimed to reduce child poverty in particular.

Politicians seen as representing the Crosland tradition, most notably former deputy leader Roy Hattersley, who were regarded as firmly on the right of Labour politics throughout their careers, have now tended to find themselves arguing from the left of New Labour. However, leading New Labour figures have also drawn on Crosland's work. Gordon Brown has demonstrated a particular interest in Crosland and his legacy, giving a 1997 Crosland memorial lecture to the Fabian Society, (which was later published in the 1999 book Crosland and New Labour, edited by Dick Leonard), and writing the foreword for the 2006 50th anniversary edition of the book. Recent Labour Education Secretaries, including Ruth Kelly and Alan Johnson, have also drawn on Crosland's thinking in speeches and articles.

Despite its reputation and the frequency with which it is invoked in contemporary Labour debate, the book was out of print for some time. To mark its 50th anniversary, the book was republished by Constable & Robinson in association with the Fabian Society in the autumn of 2006, with a foreword from Brown, an introduction from Leonard and an afterword from Susan Crosland.

== See also ==
- Godesberg Program
