= Northavon (constituency) =

UK Parliament constituency (1983–2010)

Coordinates: 51.604°N 2.518°W

- Former county constituency for the House of Commons
- Boundary of Northavon in Avon for the 2005 general election

- Location of Avon within England
- County: 1983–1996 Avon; 1996–2010 South Gloucestershire
- Major settlements: Thornbury, Yate, Chipping Sodbury

1983–2010
- Seats: One
- Created from: South Gloucestershire
- Replaced by: Thornbury and Yate, Filton and Bradley Stoke

Northavon was, from 1983 until 2010, a constituency represented in the House of Commons of the Parliament of the United Kingdom. It elected one Member of Parliament (MP) by the first past the post system of election.

== History ==
The constituency was established in 1983. Held initially by the Conservative Party, it was gained narrowly by the Liberal Democrats in 1997. The Almanac of British Politics described it as "one of the most unexpected Liberal Democrat gains" of the 1997 election and speculated that a significant amount of tactical voting had benefitted the party in this seat. The seat then swung heavily in the Liberal Democrats favour in 2001 and was held again by the party in 2005.

== Boundaries ==
1983–1997: The District of Northavon wards of Almondsbury, Alveston, Badminton, Charfield, Chipping Sodbury, Dodington North, Frampton Cotterell Central, Frampton Cotterell East, Frampton Cotterell West, Hawkesbury, Iron Acton, Marshfield, Oldbury-on-Severn, Olveston, Patchway Callicroft, Patchway Coniston, Patchway Stoke Lodge, Pilning and Severn Beach, Pucklechurch, Thornbury North, Thornbury South, Westerleigh Stanshawes, Westerleigh and Coalpit Heath, Wick and Abson, Wickwar, Winterbourne, Winterbourne Down and Hambrook, Winterbourne Frenchay, Yate Central, Yate North, Yate South, and Yate West.

1997–2010: The District of Northavon wards of Almondsbury, Alveston, Badminton, Charfield, Chipping Sodbury, Dodington North, Frampton Cotterell Central, Frampton Cotterell East, Frampton Cotterell West, Hawkesbury, Iron Acton, Marshfield, Oldbury-on-Severn, Olveston, Pilning and Severn Beach, Pucklechurch, Thornbury North, Thornbury South, Westerleigh and Coalpit Heath, Wick and Abson, Wickwar, Winterbourne, Winterbourne Down and Hambrook, Winterbourne Frenchay, Yate Central, Yate North, Yate South, Yate Stanshawes, and Yate West.

Northavon covered the same area as the former Northavon district (the more rural part of the current South Gloucestershire district) at its creation, but some of the constituency moved to Bristol North West with the boundary review implemented in 1997. The constituency included suburban and industrial areas on the outskirts of Bristol and several dormitory towns and small villages.

Following the review by the Boundary Commission for England of parliamentary representation in the former Avon county, taking effect at the 2010 general election, the Northavon seat has been abolished. It has been largely replaced by the Thornbury and Yate seat, but also by Filton and Bradley Stoke.

== Members of Parliament ==
Election	Member	Party
1983	Sir John Cope	Conservative
1997	Steve Webb	Liberal Democrat
2010	constituency abolished: see Thornbury and Yate & Filton and Bradley Stoke	

== Elections ==
=== Elections in the 2000s ===
General election 2005: Northavon
Party	Candidate	Votes	%	±%
Liberal Democrats	Steve Webb	30,872	52.3	−0.1
Conservative	Christopher Butt	19,839	33.6	−1.1
Labour	Patricia Gardener	6,277	10.6	−1.0
UKIP	Adrian Blake	1,032	1.7	+0.4
Green	Alan Pinder	922	1.6	New
Independent	Thomas Beacham	114	0.2	New
Majority		11,033	18.7	+1.0
Turnout		59,056	72.2	+1.5
Registered electors		81,800		+3.8
Liberal Democrats hold		Swing	+0.5	

General election 2001: Northavon
Party	Candidate	Votes	%	±%
Liberal Democrats	Steve Webb	29,217	52.4	+10.0
Conservative	Carrie Ruxton	19,340	34.7	−4.3
Labour	Robert Hall	6,450	11.6	−4.0
UKIP	Carmen Carver	751	1.3	−1.7
Majority		9,877	17.7	+14.3
Turnout		55,758	70.7	−8.5
Registered electors		78,841		−0.1
Liberal Democrats hold		Swing		

=== Elections in the 1990s ===
General election 1997: Northavon
Party	Candidate	Votes	%	±%
Liberal Democrats	Steve Webb	26,500	42.4	+7.9
Conservative	John Cope	24,363	39.0	−12.8
Labour	Ronald Stone	9,767	15.6	+3.5
Referendum	John Parfitt	1,900	3.0	New
Majority		2,137	3.4	N/A
Turnout		62,530	79.2	−5.5
Registered electors		78,943		+6.0
Liberal Democrats gain from Conservative		Swing	+10.4	

General election 1992: Northavon
Party	Candidate	Votes	%	±%
Conservative	John Cope	35,338	50.3	−4.1
Liberal Democrats	Heather Larkins	23,477	33.4	+1.7
Labour	Nita Norris	10,290	14.6	+0.7
Green	Jay Greene	789	1.1	0.0
Liberal	Paul Marx	380	0.5	New
Majority		11,861	16.9	−5.8
Turnout		70,274	84.2	+4.0
Registered electors		83,496		+6.4
Conservative hold		Swing	−2.9	

=== Elections in the 1980s ===
General election 1987: Northavon
Party	Candidate	Votes	%	±%
Conservative	John Cope	34,244	54.4	+0.7
Liberal	Christine Willmore	19,954	31.7	+0.6
Labour	Dan Norris	8,762	13.9	−0.5
Majority		14,270	22.7	+0.1
Turnout		62,960	80.2	+2.2
Registered electors		78,483		+6.7
Conservative hold		Swing	0.0	

General election 1983: Northavon
Party	Candidate	Votes	%	±%
Conservative	John Cope	30,790	53.7	+0.9
Liberal	George Conrad	17,807	31.1	+12.6
Labour	Nita Norris	8,243	14.4	−13.4
Ecology	Keith Radmall	499	0.9	0.0
Majority		12,983	22.6	−2.4
Turnout		57,339	78.0	−7.4
Registered electors		73,553		0.0
Conservative win (new seat)				

== See also ==
- List of parliamentary constituencies in Avon
