= Patrick Skene Catling =

British journalist, author and book reviewer (1925–2026)

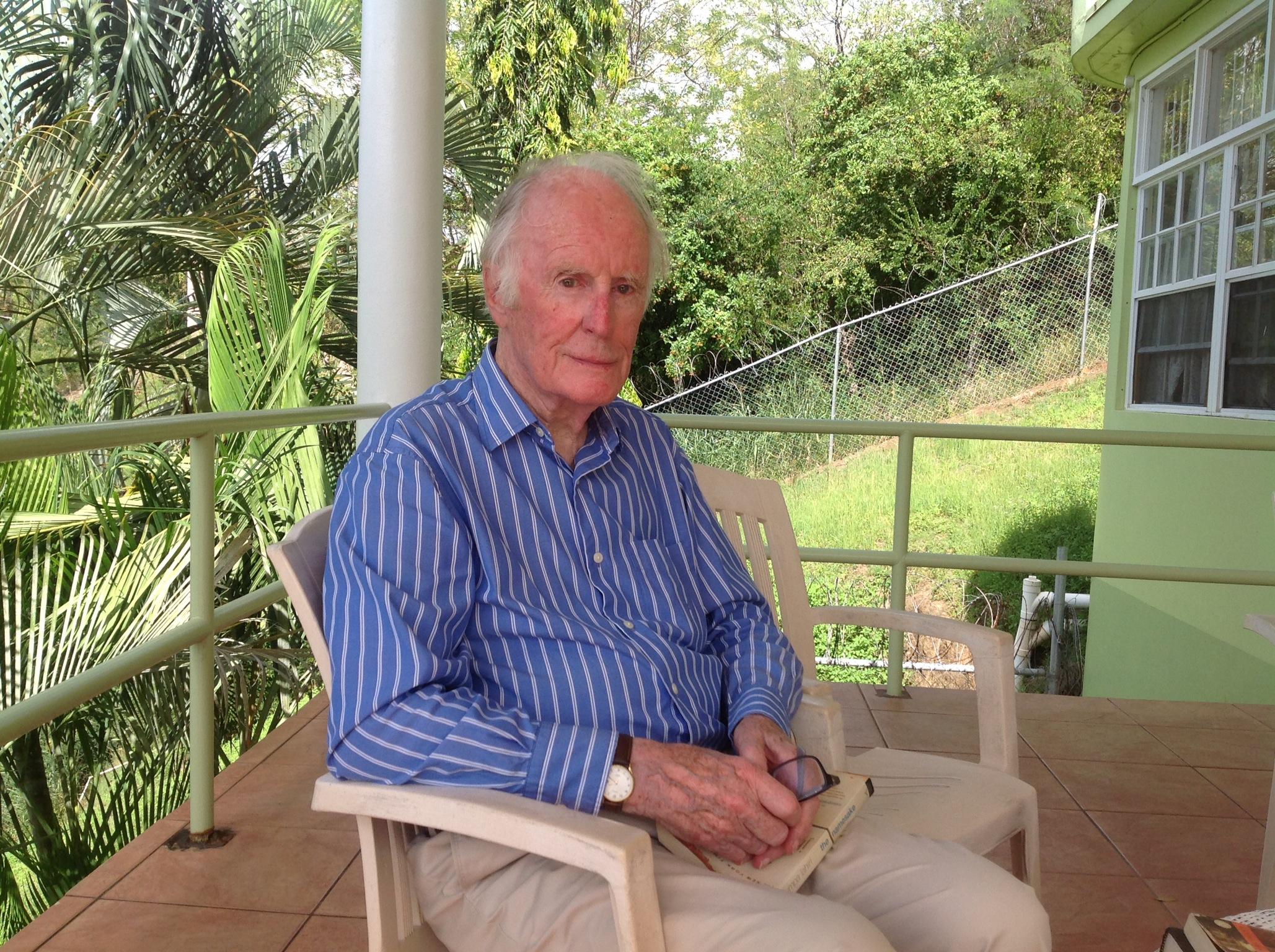
- Catling in 2014
- Born: 14 February 1925; London, England
- Died: 9 January 2026 (aged 100); Bantry, County Cork, Ireland
- Education: Oberlin College
- Occupations: Writer, journalist, book reviewer
- Spouse(s): Susan Barnes Watson (1949–1960); Diane Wheeler Nicholson (1964–1984)
- Children: Charlotte Skene-Catling and 3 others

Patrick Skene Catling (14 February 1925 – 9 January 2026) was a British journalist, author and book reviewer, best known for writing The Chocolate Touch in 1952. He wrote 12 novels, three works of non-fiction and nine books for children.

== Background ==
Catling was born in London, England on 14 February 1925. He was schooled there, before attending Oberlin College in the United States. Catling served in the Royal Canadian Air Force as a navigator and as a journalist at The Baltimore Sun and The Manchester Guardian.

He travelled extensively. Catling continued writing books in his later years, and provided reviews for The Spectator, The Telegraph, and other publications. He later lived in Reenacoppul in the Republic of Ireland. Catling died in Bantry, County Cork, Ireland on 9 January 2026, at the age of 100.

== Career ==
His first publication of The Chocolate Touch in 1952 received enthusiastic responses from several reviewers. Catling has since written dozens of books, and has developed the popular The Chocolate Touch character John Midas into the children's book series: John Midas in the Dreamtime (1986), John Midas and the Vampires (1994), John Midas and the Radio Touch (1994), and John Midas and the Rock Star (1995). Of John Midas in the Dreamtime, School Library Journal wrote, "...children who have been dragged around tourist sights will relate to John's boredom".

== Selected works ==
=== Novels ===
- Tourist Attraction (Macmillan, 1963)
- The Experiment (Anthony Blond, 1968)
- The Exterminator (The Bodley Head, 1969)
- Freddy Hill: The Story of a Modern Man of Pleasure (The Bodley Head, 1969)
- The Catalogue (The Bodley Head, 1970)
- The Surrogate (Rupert Hart-Davis, 1972)
- Best Summer Job (Simon & Schuster, 1974)
- Secret Ingredients (Hart-Davis McGibbon, 1976)
- Bliss Incorporated (Weidenfeld and Nicolson, 1976)
- Freddy Hill in Las Vegas (Panther, 1979)
- Jazz, Jazz, Jazz (Blond and Briggs, 1980)
- Murder Becomes Electra: A Love Story (Somerville Press, 2018)

=== Children's books ===
- The Chocolate Touch (Morrow, 1957)
- John Midas in the Dreamtime (Morrow, 1986)
- The Orphan and the Billionaire (Methuen Young Books, 1990)
- Eskimo Surprise (Mammoth, 1993)
- John Midas and the Radio Touch (Methuen Young Books, 1993)
- A Trunkful of Tricks (Heinemann Young Books, 1994)
- John Midas and the Vampires (Mammoth, 1994)
- John Midas and the Rock Star (Egmont Children's Books, 1995)
- Chocolate Magic (Mammoth, 2000)

=== Non-fiction ===
- Better Than Working (Faber & Faber, 1960)
- The Right End of the Stick (Faber & Faber, 1963)
- The Joy of Freeloading (Bloomsbury, 1990)
- Harassment: Memoirs of a Sex Object (Bloomsbury, 1993)

=== Journalism ===
- "Rich pickings". The Spectator. 311 (9446): 34, 36. 12 September 2009. Archived from the original on 1 December 2011. Review of Gardam, Jane (2009). The man in the wooden hat. Chatto. ISBN 978-0-7011-7798-0.
