= Acton Turville =

Civil parish in Gloucestershire, England

Coordinates: 51.526°N 2.276°W

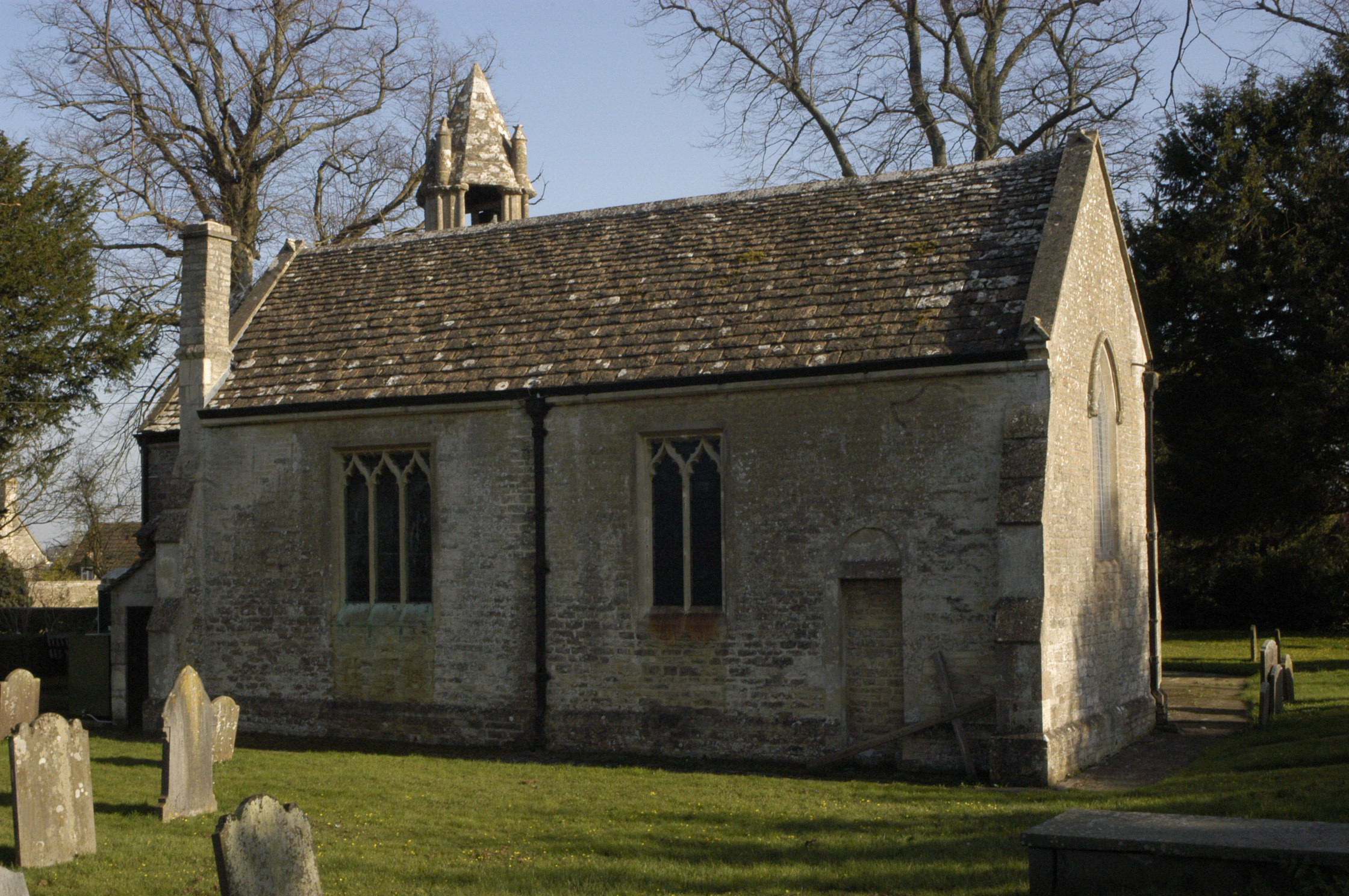
- St Mary's Church, Acton Turville

- Location within Gloucestershire
- Population: 370
- OS grid reference: ST8084480865
- Civil parish: Acton Turville
- Unitary authority: South Gloucestershire
- Ceremonial county: Gloucestershire
- Region: South West
- Country: England
- Sovereign state: United Kingdom
- Post town: Badminton
- Postcode district: GL9
- Dialling code: 01454
- Police: Avon and Somerset
- Fire: Avon
- Ambulance: South Western
- UK Parliament: Thornbury & Yate

Acton Turville is a parish in the Cotswold Edge ward within South Gloucestershire, England. It lies 17 miles (27 km) east-northeast of Bristol. The M4 is south of the parish. Acton Turville consists of a cluster of households across 1,009 acres, with a total population of 370 people.

According to John Marius in 1870, From the imperial gazetteer of England and Wales - Acton Turville is: "a parish in Chipping Sodbury district, Gloucester; near the Fosse way and under the Cotswold Hills. It lies 5.5 miles east of Chipping Sodbury, and 7.5 miles east of Yate railway station".

== Name ==
Acton Turville is also listed as "Achetone" in the Domesday Book. The meaning of which in Old English (āc + tūn) translates to 'settlement by the oak.' The Turville element of the name comes from Robert Turevil (of the Norman Tourvilles) who owned the land in 1236.

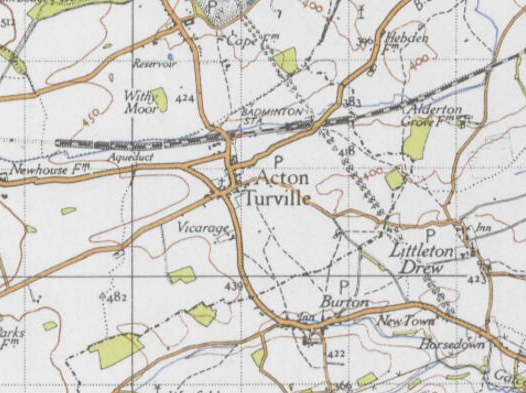
Ordnance Survey of the Parish of Acton Turville located in Gloucestershire.

== Geography ==
The source of the Avon is just north of the village.

== History ==
=== The Parish Church ===
The Parish Church St, Mary's is dated back to the 12th century and is Grade II* listed. According to the Church of England, in the Diocese of Gloucester "minor alterations were made in the 13th century and again in the 15th century". And, in 1853 with the help of architect T. H. Wyatt, enlarged the parish church that was so central to the parish, due to a population increase within the parish. The church's stained glass windows were "due to the generosity of a few local benefactors", which were finely designed by some of the "leading studios of the day". The most notable benefactor in the parish - Reverend R H Mullens, who was appointed vicar in 1869, made a very generous donation to St Mary's Church in his retirement in 1911. One stained glass window was presented in memory of his wife. As the monarchy was restored, the presentation of a royal coat of arms was made compulsory, asserting a royal "supremacy" within the church. St Mary's Church coat of arms reflects George III monarchy, dated 1801–1816.

== Population ==
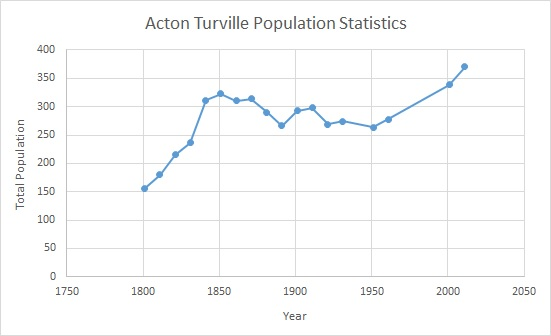

From the 1800s, population evidently began to rise until it reached a total of 175 residents in 1850. This can be explained by the events occurring in Gloucester in the 1800s, where city boundaries were beginning to be breached, and a population increase was beginning to take place in surrounding rural areas. Evidently, in 1852 suburbs were reported to be "extending" a considerable distance and villages and parishes such as Acton Turville, were beginning to increase up to six times more than the population a hundred earlier. Acton Turville's sudden increase in population can also be explained by the introduction of industry in the area, where new canals and railways were promoted. Following this, there was a significant decrease in population around the 1900s, where population was 20% lower than it was in 1850, possibly due to expansion in other surrounding areas. However, we see an exponential increase from 1950 to 2000, where population peaks at 370 residents, which to date, is the current population of Acton Turville.

== Religion and ethnicity ==
The 2001 census data, show Acton Turville to have a population of 328 British/Irish, and very small number of other ethnicity groups. The ward of Cotswold Edge however, presents a much more diverse range of results with a total of 78 residents from other ethnic groups such as; Irish, "other" White, "other" Mixed, Caribbean and Chinese. According to the 2011 census data, 72% are Christian, 18% have no specified religion and the remaining 8% state no religion at all.

== Economy ==
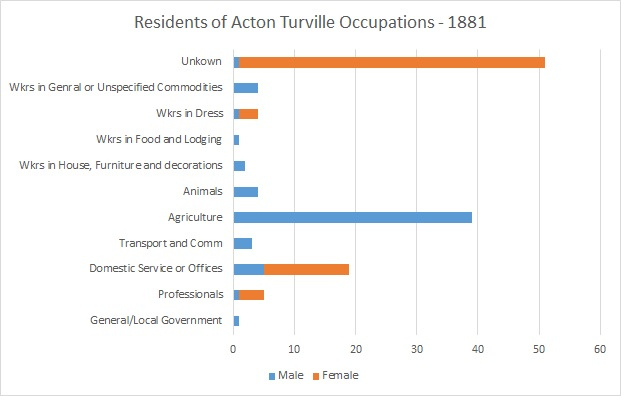

In the first census in 1801, Britain saw a great increase in international trade. A global introduction to trading is a fact that reflects on occupational change in such small villages such as Acton Turville. In the 1831 occupational statistics, where industrialisation is beginning, 0 residents were employed in the manufacturing industry, whereas 44 were employed in the agricultural sector. Women however, were extremely domesticated or under an "unspecified" occupation. In the following census data, 50 years later in 1881, more industrialised sectors appeared. The transport and communications sector had a total of 3 residents, where occupations such as "dress", "professionals", "domestic service and offices", and "workers in house, furniture and decorations" had increased with both male and female employees. In this 50 year difference, those employed in agriculture had decreased by 5, showing a progressive shift in industry. Evidence for this can also be reflected in the decline of servants which could explain the rising affluence within Acton Turville. Presently, a total of 6 residents are in the agricultural field, and a high number in education, real estate, manufacturing and retail in accordance with the 2001 census data.

== Transport ==
Public transport in Acton Turville is limited, with the main transport link being the local bus service. The local bus service is named "Coachstyle", with a total of 12 bus links between locations such as: Bath, Bathwick, Yate, Malmesbury, Chippenham, Badminton and Hullavington. The nearest train stations are Yate and Chippenham which are around 7–8 miles away from the parish. According to the 2001 census data, only 6% of households in the parish are without a car/van. This shows evidence for the lack of reliance on public transport, whereas the result of those reliant on personal transport is a high result of 88.6%.
