= Steve Webb =

British pensions commentator

The Right Honourable Sir Steve Webb
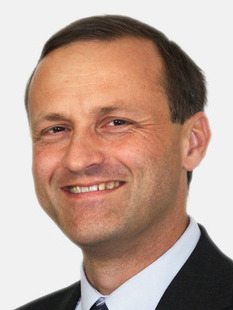

Minister of State for Pensions
- In office 12 May 2010 – 8 May 2015
- Prime Minister: David Cameron
- Preceded by: Angela Eagle
- Succeeded by: The Baroness Altmann

Member of Parliament for Thornbury and Yate Northavon (1997–2010)
- In office 1 May 1997 – 30 March 2015
- Preceded by: John Cope
- Succeeded by: Luke Hall

Personal details
- Born: 18 July 1965 (age 61) Birmingham, Warwickshire, England
- Party: Liberal Democrats
- Spouse(s): Helen, Lady Webb (m. 1993)
- Children: 2
- Education: Hertford College, Oxford
- Profession: Academic

Sir Steven John Webb PC (born 18 July 1965) is a British pensions commentator who was previously Liberal Democrat Member of Parliament (MP) for Northavon from 1997 to 2010 and for Thornbury and Yate from 2010 to 2015. He was the Minister of State for Pensions in the coalition government of David Cameron.

== Background ==
Webb was born in Birmingham to Brian and Patricia Webb, and attended the local comprehensive school, Dartmouth High School, before going on to study philosophy, politics and economics at Hertford College, Oxford. He then worked at the Institute for Fiscal Studies in London, where he specialised in researching into poverty, taxes and benefits. In 1995, he became a professor of social policy at the University of Bath.

== Political career ==
At the 1997 general election, Webb was elected as MP for Northavon, just north of Bristol, overturning a Conservative majority of over 11,000. He increased a 2,137 majority to 9,877 in the 2001 election and again to 11,033 in the 2005 election.

In 2001, Webb was promoted by Charles Kennedy to lead spokesperson for the Liberal Democrats on Work and Pensions, a portfolio he had worked in since 1999. He continued in this position until being appointed as Liberal Democrat Health spokesperson in 2005. At the end of 2006, he started a new role co-ordinating the party's manifesto for the next general election. In the first reshuffle after the leadership election, he was appointed Liberal Democrat Environment, Energy, Food and Rural Affairs spokesman. Following Gordon Brown's reshuffle in October 2008, he shadowed Ed Miliband in the newly formed Department of Energy and Climate Change. On 8 January 2009 Nick Clegg announced his "General Election Team" and an "economic recovery group" with Webb appointed as Work and Pensions spokesman.

Webb was also a member of the cross-party Christians in Parliament, and vice-president of the Liberal Democrat Christian Forum. He was one of the first MPs to have a blog and a website, and in 2004, his website, which made use of SMS technology, was commended in the New Statesman New Media Awards and, in February 2005, led him to win the inaugural Hansard Society E-Democracy Award. He also recognised the emerging potential of online social networks by joining Myspace and Facebook, two of the biggest social media websites at the time. He was one of the contributors to The Orange Book (2004) and is the author of a chapter in The Future of the NHS.

Given his increasing profile and popularity within the party due to his role as the manifesto chair, he was seen as a probable candidate for the social liberal grouping's vote in the future leadership election. Simon Hughes had been the previous 'standard bearer' in the leadership elections in 1999 and 2006. On 17 October 2007, the website Bloggers4Steve announced that Webb had received enough nominations from MPs to run. Despite this, on 18 October, Webb announced he was not running, and would be backing Nick Clegg for leader, who was ultimately the successful candidate.

At the 2010 general election, the constituency of Northavon was split into two new constituencies. Subsequently, Webb was elected for the new Thornbury and Yate constituency, which covers most of the ground originally covered by Northavon.

In a letter dated 12 April 2010, Webb said on behalf of the Liberal Democrats: "We are very clear that all accrued rights should be honoured: a pension promise made should be a pension promise kept. Therefore we would not make any changes to pension rights that have already been built up. I have confirmed that I regard accrued index-linked rights as protected." However, in July 2010, as the Coalition Minister for Works and Pensions, Webb announced plans to link private sector pension payments to the Consumer Prices Index (CPI) instead of the Retail Prices Index (RPI), which would reduce the value of fully accrued index-linked pensions.

As Pensions Minister in the Coalition government, Webb led major changes to the pensions system. The pensions 'triple-lock' guarantees that the state pension rises each year by the highest of inflation, earnings or 2.5%. One year this resulted in the highest ever cash increase in the state pension, and saw pensioners who were receiving the full state pension £380 a year better off.

In Autumn 2012, auto-enrolment was introduced for large businesses in the UK, being rolled out to smaller businesses over the next four years. Auto-enrolment automatically enrols employees into a contributory pension scheme, unless they opt out. Estimates suggest that 600,000 people were auto-enrolled by the end of 2013, and that by 2014, £11M per year would be added to the total UK investment in pensions,

Webb attracted media attention in March 2014, when he remarked in a television interview that due to the coalition government's pension reforms, he was relaxed if pensioners wanted to spend their savings on a Lamborghini.

In the May 2015 general election, he lost his seat to the Conservative Luke Hall.

== Subsequent career ==
Webb was knighted in the 2017 New Year Honours.

In August 2015, it was announced Webb was becoming director of policy and external communications at the financial services mutual Royal London. Parliamentary rules prevented Webb from direct political lobbying for the first two years. In 2020, Webb left Royal London to take up a partner role at the consultancy Lane Clark and Peacock.

A freedom of information inquiry tabled by Webb in 2020 revealed that a large number of women were being paid state pensions below the expected rate. Some 200,000 women could now be in line for payouts averaging £13,500 to top-up the underpayment of their state pension.

== Personal life ==
On 10 July 1993, Webb married Helen, a curate at his local church in Clapham, south London. A year later, the couple moved to Bristol; they have two children.

Parliament of the United Kingdom
Preceded by John Cope	Member of Parliament for Northavon; 1997–2010	Succeeded by Constituency Abolished
Preceded by Constituency Created	Member of Parliament for Thornbury and Yate; 2010–2015	Succeeded by Luke Hall
Political offices
Preceded by Angela Eagle	Minister of State for Pensions; 2010–2015	Succeeded by Baroness Altmann
