= John Cope, Baron Cope of Berkeley =

British politician (born 1937)

The Right Honourable The Lord Cope of Berkeley PC
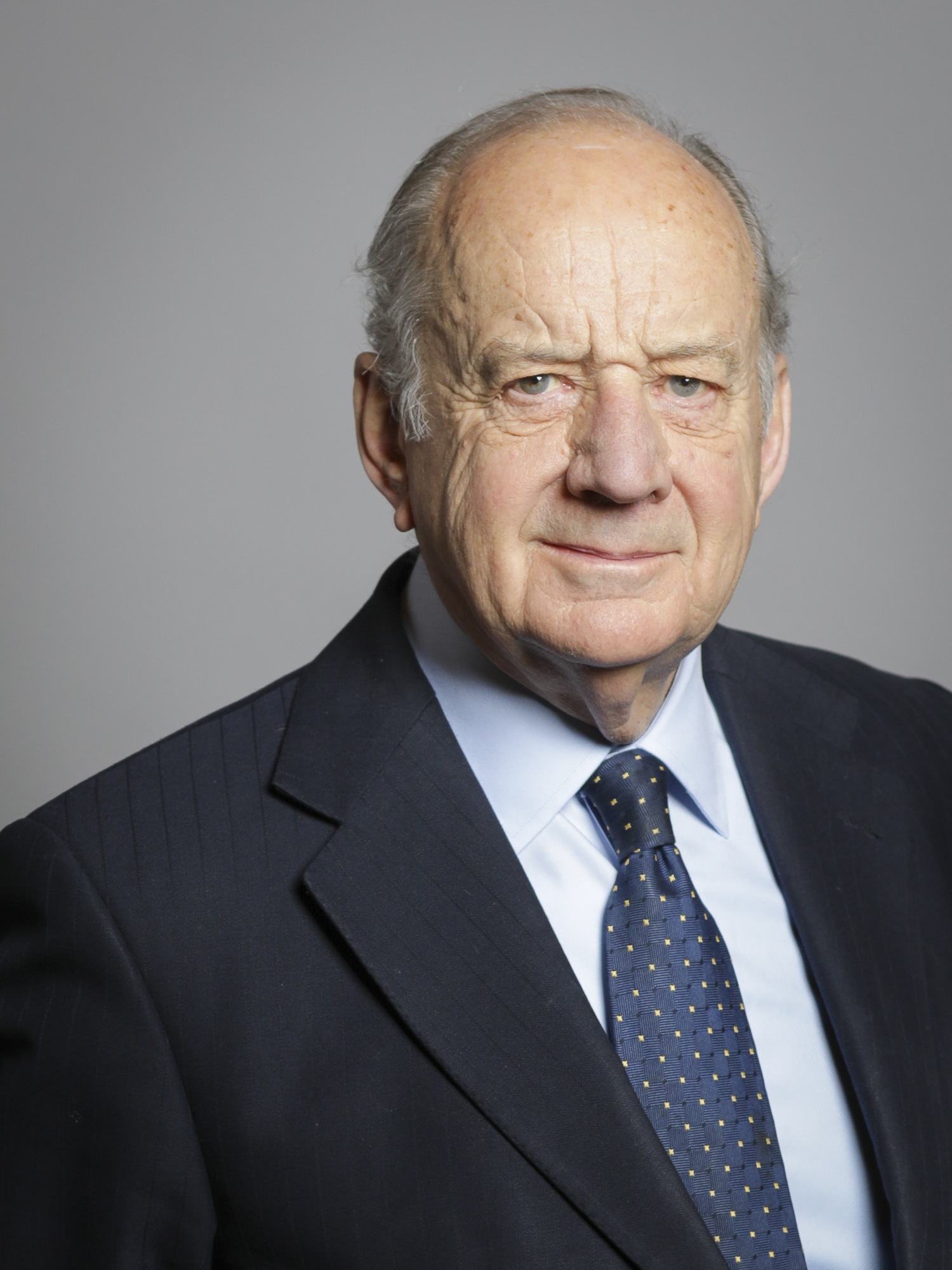

Opposition Chief Whip of the House of Lords
- In office 18 September 2001 – 2 July 2007
- Leader: Iain Duncan Smith; Michael Howard; David Cameron
- Preceded by: The Lord Henley
- Succeeded by: The Baroness Anelay of St John's

Paymaster General
- In office 14 April 1992 – 20 July 1994
- Prime Minister: John Major
- Preceded by: The Lord Belstead
- Succeeded by: David Heathcoat-Amory

Deputy Chairman and Treasurer of the Conservative Party
- In office 1 November 1990 – 1 April 1992
- Prime Minister: Margaret Thatcher; John Major
- Preceded by: David Trippier
- Succeeded by: Angela Rumbold

Minister of State for Northern Ireland
- In office 25 July 1989 – 28 November 1990
- Prime Minister: Margaret Thatcher
- Preceded by: Ian Stewart
- Succeeded by: Brian Mawhinney; The Lord Belstead

Minister of State for Employment
- In office 13 June 1987 – 25 July 1989
- Prime Minister: Margaret Thatcher
- Preceded by: Kenneth Clarke
- Succeeded by: Tim Eggar

Deputy Chief Whip Treasurer of the Household
- In office 11 June 1983 – 15 June 1987
- Prime Minister: Margaret Thatcher
- Preceded by: Anthony Berry
- Succeeded by: David Hunt

Lord Commissioner of the Treasury
- In office 9 January 1981 – 13 June 1983
- Prime Minister: Margaret Thatcher
- Preceded by: John MacGregor

Assistant Whip
- In office 16 May 1979 – 9 January 1981
- Prime Minister: Margaret Thatcher
- Preceded by: James Tinn

Member of Parliament for Northavon South Gloucestershire (1974–1983)
- In office 28 February 1974 – 8 April 1997
- Preceded by: Frederick Corfield
- Succeeded by: Steve Webb

Member of the House of Lords
- Lord Temporal
- Life peerage 4 October 1997 – 13 May 2020

Personal details
- Born: 13 May 1937 (age 89)
- Party: Conservative
- Education: Oakham School

John Ambrose Cope, Baron Cope of Berkeley, PC (born 13 May 1937) is a Conservative Party politician in the United Kingdom.

== Education ==
Cope was educated at Oakham School before qualifying as a Chartered Accountant.

== Career ==
Cope contested Woolwich East in the 1970 general election, but was defeated by Labour's Christopher Mayhew. Thereafter he served as Member of Parliament for South Gloucestershire from 1974 to 1983. When that constituency was abolished for the 1983 general election, he was returned for the new Northavon constituency, serving until his defeat in the 1997 general election by the Liberal Democrat Steve Webb. Within the Conservative Party, he was an Assistant Whip from June 1979 to June 1981.

His first political office was as a Lord Commissioner of the Treasury (June 1981 to June 1983), and then he was Treasurer of HM Household (1983–1987), and was then appointed Minister of State for Employment (with a special focus on small businesses) 1987–1989. He was then Minister of State for Security and Finance at the Northern Ireland Office until November 1990. In the meantime, in 1988, he was sworn as a member of the Privy Council. Cope served as Deputy Chairman and Treasurer of the Conservative Party from 1 November 1990, succeeding David Trippier. He was succeeded by Dame Angela Rumbold on 1 April 1992. Cope served as Paymaster General (HM Treasury) in John Major's government between 1992 and 1994.

He was made a life peer as Baron Cope of Berkeley, of Berkeley in the County of Gloucestershire on 4 October 1997. He served as Opposition Chief Whip in the House of Lords, on the Conservative front bench, from 2001 to 2007, when he was replaced by Baroness Anelay.

His daughter Lucy was formerly married to Jack Lopresti, who was Member of Parliament for Filton and Bradley Stoke, one of Northavon's successor seats.

In 2012, Cope made the opening speech to the House of Lords, presenting a motion for the Loyal Address on the opening day of Parliament.

He retired from the House of Lords on 13 May 2020, his 83rd birthday.

== Charity work ==
Cope is a patron of the charity Kids for Kids, helping children in rural areas of Darfur, Sudan. He is a patron of The West of England MS Therapy Centre, a charity helping those in Bristol and the surrounding areas live independent lives whilst coping with MS and other neurological conditions, Cope is also President of the Friends of the Royal National Hospital for Rheumatic Diseases in Bath.

Cope has also been a Trustee of War Memorials Trust since 1999; this is a conservation charity that works for the protection of war memorials across the United Kingdom.

Parliament of the United Kingdom
| Preceded by Frederick Corfield | Member of Parliament for South Gloucestershire; 1974–1983 | Constituency abolished |
| New constituency | Member of Parliament for Northavon; 1983–1997 | Succeeded by Steve Webb |
Political offices
| Preceded by James Tinn | Assistant Whip; 1979–1981 | Succeeded by |
| Preceded by John MacGregor | Lord Commissioner of the Treasury; 1981–1983 | Succeeded by |
| Preceded by Anthony Berry | Deputy Chief Whip of the House of Commons; Treasurer of the Household; 1983–1987 | Succeeded by David Hunt |
| Preceded by Kenneth Clarke | Minister of State for Employment; 1987–1989 | Succeeded by Tim Eggar |
| Preceded by Ian Stewart | Minister of State for Northern Ireland; 1989–1990 | Succeeded by Brian Mawhinney; The Lord Belstead |
| Preceded by The Lord Belstead | Paymaster General; 1992–1994 | Succeeded by David Heathcoat-Amory |
| Preceded by The Lord Henley | Opposition Chief Whip of the House of Lords; 2001–2007 | Succeeded by The Baroness Anelay of St John's |
Party political offices
| Preceded by Anthony Berry | Conservative Deputy Chief Whip in the House of Commons; 1983–1987 | Succeeded by David Hunt |
| Preceded by David Trippier | Deputy Chairman and Treasurer of the Conservative Party; 1990–1992 | Succeeded by Dame Angela Rumbold |
| Preceded by The Lord Henley | Conservative Chief Whip of the House of Lords; 2001–2007 | Succeeded by The Baroness Anelay of St John's |
Orders of precedence in the United Kingdom
| Preceded by The Lord Sainsbury of Turville | Gentlemen; Baron Cope of Berkeley | Succeeded by The Lord Hunt of Kings Heath |
