= South Gloucestershire (constituency) =

Former parliamentary constituency in the United Kingdom

- Former county constituency for the House of Commons
- South Gloucestershire, showing boundaries used from 1974-1983

1950–1983
- Seats: one
- Created from: Stroud and Thornbury
- Replaced by: Northavon, Bristol North West, Stroud

South Gloucestershire, also known as Gloucestershire South, was a parliamentary constituency in Gloucestershire. It returned one Member of Parliament (MP) to the House of Commons of the Parliament of the United Kingdom.

The constituency was created for the 1950 general election, and abolished for the 1983 general election. It had three different sets of boundaries during its existence, and elected a new MP on each one of those occasions.

== Boundaries ==
1950–1955: The Urban Districts of Kingswood and Mangotsfield, and the Rural Districts of Sodbury and Warmley.

1955–1974: The Rural Districts of Sodbury, Thornbury, and Warmley. Thornbury Rural District was added to the seat from the abolished Stroud and Thornbury constituency.

1974–1983: The Rural Districts of Sodbury and Thornbury. Warmley Rural District was transferred to the new Kingswood constituency.

== Predecessor and successor constituencies ==
From 1885 to 1950 much of the area of the constituency was represented by the Thornbury constituency, and from 1950 to 1955 by Stroud and Thornbury.

When the constituency was abolished in 1983, 80.54% of it was transferred to the new constituency of Northavon, 14.75% to the redrawn Bristol North West and 4.70% to the redrawn Stroud.

== Members of Parliament ==
Election	Member	Party
1950	Anthony Crosland	Labour
1955	Sir Frederick Corfield	Conservative
Feb 1974	John Cope	Conservative
1983	constituency abolished: see Northavon	

== Elections ==
=== Elections in the 1970s ===
General election 1979: South Gloucestershire
Party	Candidate	Votes	%	±%
Conservative	John Cope	35,627	51.2	+9.2
Labour	MK Mullins	20,465	29.4	−5.8
Liberal	George Conrad	12,850	18.5	−4.3
Ecology	David Kerridge	695	1.0	New
Majority		15,162	21.8	+15.0
Turnout		69,637	82.1	+2.5
Registered electors		84,867		+6.9
Conservative hold		Swing	+7.4	

General election October 1974: South Gloucestershire
Party	Candidate	Votes	%	±%
Conservative	John Cope	26,581	42.0	+0.2
Labour	Oonagh McDonald	22,235	35.2	+3.2
Liberal	DC Short	14,412	22.8	−3.4
Majority		4,346	6.8	−3.0
Turnout		63,228	79.6	−4.2
Registered electors		79,419		+0.8
Conservative hold		Swing	-1.5	

General election February 1974: South Gloucestershire
Party	Candidate	Votes	%	±%
Conservative	John Cope	27,602	41.8	−10.5
Labour	Oonagh McDonald	21,143	32.0	−4.5
Liberal	DC Short	17,276	26.2	+15.0
Majority		6,459	9.8	−6.1
Turnout		66,021	83.8	+5.6
Registered electors		78,766		+9.6
Conservative hold		Swing	-3.0	

General election 1970: South Gloucestershire
Party	Candidate	Votes	%	±%
Conservative	Frederick Corfield	35,045	50.9	+5.7
Labour	Michael George Dalling	26,067	37.9	−5.0
Liberal	Anthony Lambert	7,680	11.2	−0.7
Majority		8,978	13.0	+10.7
Turnout		68,792	78.6	−5.8
Registered electors		87,503		+18.2
Conservative hold		Swing	+5.4	

=== Elections in the 1960s ===
General election 1966: South Gloucestershire
Party	Candidate	Votes	%	±%
Conservative	Frederick Corfield	28,224	45.2	−0.6
Labour	Michael Cocks	26,800	42.9	+3.5
Liberal	Eric Cleaton Hart	7,421	11.9	−3.0
Majority		1,424	2.3	−4.1
Turnout		62,445	84.4	+0.2
Registered electors		74,023		+7.6
Conservative hold		Swing	-2.1	

General election 1964: South Gloucestershire
Party	Candidate	Votes	%	±%
Conservative	Frederick Corfield	26,504	45.8	−9.0
Labour	Michael Cocks	22,790	39.4	−5.8
Liberal	Brian S Sherriff	8,611	14.9	New
Majority		3,714	6.4	−3.2
Turnout		57,905	84.2	+0.5
Registered electors		68,781		+20.6
Conservative hold		Swing	-1.6	

=== Elections in the 1950s ===
General election 1959: South Gloucestershire
Party	Candidate	Votes	%	±%
Conservative	Frederick Corfield	26,168	54.8	+2.7
Labour	Joseph Holland	21,567	45.2	−2.8
Majority		4,601	9.6	+4.9
Turnout		47,735	83.7	+2.0
Registered electors		57,026		+11.5
Conservative hold		Swing	+2.8	

General election 1955: South Gloucestershire
Party	Candidate	Votes	%	±%
Conservative	Frederick Corfield	21,760	52.1	+7.4
Labour	Edward Bishop	20,034	47.4	−7.4
Majority		1,726	4.7	N/A
Turnout		41,794	81.7	−4.6
Registered electors		51,166		−12.2
Conservative gain from Labour		Swing	+7.4	

General election 1951: South Gloucestershire
Party	Candidate	Votes	%	±%
Labour	Anthony Crosland	27,808	55.3	+6.5
Conservative	Marjorie Hickling	22,470	44.7	+8.1
Majority		5,338	10.6	−1.6
Turnout		50,278	86.2	−0.7
Registered electors		58,296		+1.1
Labour hold		Swing	-0.8	

General election 1950: South Gloucestershire
Party	Candidate	Votes	%	±%
Labour	Anthony Crosland	24,458	48.8	
Conservative	B. Davidson	18,320	36.6	
Liberal	Stafford Vaughan Stepney Howard	7,342	14.6	
Majority		6,138	12.2	
Turnout		50,120	86.9	
Registered electors		57,689		
Labour win (new seat)				
