= Jessie Raven Crosland =

Jessie Crosland (née Raven; 17 November 1879 – 16 June 1973) was a scholar of medieval French literature, Lecturer in French at Westfield College.

== Life ==
Jessie Raven was the youngest daughter of the Plymouth Brethren preacher Frederick Edward Raven (1837–1903). She married Joseph Beardsall Crosland, a civil servant whom she met through the Brethren, in 1904. In 1921, she accompanied her husband to the Cairo Conference on the Middle East, later relating her recollections of Winston Churchill's behaviour at the conference:

When things were boring in the Hotel everyone would cheer up when Winston came in, followed by an Arab carrying a pail and a bottle of wine ... [Churchill] was unpopular with the Egyptians – many carriages had notices "à bas Churchill" – but he didn't care. He took his easel and sat in the road painting – he also talked so loudly in the street that the generals got quite nervous. He was always telling people not to give up their painting. He didn't like Arabs coming into the Hotel, not even into the garden.

She retired in 1946–47. Her son was the politician Anthony Crosland (29 August 1918 – 19 February 1977). She died on 16 June 1973, in Merton, London.

== Works ==
- (tr.) The song of Roland. London: Chatto & Windus, 1907. With an introduction by Louis Brandin.
- (ed.) Guibert d'Andrenas, chanson de geste. Manchester: University Press, 1923.
- (tr.) Raoul de Cambrai, an old French feudal epic. London: Chatto & Windus, 1926.
- The Old French epic. Oxford: Blackwell, 1951.
- Medieval French literature. Oxford: Blackwell, 1956.
- Outlaws in fact and fiction. London: P. Owen, 1959.
- William the Marshal: the last great feudal baron. London: P. Owen, 1962.
- (tr.) 'On the performance of Beethoven's symphonies' by Felix Weingartner. In Weingartner on music & conducting: three essays. New York: Dover Publications, 1969.
- Sir John Fastolfe: a medieval 'Man of property'. London: Owen, 1970.
