= Better Than Working =

Memoir by Patrick Catling

- Author: Patrick Skene Catling
- Genre: Memoir
- Publication date: 1960

Better Than Working is an autobiography or memoir written by Patrick Skene Catling, first published in 1960. It describes Catling's work in journalism and his love life.
