= Thornbury and Yate =

UK Parliament constituency (since 2010)

Coordinates: 51.573°N 2.477°W

- County constituency for the House of Commons
- Interactive map of boundaries since 2024
- Boundary of Thornbury and Yate in South West England
- County: Gloucestershire
- Electorate: 74,935 (2023)
- Major settlements: Thornbury, Yate and Chipping Sodbury

Current constituency
- Created: 2010
- Member of Parliament: Claire Young (Liberal Democrats)
- Seats: One
- Created from: Northavon

Thornbury and Yate is a constituency (Note: A county constituency (for the purposes of election expenses and type of returning officer)) encompassing an area to the north-east of Bristol within the South Gloucestershire Unitary Authority Area. It is represented in the House of Commons of the UK Parliament since the 2024 election by Claire Young, a member of the Liberal Democrats. (Note: As with all constituencies, the constituency elects one Member of Parliament (MP) by the first past the post system of election at least every five years.)

== Constituency profile ==
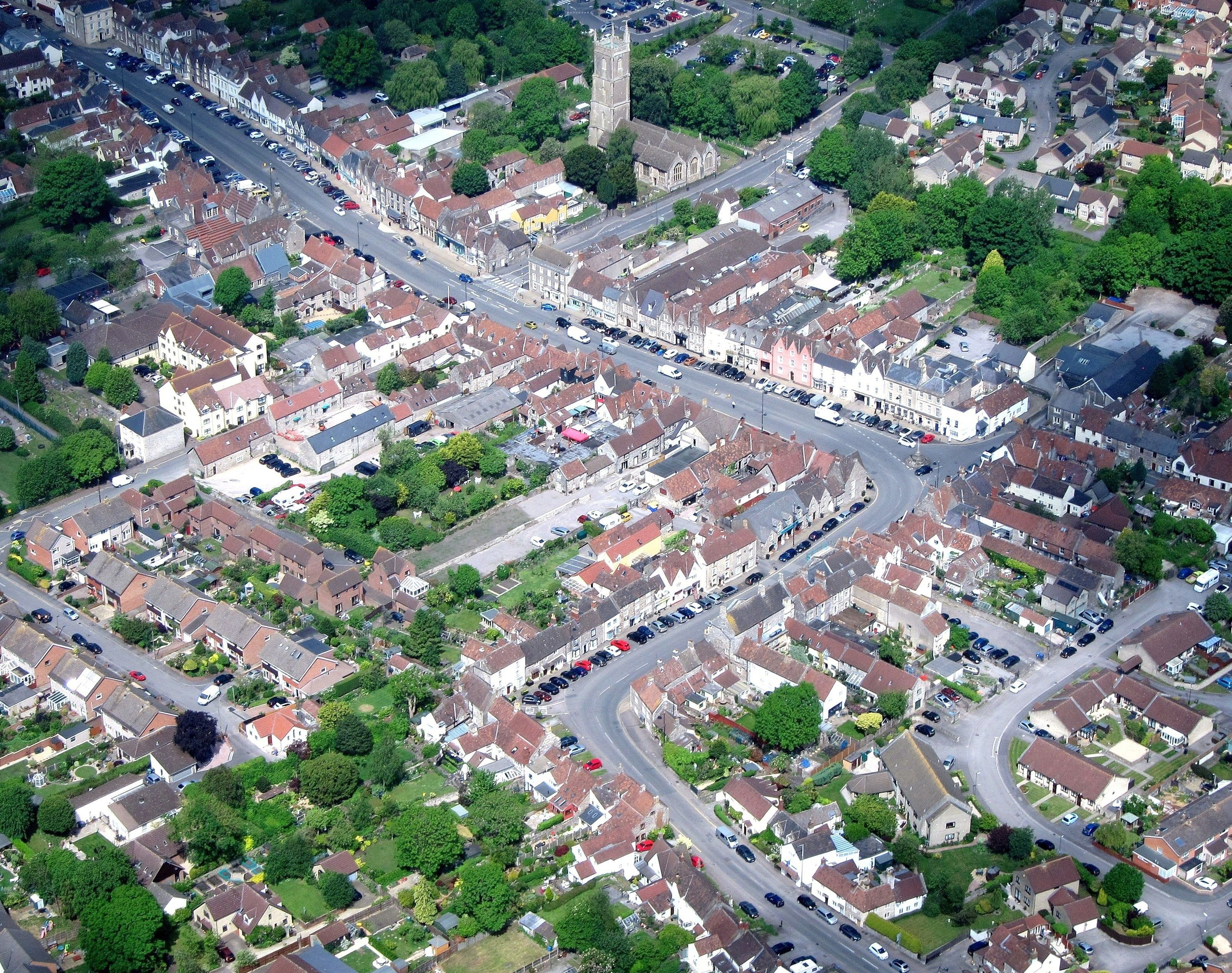
Chipping Sodbury

Thornbury and Yate is a constituency in Gloucestershire in South West England. Its largest town is Yate, which has a population of around 31,000. Other settlements include the towns of Thornbury and Chipping Sodbury and the villages of Frampton Cotterell, Charfield and Almondsbury.

This constituency covers the towns and villages to the north of Bristol. Yate was a small village until it was developed as a suburban commuter town in the mid 20th century. Yate and Frampton Cotterell are located within the Bristol Coalfield and have a history of mining. Thornbury and Chipping Sodbury are historic, small market towns; the latter lies on the edge of the Cotswolds. The constituency is mostly affluent, particularly in Thornbury which has very low levels of deprivation. House prices across the constituency are generally higher than the regional and UK averages.

Thornbury and Yate has a large retired population and a below-average proportion of young adults. Residents have high levels of income and homeownership and the child poverty rate is low. They have average levels of education and a high proportion work in the transport and manufacturing sectors. The percentage of residents claiming unemployment benefits is low. White people made up 96% of the population at the 2021 census.

At the local council, most of this constituency is represented by Liberal Democrats with some Conservatives elected in the rural villages. An estimated 50% of voters in Thornbury and Yate supported leaving the European Union in the 2016 referendum, marginally lower than the UK-wide figure of 52%.

== History ==
This seat is a successor to the former Northavon constituency, which was abolished following boundary changes taking effect at the 2010 general election.

The constituency was one of a significant number gained from the Liberal Democrats by the Conservatives in the 2015 general election, and their majority further increased to more than 12,000 in the 2017 election, even as the Conservatives saw a net loss of seats nationally. The Liberal Democrats regained the seat at the 2024 general election.

== Boundaries ==
Map of boundaries 2010 to 2024

2010–2024: Following the Fifth Periodic Review of Westminster constituencies by the Boundary Commission this newly defined seat emerged. The electoral wards used in the creation of this new seat were all from the district of South Gloucestershire and were as follows:

- Alveston
- Boyd Valley (includes Marshfield, Pucklechurch and Wick)
- Charfield
- Cromhall
- Chipping Sodbury
- Cotswold Edge (includes Hawkesbury Upton and Acton Turville)
- Dodington
- Frampton Cotterell
- Ladden Brook (includes Wickwar)
- Severn – Aust
- Thornbury North
- Thornbury South
- Westerleigh
- Yate Central
- Yate North
- Yate West

Ward names and boundaries were subsequently reconfigured by the South Gloucestershire (Electoral Changes) Order 2018 which came into effect in 2019.

2024–present: Further to the 2023 Periodic Review of Westminster constituencies which came into effect for the 2024 general election, the constituency is composed of the following (as they existed on 1 December 2020):

- The District of South Gloucestershire wards of: Boyd Valley; Charfield; Chipping Sodbury & Cotswold Edge; Dodington; Frampton Cotterell; Pilning & Severn Beach; Severn Vale; Thornbury; Yate Central; Yate North.

The seat was expanded to bring the electorate within the permitted range, with the addition of areas in the Bristol Channel hinterland including Severn Beach from Filton and Bradley Stoke.

== Members of Parliament ==
| Election | Member | Party |
|---|---|---|
| 2010 | Steve Webb | Liberal Democrat |
| 2015 | Luke Hall | Conservative |
| 2024 | Claire Young | Liberal Democrat |

== Elections ==
=== Elections in the 2020s ===
General election 2024: Thornbury and Yate
| Party | Candidate | Votes | % | ±% |
|---|---|---|---|---|
| Liberal Democrats | Claire Young | 20,815 | 39.0 | +6.4 |
| Conservative | Luke Hall | 17,801 | 33.4 | –25.1 |
| Reform | Andrew Banwell | 7,529 | 14.1 | N/A |
| Labour | Rob Logan | 5,057 | 9.5 | +0.8 |
| Green | Alexandra Jenner-Fust | 2,165 | 4.1 | +3.9 |
| Majority | | 3,014 | 5.6 | N/A |
| Turnout | | 53,367 | 68.3 | −6.5 |
| Registered electors | | 78,195 | | |
| Liberal Democrats gain from Conservative | | Swing | ▲15.8 | |

=== Elections in the 2010s ===
2019 notional result
| Party | Vote | % |
|---|---|---|
| Conservative | 32,798 | 58.5 |
| Liberal Democrats | 18,260 | 32.6 |
| Labour | 4,899 | 8.7 |
| Green | 126 | 0.2 |
| Turnout | 56,083 | 74.8 |
| Electorate | 74,935 | |

General election 2019: Thornbury and Yate
| Party | Candidate | Votes | % | ±% |
|---|---|---|---|---|
| Conservative | Luke Hall | 30,202 | 57.8 | +2.5 |
| Liberal Democrats | Claire Young | 17,833 | 34.1 | +2.7 |
| Labour | Rob Logan | 4,208 | 8.1 | −4.0 |
| Majority | | 12,369 | 23.7 | −0.2 |
| Turnout | | 52,243 | 75.2 | +0.6 |
| Registered electors | | 69,492 | | |
| Conservative hold | | Swing | -0.1 | |

General election 2017: Thornbury and Yate
| Party | Candidate | Votes | % | ±% |
|---|---|---|---|---|
| Conservative | Luke Hall | 28,008 | 55.3 | +14.3 |
| Liberal Democrats | Claire Young | 15,937 | 31.4 | −6.5 |
| Labour | Brian Mead | 6,112 | 12.1 | +4.3 |
| Green | Iain Hamilton | 633 | 1.2 | −1.5 |
| Majority | | 12,071 | 23.9 | +20.8 |
| Turnout | | 50,690 | 74.6 | +0.9 |
| Registered electors | | 67,927 | | +3.1 |
| Conservative hold | | Swing | +10.4 | |

General election 2015: Thornbury and Yate
| Party | Candidate | Votes | % | ±% |
|---|---|---|---|---|
| Conservative | Luke Hall | 19,924 | 41.0 | +3.9 |
| Liberal Democrats | Steve Webb | 18,429 | 37.9 | −14.0 |
| UKIP | Russ Martin | 5,126 | 10.6 | +7.1 |
| Labour | Hadleigh Roberts | 3,775 | 7.8 | +0.8 |
| Green | Iain Hamilton | 1,316 | 2.7 | New |
| Majority | | 1,495 | 3.1 | N/A |
| Turnout | | 48,570 | 73.7 | −1.5 |
| Registered electors | | 65,884 | | +2.8 |
| Conservative gain from Liberal Democrats | | Swing | +8.92 | |

General election 2010: Thornbury and Yate
| Party | Candidate | Votes | % | ±% |
|---|---|---|---|---|
| Liberal Democrats | Steve Webb | 25,032 | 51.9 | −2.4 |
| Conservative | Matthew Riddle | 17,916 | 37.2 | +6.3 |
| Labour | Roxanne Egan | 3,385 | 7.0 | −3.9 |
| UKIP | Jenny Knight | 1,709 | 3.5 | |
| Independents Federation UK | Thomas Beacham | 126 | 0.3 | |
| Independent | Anthony Clements | 58 | 0.1 | |
| Majority | | 7,116 | 14.7 | |
| Turnout | | 48,226 | 72.2 | |
| Registered electors | | 64,092 | | +0.1 |
| Liberal Democrats win (new seat) | | | | |

== See also ==
- List of parliamentary constituencies in Avon
- List of parliamentary constituencies in Gloucestershire
