= Frederick Corfield =

British politician (1915–2005)

The Rt Hon Sir Frederick Corfield

Sir Frederick Vernon Corfield PC QC (1 June 1915 – 25 August 2005) was a British Conservative politician and minister.

== Early life ==
Corfield was the son of Brigadier Frederick Alleyne Corfield of the British Indian Army and Mary Graham Vernon. His father also owned the Chatwall estate at Cardington, Shropshire, which Frederick inherited on his father's death in 1939.

He was educated firstly at Brockhurst Preparatory School at Church Stretton and then at Cheltenham College and the Royal Military Academy, Woolwich. He was commissioned into the Royal Artillery in 1935. He was then posted to India until 1939, only to be sent to France with the British Expeditionary Force after the outbreak of World War II. By 1940 he was serving in the 51st (Highland) Division, and mentioned in dispatches, but, as the Germans advanced, the division was cut off and forced to surrender. Thus Corfield spent the remainder of the war as a prisoner of war, latterly at Oflag IX A/Z at Rotenburg an der Fulda. During his time as a prisoner he studied law, and passed examinations qualifying as a barrister.

After his return to England he was called to the bar at Middle Temple in 1946 and spent a year in the army's Judge Advocate General's branch within England. This did not suit him. He spent the next decade mainly as a farmer; first on the family farm at Chatwall, whose main estate he sold in 1951 (keeping some land whose rents he donated to Cardington church, whose advowson he also retained) then on a 300-acre (1.2 km^{2}) farm at Middle Lypiatt near Stroud in Gloucestershire.

== Political career ==
In 1955 he became MP for South Gloucestershire. Shortly after becoming an MP he launched a private member's bill to improve compensation for compulsory land purchases. He received a second reading for his bill in February 1958, against government advice, and its general principles were incorporated in the Town and Country Planning Act of 1959.

He became secretary of the Conservative MPs' agriculture committee (1956–62), and chairman of its small farms subcommittee (1957–58). He also became parliamentary private secretary to Airey Neave. Under Harold Macmillan and Alec Douglas-Home he held the position of Joint Parliamentary Secretary of Housing and Local Government (1962–4). He became an opposition spokesman on land and natural resources 1964–65 and subsequently an executive member of the 1922 Committee.

In 1970 Corfield was briefly Minister of State at the newly formed Department of Trade and Industry under John Davies. He subsequently held the positions of Minister for Aviation Supply and Aerospace Minister (1970–2) where he was responsible for the cancellation of the Black Arrow rocketry programme but provided financial assistance to Rolls-Royce (whose Filton, Bristol factory was within his constituency) when it ran into difficulties that hampered its defence commitments. This help included the nationalisation of the strategically significant aero-engine part of RR. He also presided over the first full scale roll-out of Concorde.

He returned to the backbenches in 1972 and did not contest his Gloucestershire seat in the general election of February 1974, having decided to stand down because of his disagreement with the government's then economic policies and the leadership of Edward Heath and a conviction - proved correct - that his party would lose the election.

== Later career ==
After this retirement from the Commons, Corfield, who had become a member of the Queen's Counsel in 1972, returned to legal pursuits, becoming a Bencher of the Middle Temple and sat as Recorder of a County Court from 1979 to 1987. He joined the committee of the British Waterways Board in 1974 and was its Vice-Chairman from 1980 to 1983. He took seats on the boards of various water companies, although in 1987 he opposed the universal privatisation of the nationalised water utilities that was introduced by the government of Margaret Thatcher.

== Publications ==
Corfield was author of the following legal works:

- Corfield on Compensation (1959)
- A Guide to the Community Land Act, 1976 (1976)
- Compulsory Acquisitional Compensation (with R.J.A. Chinworth) (1978)

== Personal life ==
On 10 August 1945 he married Elizabeth Mary Ruth Taylor, at Holy Trinity Church, Brompton in London. His mother wanted the wedding performed by her own cousin, the Dean of Canterbury, then Hewlett Johnson, but because of the couple's opposition to Johnson's pro-Communist politics, it was instead carried out by one of his father's relations, former Bishop Bernard Corfield.

He died in August 2005.

Parliament of the United Kingdom
Preceded by Anthony Crosland	Member of Parliament for South Gloucestershire; 1955 – Feb 1974	Succeeded by John Cope
