= Austin Mitchell =

British academic, Labour politician, and journalist (1934–2021)

Austin Mitchell ONZM
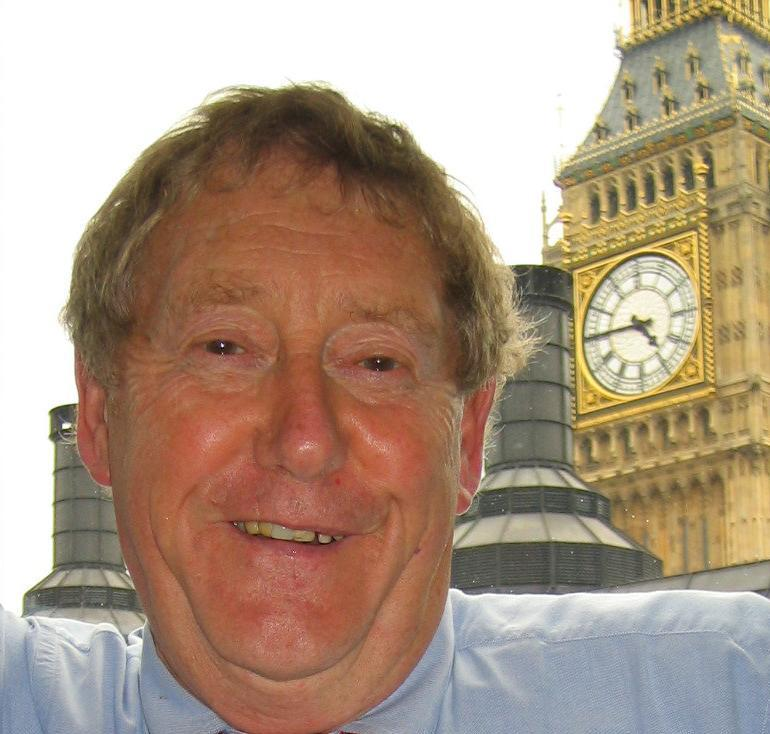
- Mitchell in 2008

Opposition Whip
- In office July 1979 – July 1985
- Leader: James Callaghan; Michael Foot; Neil Kinnock

Shadow Spokesperson For Trade and Industry
- In office July 1988 – July 1989
- Leader: Neil Kinnock

Member of Parliament for Great Grimsby
- In office 28 April 1977 – 30 March 2015
- Preceded by: Anthony Crosland
- Succeeded by: Melanie Onn

Personal details
- Born: Austin Vernon Mitchell; 19 September 1934 Bradford, England
- Died: 18 August 2021 (aged 86) Leeds, England
- Party: Labour; New Zealand Labour
- Spouses: Dorothea Jackson (m. 1959; div. 1966) Linda McDougall (m. 1976)
- Children: 4
- Education: University of Manchester (BA); Nuffield College, Oxford (DPhil)

Austin Vernon Mitchell ONZM (19 September 1934 – 18 August 2021) was a British academic, journalist and Labour Party politician who was the member of Parliament (MP) for Great Grimsby from a 1977 by-election to 2015. He was also the chair of the Labour Euro-Safeguards Campaign. Before becoming an MP in the United Kingdom, Austin Mitchell was a well known television broadcaster in New Zealand.

== Early life and education ==
Born in Bradford, Mitchell was the elder son of Richard Vernon Mitchell and Ethel Mary Butterworth. He was educated at Woodbottom Council School in Baildon, Bingley Grammar School, the University of Manchester, and Nuffield College, Oxford. His doctoral thesis, The Whigs in Opposition, 1815–1830, was published in 1963.

== Career ==
=== Teaching ===
From 1959 to 1963, he lectured in history at the University of Otago in Dunedin. While lecturing in politics from 1963 to 1967 at the University of Canterbury, Mitchell wrote a popular book about New Zealand, The Half Gallon Quarter Acre Pavlova Paradise (1972). The book title became a phrase in the New Zealand English lexicon. In the 1960s and 70s New Zealand remained a milder version of the socialist laboratory it had been since 1935. In the 1980s and 90s the same socialist Labour party's government transformed it into an open market economy. These drastic changes provided ample subject matter for social analysis and 30 years later Mitchell wrote Pavlova Paradise Revisited (2002) as well as a video series accessible on NZ on Screen, after another New Zealand expedition. From 1967 to 1969 Mitchell was an Official Fellow at Nuffield College.

Mitchell joined the New Zealand Labour Party in 1961 and several months later he became chairman of the Dunedin Central branch. In 1963 Phil Connolly, the retiring MP for Dunedin Central, shoulder-tapped Mitchell to put his name forward to replace him in the seat. During their conversation Connolly was particularly concerned with what religion Mitchell was (assuming him to be a Catholic) and was relieved when Mitchell said he was an Anglican, which would be acceptable to a predominantly Presbyterian constituency. However, Mitchell ultimately did not put himself forward for the nomination, instead resolving to return to the UK.

Mitchell was a founding member of New Zealand's University of Canterbury Political Science Department in 1963, supporting it breaking away from the History Department. In 2015 he returned to the University of Canterbury as a Canterbury Visiting Fellow. Mitchell lectured on "Britain and New Zealand - The Great Unravelling", looking at the evolution of recent British politics, drawing analogies in each section with parallel developments and implications for New Zealand to examine all worldwide trends in the evolution of liberal English-speaking democracies.

=== Journalism ===
He first became involved in television journalism while teaching history and politics in New Zealand in the 1960s. He fronted the current affairs show Compass and in 1965 conducted an interview series with leading politicians Men on the Hill in which he explored the balance of power among the institutions of modern government such as caucus, departments, cabinet, and parliament with an emphasis on the question of who governs?. In 1966 he hosted a fortnightly television series Topic exploring an issue of the day and also fronted one-off television programmes – for example The New Zealand woman – who is she. On returning to the UK he used his New Zealand television experience to become a journalist at ITV company Yorkshire Television from 1969 to 1977, presenting their regional news programme Calendar, although he spent a short period at the BBC in 1972, including presentation, on the 24 Hours current affairs show, of a report about the fishing industry at Grimsby. During his period at Yorkshire, Mitchell chaired a tense live studio discussion involving Brian Clough and Don Revie, immediately following Clough's sacking by Leeds United in 1974.

=== Politics ===
He was elected to the UK Parliament at a by-election in 1977, following the death of the previous MP, the Foreign Secretary Tony Crosland. At the time Mitchell identified himself as a Gaitskellite.

Mitchell supported the introduction of television cameras to the House of Commons, raising it for discussion in 1983. The move opened the proceedings of the House to the wider public, who previously had only been able to follow via newspapers and, from 1978, radio. In 1986, following the John Stalker inquiry to alleged Royal Ulster Constabulary "shoot-to-kill" policies in Northern Ireland, a policeman Chief Inspector Brian Woollard claimed he had been removed from the inquiry by a group of Freemasons; Mitchell backed Woollard and argued that there should be a national register of all people in authority who are Freemasons.

In 1980, Mitchell brought in a Bill that would have televised parliamentary proceedings. The vote to allow the Bill to be entered into the House which resulted in a tie vote. Then Deputy Speaker Bernard Weatherill broke to tie to allow the Bill to be debated in line with the Speaker Denison's rule.

Mitchell was appointed to the Labour frontbench by Neil Kinnock in 1988, but was sacked a year later for agreeing to co-host a discussion programme with Norman Tebbit on Rupert Murdoch's fledgling Sky TV. Mitchell described Murdoch as "a figure of hate" for the Labour leadership.

Beginning in the 1990s, Mitchell helped to highlight Jersey's role in facilitating tax evasion, drug trafficking, and money laundering, as well as the island's secretive partnership with accountancy firms Price Waterhouse and Ernst & Young to enact LLP legislation to minimise accountants' liabilities. In the 1997-2001 parliament, Mitchell was a member of the Agriculture Select Committee.

In the 2001 Queen's Birthday Honours, Mitchell was appointed an Officer of the New Zealand Order of Merit, for services to New Zealand interests in the United Kingdom.

In October 2002, he temporarily changed his name to Austin Haddock as haddock is a staple catch for his constituents that was suffering a decline and it was his wish to promote it.

He was chair of the Parliamentary All-Party Photography Group and he regularly exhibited in the APPG's annual photography exhibition. He campaigned for the recognition of photographers' rights after an over-zealous police officer deleted photographs, without his permission, from his camera's memory card at the 2005 Labour Conference in Brighton.

In 2007, Mitchell wrote a front-page article for The Independent newspaper in which he criticised the treatment of a family of asylum-seekers in his constituency. This article quoted him as saying that certain correspondents on the subject to the website of the local newspaper, the Grimsby Telegraph, were "lumpen lunatics." The Grimsby Telegraph covered the response in which it stood by the MP but also reported that a number of readers had called for his resignation.

Although an earlier member of the party's centre-right Labour Solidarity Campaign, he later became a member of the left-wing Socialist Campaign Group – although this later affiliation did not prevent him from nominating Gordon Brown (rather than John McDonnell) for the 2007 Labour Party leadership election. As a supporter of the Better Off Out campaign, Mitchell was a Eurosceptic and he opposed the Common Fisheries Policy. He supported Leave in the 2016 referendum on EU membership, and he commented that 'the EU is a racket run at Britain's expense, a system bonding national elites together to ignore the people'.

Mitchell was also a keen supporter of the Additional Member System, (the electoral system used in elections to the Scottish Parliament and Welsh Assembly), and called a Private Members' Debate on this issue on 1 December 2009.

As part of an independent audit conducted after the United Kingdom Parliamentary expenses scandal of 2009, in which expense claims between 2004 and 2008 for second homes were examined, Mitchell was discovered to have wrongly claimed £10,549 for mortgage repayments. He explained that this was as a result of an oversight in 2006; in January 2010, he issued an apology and repaid the funds.

During 2010, Mitchell participated in Tower Block of Commons, a Channel 4 documentary where MPs live in tower blocks and in with ordinary residents in deprived areas. Mitchell, who insisted on living in his own flat with his wife instead of living with the local residents, was criticised for his apparent lack of engagement in comparison to his Liberal Democrat and Conservative counterparts. He claimed the production company misled him. Mitchell was the President of the Debating Group.

On 29 October 2012, Mitchell directed a tweet at former Conservative MP Louise Mensch, saying "A good wife doesn't disagree with her master in public and a good little girl doesn't lie about why she quit politics." He also referred to Mensch as "Menschkin." The comments were widely condemned as being sexist, with Mensch demanding an apology from both Mitchell and Ed Miliband. Mitchell responded that he was being "ironic".

In April 2014, Mitchell announced that he would not be standing in the next general election, which was held in May 2015.

Upon his retirement he was made High Steward of North East Lincolnshire in September 2015. He was proposed by prominent Croft Baker Councillor Matthew Jason Brown. He held the role until his death.

== Personal life ==
Austin married Dorothea Patricia Jackson in 1959: they had two daughters, Susan Ngaio and Nicola Rewa, but divorced in 1966. In 1976, he married New Zealand television producer and writer Linda McDougall: they had one son, Jonathan Vernon Mitchell, and one daughter, Hannah Kezia Mitchell. Amongst his personal interests were photography and he was a member of the Royal Photographic Society.

In July 2013, Mitchell underwent heart surgery at King's College Hospital, London, to repair a leaking valve. He died at the coronary care unit at Leeds General Infirmary on 18 August 2021, a month before his 87th birthday. Speaking after his death, former Labour leader Tony Blair said, "Austin was a larger than life figure – immense fun, a jovial manner often concealing an acute mind, a challenging colleague at times for sure but always warm-hearted and decent, and above all totally committed to Grimsby! I never had a conversation with him without coming away with a new insight or perspective which is why even when disagreeing, I had to listen."

== In popular culture ==
Mitchell was portrayed in the 2009 film The Damned United, in a scene recreating his interview with Brian Clough and Don Revie. He was played by Mark Bazeley.

== Bibliography ==
- The Half-gallon Quarter-acre Pavlova Paradise, 1972, Whitcombe and Tombs
- Westminster Man, 1982, Methuen, ISBN 0-423-00380-1
- Four years in the death of the Labour Party, 1983, Methuen
- Election '45, 1995, Fabian Society
- Pavlova Paradise Revisited: a guide to the strange but endearing land where Kiwis live, 2002, Penguin Books
- Revenge of the Rich: The Neoliberal Revolution in Britain and New Zealand, 2017, Biteback Publishing, ISBN 978-1-78590-281-9 also Canterbury University Press
- Confessions of a Political Maverick, 2018, Biteback Publishing

== General references ==
- Jamieson, Rosemary (2009). In Command: Minesweeper Captain and Labour Parliamentarian (1st ed.). Wellington, N.Z.: Steele Roberts.

Parliament of the United Kingdom
| Preceded by Anthony Crosland | Member of Parliament for Great Grimsby; 1977–2015 | Succeeded by Melanie Onn |
Party political offices
| Preceded by Andrew McIntosh | Chair of the Fabian Society; 1986–1987 | Succeeded by Nick Butler |
