= Anthony Crosland =

British politician (1918–1977)

The Right Honourable Anthony Crosland
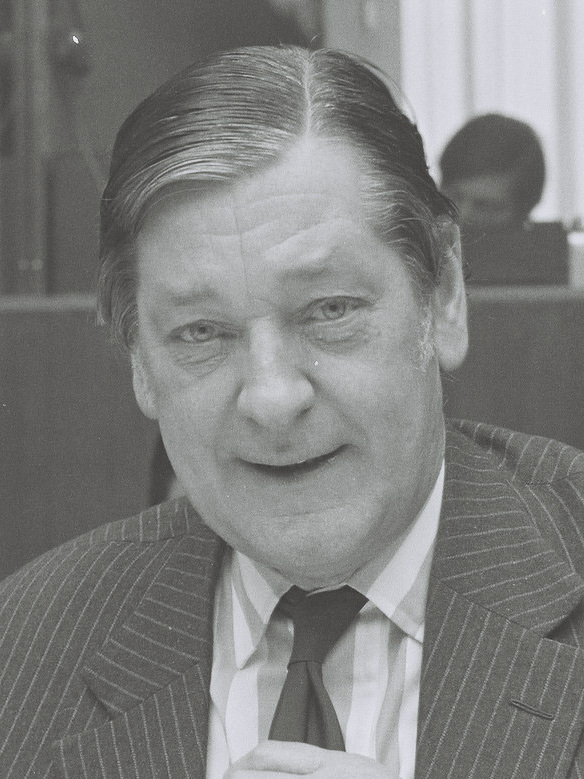
- Crosland in 1977

Secretary of State for Foreign and Commonwealth Affairs
- In office 8 April 1976 – 19 February 1977
- Prime Minister: James Callaghan
- Preceded by: James Callaghan
- Succeeded by: David Owen

Secretary of State for the Environment
- In office 5 March 1974 – 8 April 1976
- Prime Minister: Harold Wilson
- Preceded by: Geoffrey Rippon
- Succeeded by: Peter Shore

Shadow Secretary of State for the Environment
- In office 15 October 1970 – 5 March 1974
- Leader: Harold Wilson
- Preceded by: Himself as Shadow Minister for Regional Planning, Housing & Local Government and the Environment
- Succeeded by: Geoffrey Rippon

Shadow Minister of Public Buildings and Works
- In office 22 July 1970 – 15 October 1970
- Leader: Harold Wilson
- Preceded by: John Silkin
- Succeeded by: Himself as Shadow Secretary of State for the Environment

Shadow Minister of Housing and Local Government
- In office 19 June 1970 – 15 October 1970
- Leader: Harold Wilson
- Preceded by: Peter Walker
- Succeeded by: Himself as Shadow Secretary of State for the Environment

Secretary of State for Local Government and Regional Planning
- In office 6 October 1969 – 19 June 1970
- Prime Minister: Harold Wilson
- Preceded by: Tony Greenwood (Minister, Housing and Local Government)
- Succeeded by: Peter Walker (Minister of State, Housing and Local Government)

President of the Board of Trade
- In office 29 August 1967 – 6 October 1969
- Prime Minister: Harold Wilson
- Preceded by: Douglas Jay
- Succeeded by: Roy Mason

Secretary of State for Education and Science
- In office 22 January 1965 – 29 August 1967
- Prime Minister: Harold Wilson
- Preceded by: Michael Stewart
- Succeeded by: Patrick Gordon Walker

Minister of State for Economic Affairs
- In office 20 October 1964 – 22 January 1965
- Prime Minister: Harold Wilson
- Preceded by: Office established
- Succeeded by: Austen Albu

Economic Secretary to the Treasury
- In office 19 October 1964 – 22 December 1964
- Prime Minister: Harold Wilson
- Preceded by: Maurice Macmillan
- Succeeded by: Jock Bruce-Gardyne (1981)

Member of Parliament for Great Grimsby
- In office 8 October 1959 – 19 February 1977
- Preceded by: Kenneth Younger
- Succeeded by: Austin Mitchell

Member of Parliament for South Gloucestershire
- In office 23 February 1950 – 6 May 1955
- Preceded by: Constituency established
- Succeeded by: Frederick Corfield

Personal details
- Born: Charles Anthony Raven Crosland; 29 August 1918 St Leonards-on-Sea, Sussex, England
- Died: 19 February 1977 (aged 58) Oxford, England
- Party: Labour
- Spouses: Hilary Anne Sarson (m. 1952; div. 1957) Susan Catling (m. 1964)
- Parent: Jessie Raven Crosland (mother)
- Education: Highgate School; Trinity College, Oxford

Charles Anthony Raven Crosland (29 August 1918 – 19 February 1977) was a British Labour Party politician and author. A social democrat on the right wing of the Labour Party, he was a prominent socialist intellectual. His influential book The Future of Socialism (1956) argued against many Marxist notions and the traditional Labour Party doctrine that expanding public ownership was essential to make socialism work, arguing instead for prioritising the end of poverty and improving public services. He offered positive alternatives to both the right wing and left wing of the Labour Party.

Having served as Member of Parliament (MP) for South Gloucestershire from 1950 to 1955, Crosland returned to Parliament for Great Grimsby (1959–1977). During Harold Wilson's governments of 1964–1970 he served as Economic Secretary to the Treasury (1964), then Minister of State for Economic Affairs (1964–1965). Entering the Cabinet as Secretary of State for Education and Science (1965–1967), he led the Labour campaign to replace grammar schools with comprehensive schools that did not use the eleven-plus for the selection of pupils. He later served as President of the Board of Trade (1967–1969), then Secretary of State for Local Government and Regional Planning (1969–1970).

When Labour returned to power he served as Secretary of State for the Environment (1974–1976) and briefly as Foreign Secretary (1976–1977). In that role he promoted détente with the Soviet Union. He died suddenly in February 1977 of a cerebral haemorrhage, aged 58.

== Early life ==
Crosland was born at St Leonards-on-Sea in East Sussex. His father, Joseph Beardsall Crosland, was a senior official at the War Office, and his mother, Jessie Raven, was an academic. Both of his parents were members of the Plymouth Brethren. His maternal grandfather was Frederick Edward Raven (1837–1903), founder of the Raven Exclusive Brethren and secretary of the Royal Naval College, Greenwich. Crosland later rejected his family's religion. He grew up in north London and was educated at Highgate School and at Trinity College, Oxford, obtaining a second class honours degree in Classical Moderations in Greek and Latin Literature.

In the spring of 1941, Crosland was commissioned in the Royal Welch Fusiliers, and in late 1942 he joined (as part of the 6th (Royal Welch) Parachute Battalion) the 2nd Parachute Brigade, which was part of the 1st Airborne Division. In September 1943, he participated in the landings at Taranto, Operation Slapstick. Crosland had his first direct experience of combat in Italy in December . He then became an intelligence officer gathering information for several months in the front line about troop movements at the Battle of Monte Cassino, and was also briefly involved in the Allied invasion of southern France as part of Operation Rugby in August 1944. He ended the war as a Captain.

After the war, Crosland returned to Oxford University and obtained first class honours in Philosophy, Politics and Economics, which he studied in 12 months; he also became President of the Oxford Union. He then became a university don at Oxford, tutoring in Economics. Notable people he taught at Oxford included Tony Benn, Norris McWhirter and Ross McWhirter.

== In opposition ==
=== Early years in parliament ===
Crosland, who had been talent-spotted by Hugh Dalton, was chosen as a Labour candidate in December 1949 to fight the next general election. He entered Parliament at the February 1950 general election, being returned for the South Gloucestershire constituency. He held that seat until the 1955 general election, when he was defeated at Southampton Test.

Crosland returned to the House of Commons at the 1959 general election when he was elected for Grimsby, which he would represent for the rest of his life. He was, like Roy Jenkins and Denis Healey, a friend and protégé of Hugh Gaitskell, and together they were regarded as the "modernisers" of their day.

From June 1960, Crosland played an important part in the establishment of the Campaign for Democratic Socialism, a right-wing grassroots group within the Labour Party, created, in part, as a response to the debates around the Left's advocacy of unilateral nuclear disarmament and Clause IV. However, Crosland was against Gaitskell's attempts to change Clause 4.

=== 1963 leadership election ===
Even though they were from the same wing of the party, the thought of the Labour Party being led by the volatile George Brown appalled Crosland, but he also was a critic of Harold Wilson for his apparent lack of principles. Just over two years earlier Wilson had challenged Gaitskell for the party leadership. Crosland nominated and voted for James Callaghan in the leadership contest caused by Gaitskell's death on 18 January 1963. He rationalised his decision to back Callaghan on the basis that "We have to choose between a crook [Harold Wilson] and a drunk [George Brown]". However, Callaghan was eliminated after obtaining 41 votes, the margin in votes between Wilson and Brown in the final ballot. With Callaghan eliminated, Crosland's second wife wrote in her 1982 biography, he voted for George Brown in the second ballot, although with zero enthusiasm, and with little interest about the result, as he was opposed to both of the candidates now standing for the party leadership. Wilson won by 144 votes to Brown's 103 on 14 February 1963.

Although critical of Harold Wilson, and angry with him for his 1960 challenge to Gaitskell for the party leadership, Crosland respected him as a political operator. Under Wilson, Crosland was first appointed Brown's deputy in October 1964. In November 1964 Crosland and Brown told Wilson and Callaghan that ruling out devaluation was a mistake in the face of the economic crisis then under way. However, Crosland was not Brown's deputy for long.

== In government ==
On 22 January 1965, Wilson appointed Crosland Secretary of State for Education and Science.

=== Grammar schools controversy ===
The ongoing campaign for Comprehensive schools in England and Wales gained a major boost with Circular 10/65, which as a statute rather than a Government Bill was controversial at the time, although a government motion in favour of the policy had been passed in January 1965. Crosland's policy gained approval from local government; by 1979 over 90% of pupils were in comprehensive schools. In her biography published in 1982, Susan Crosland said her husband had told her "If it's the last thing I do, I'm going to destroy every fucking grammar school in England. And Wales and Northern Ireland."

Another major educational change was that presaged by his speech at Woolwich Polytechnic (now Greenwich University) establishing a 'binary system' of higher education, in which universities would be joined by polytechnic institutions which concentrated on high-level vocational skills.

=== Overseas student fees hike ===
In October 1966, a committee of ministers in the Labour government decided to increase university fees for overseas students. Two months later Crosland announced their decision which treated Commonwealth students for the first time as if they were foreign. Widespread protests, which erupted immediately, soon united a large number of influential people from across a wide spectrum from left-wing militant students to mildly conservative vice-chancellors.

=== 1967–1976 ===
Crosland subsequently served as President of the Board of Trade from September 1967 to October 1969. He was deeply disappointed not to have been made Chancellor of the Exchequer after the November 1967 cabinet reshuffle which followed the devaluation of the pound. Roy Jenkins was appointed as Chancellor instead. Crosland then became Secretary of State for Local Government and Regional Planning until the election defeat of June 1970.

Crosland was seen as a leader and intellectual guru of the "right wing" or "social democratic" wing of the Labour Party in the 1970s. In April 1972, he stood for the deputy leadership of the party after Roy Jenkins resigned. He polled 61 votes of the Parliamentary Labour Party and was eliminated in the first round. The contest was eventually won by Edward Short, who defeated Michael Foot. Crosland was embarrassed by the national press in January 1973 when it emerged he had been given a silver coffee pot donated by disgraced corrupt architect John Poulson when opening a school in Bradford in January 1966. It later transpired that the pot was only silver-plated, and therefore of trivial value.

After Labour's return to power in March 1974, Crosland became Secretary of State for the Environment. He was instrumental in changing Transport policy on British Rail to be a higher fare fast intercity passenger service rather than its previous role as a general freight common carrier. He contested the leadership in March 1976 following Wilson's resignation, but polled only 17 votes and finished bottom of the poll. After his elimination, he switched his support to the eventual winner James Callaghan, who duly rewarded Crosland by appointing him Foreign Secretary on 8 April 1976.

According to John P. Mackintosh, the Wilson and Callaghan governments were dominated by Crosland's views on equality:

Crosland’s ideas continued to be almost unchallenged and dominated the Labour governments of 1964–1970. [...] [T]he Labour Government which came into office in 1974 edged back towards a Croslandite position. [...] [I]f any ideas or policies could be said to have characterised Mr Callaghan's very matter-of-fact and cautious government, they were the continuation of an approach which Crosland had set out in 1956.

Crosland's time as foreign secretary was dominated by the Third Cod War and relations with Rhodesia. Crosland once quipped to his wife that "when I pop off and they cut open my heart, on it will be engraved 'fish' and 'Rhodesia'".

== Personal life ==
Early in his life Crosland had numerous gay affairs, including allegedly with Roy Jenkins. He later described the relationship as "an exceedingly close and intense friendship."

Crosland benefited from the patronage of Hugh Dalton, who, in 1951, wrote to Richard Crossman: "Thinking of Tony, with all his youth and beauty and gaiety and charm... I weep. I am more fond of that young man than I can put into words." According to Nicholas Davenport, Dalton's unrequited feelings for Crosland became an embarrassing joke within the Labour Party.

Crosland married Hilary Sarson in November 1952, divorcing after five years, though the marriage had effectively ended after a year. Crosland had numerous affairs with other women. He remarried on 7 February 1964 to Susan Catling, an American from Baltimore resident in London whom he had met in 1956, and, in contrast to his first marriage, this was very happy and contented. Susan Crosland was a successful journalist and writer. There were no children of either marriage, although Crosland's second wife had two daughters from a previous marriage. He persuaded his step-daughters to abandon their elite private schools to attend Holland Park Comprehensive. Susan Crosland died on 26 February 2011.

Crosland was a keen football fan and an avid viewer of the television show Match of the Day. He insisted on taking the then American Secretary of State Henry Kissinger, a football fan, to Blundell Park to watch Grimsby Town play Gillingham in April 1976 when the two met for the first time. In December 1976, when Kissinger bowed out after the Republican defeat, he watched a football match with Crosland at Stamford Bridge between Chelsea and Wolverhampton Wanderers.

== Labour revisionist ==
After losing his seat in 1955, he wrote (as C.A.R. Crosland) The Future of Socialism which was published in autumn 1956. This became a seminal work for the moderate British left. (A revised 50th anniversary edition was published in 2006.) In the book he outlines the need for socialism to adapt to modern circumstances – a context from which the use of the term "revisionism" has its origins in Britain, despite the gradualism associated with the Fabian Society since the end of the nineteenth century.

Labour revisionism was a powerful ideological tendency within the Party in the 1950s and 1960s, taking intellectual sustenance from the Crosland book, and political leadership from Hugh Gaitskell. The goal was to reformulate socialist principles, and bring the Labour Party policies up to date with the changing British society and economy. Revisionism rejected the view that socialism ought to be primarily identified with the ownership of the means of production. That meant that continuous nationalisation was not a central goal. The focus should rather be on regulating the market, improving workers' pay and conditions, and public investment. Second, was a series of political values focused on personal liberty, social welfare, and equality and "a more joyful society". Themes of destroying or overthrowing the rich and elite were downplayed in favour of policies of high taxation, more widespread educational opportunity, and expanded social services. Revisionists insisted on the necessity of a market-oriented mixed economy with a central role for capitalism and entrepreneurship.

Crosland was himself an active member of the Fabian Society, contributing to the New Fabian Essays collection, which saw the emerging generation of Labour thinkers and politicians attempt to set out a new programme for Labour following the Attlee governments of 1945 to 1951. In the 1951 essay "The Transition from Capitalism" he claimed that "by 1951 Britain had, in all the essentials, ceased to be a capitalist country" as a result of the establishment of the welfare state. In particular, Crosland wished to challenge the dominance of Sidney and Beatrice Webb in Fabian thinking, challenging their austere, managerialist, centralising, "top-down", bureaucratic Fabianism with a more liberal vision of the good society and the good life, writing in The Future of Socialism that "Total abstinence and a good filing system are not now the right signposts to the socialist utopia. Or at least, if they are, some of us will fall by the wayside".

Two further books of essays by Crosland were published: The Conservative Enemy (London, Cape, 1962) and Socialism Now, and Other Essays (London, Cape, 1974).

== Death ==
Crosland and his wife bought a converted mill at Adderbury in Oxfordshire in 1975, as well as having a home at Lansdowne Road in Notting Hill, London. On the afternoon of 13 February 1977, Crosland was at his home in Adderbury, working on a paper on the Rhodesian situation, and was planning that evening to complete a major foreign policy speech on détente. However, he suffered a massive cerebral haemorrhage and fell into a coma. He died six days later, on 19 February, at Radcliffe Infirmary in Oxford, aged 58. Crosland was succeeded as foreign secretary by David Owen, who delivered his speech to the Diplomatic Writers Association on 3 March 1977. The following day, Crosland's ashes were scattered at sea near Grimsby.

His papers are held at the London School of Economics.

== In popular culture ==
=== Theatre ===
The play Gang of Three was originally performed at the King's Head Theatre in London in 2025 and will tour the UK in 2026. The play examines the relationship between Denis Healey, Tony Crosland and Roy Jenkins and was written by Khan and Salinsky.

== See also ==
- Eduard Bernstein
- Roy Hattersley
- Reformism
- Dick Leonard

Parliament of the United Kingdom
New constituency	Member of Parliament for South Gloucestershire; 1950–1955	Succeeded by Frederick Corfield
Preceded by Kenneth Younger	Member of Parliament for Great Grimsby; 1959–1977	Succeeded by Austin Mitchell
Government offices
Preceded by Michael Stewart	Secretary of State for Education and Science; 1965–1967	Succeeded by Patrick Gordon Walker
Preceded by Douglas Jay	President of the Board of Trade; 1967–1969	Succeeded by Roy Mason
Preceded by Anthony Greenwood as Minister of State for Housing and Local Government	Secretary of State for Local Government and Regional Planning; 1969–1970	Succeeded by Peter Walker as Minister for Housing and Local Government
Preceded by Geoffrey Rippon	Secretary of State for the Environment; 1974–1976	Succeeded by Peter Shore
Preceded by James Callaghan	Secretary of State for Foreign and Commonwealth Affairs; 1976–1977	Succeeded by David Owen
Political offices
New office	Shadow Secretary of State for Environment; 1970–1974	Succeeded by Geoffrey Rippon
Party political offices
Preceded by Baron Faringdon	Chairman of the Fabian Society; 1961–1962	Succeeded by Mary Stewart
