= Mildred Coughlin =

American artist

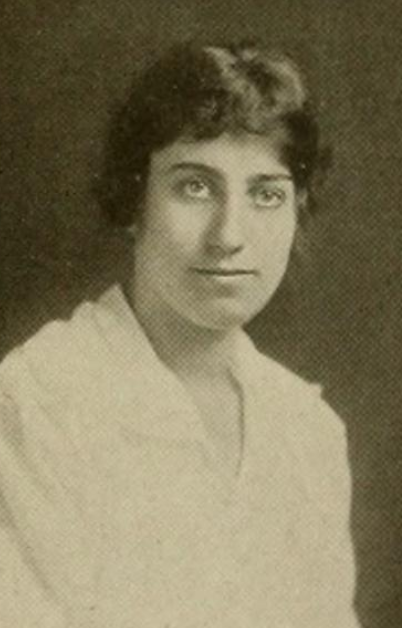
- Mildred Coughlin, from a 1915 yearbook
- Born: Mildred Marion Coughlin; July 16, 1892; Wilkes-Barre, Pennsylvania
- Died: December 3, 1984 (aged 92); Sonoma, California
- Known for: Painting, Printmaking
- Spouse: Patterson McNutt

Mildred Coughlin (1892-1984) was an American artist known for painting, illustration, and printmaking.

== Biography ==
Coughlin was born in Wilkes-Barre, Pennsylvania on July 16, 1892. She studied at Wellesley College, the École des Beaux-Arts, and Art Students League of New York. In 1924 she married the playwright Patterson McNutt. The couple settled in California in the 1930s. Coughlin depicted various aspects of life in Los Angeles, often humorously. Her subjects include Hollywood movie-making, the Santa Anita racetrack, and the Los Angeles Farmers Market.

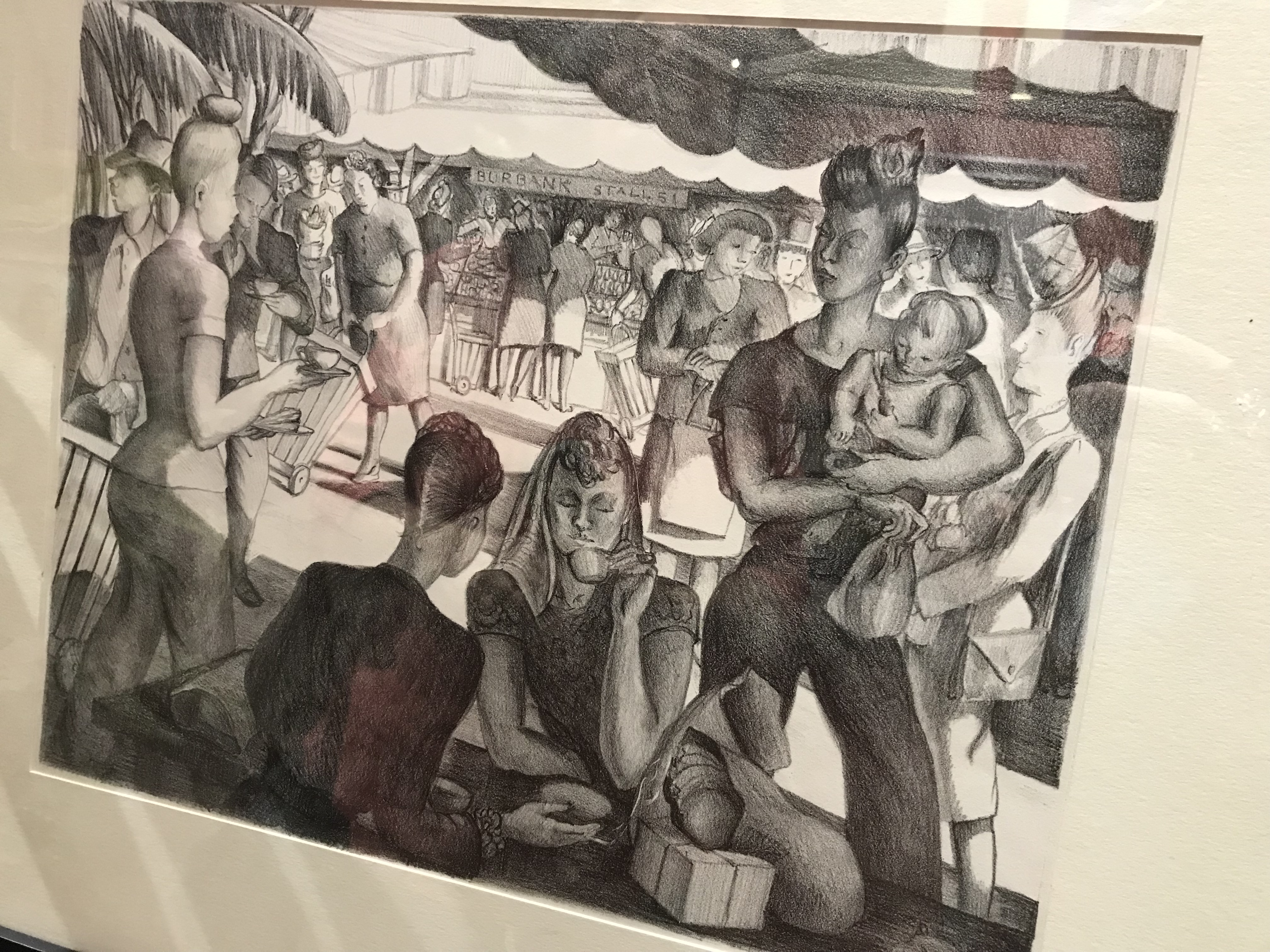
Farmers Market circa 1935 by Mildred Coughlin.

Coughlin exhibited her work at the California Society of Etchers (now the California Society of Printmakers, the Chicago Society of Etchers, the Society of American Etchers, and the Southern Printmakers.

Coughlin died in Sonoma, California on December 3, 1984. Her work is in the Smithsonian American Art Museum, the National Gallery of Art, as well as the Library of Congress, and the Pennsylvania Academy of the Fine Arts.
