= 1977 Great Grimsby by-election =

UK Parliamentary by-election

The 1977 by-election for the Great Grimsby took place on 28 April 1977.

It was caused by the death in February of Anthony Crosland, and was retained for Labour by Austin Mitchell.

It took place on the same day as the Labour defeat in Ashfield. The result in Grimsby and Ashfield were seen as a surprise as they were the opposite of what had been expected. Grimsby had been expected to fall to the Conservatives, while Labour had expected to hold Ashfield, which they had held by a much larger majority. In the event while there was a swing of 20.9% to the Conservatives in Ashfield, which was just enough to win the seat, the Labour to Conservative swing in Grimsby was only 7% and Mitchell managed to poll more votes than Crosland had at the last election. The Liberal Party lost its deposit in both Grimsby and Ashfield, the third time this had happened at a by-election following the 1977 Lib-Lab Pact.

Great Grimsby by-election, 1977
Party	Candidate	Votes	%	±%
Labour	Austin Mitchell	21,890	46.88	−0.22
Conservative	Robert Blair	21,370	45.76	+13.85
Liberal	Andrew de Freitas	3,128	6.7	−13.93
Socialist Workers	Michael Stanton	215	0.5	New
Sunshine Party	Peter Bishop	64	0.1	New
Malcolm Muggeridge Fan Club	Max Nottingham	30	0.0	New
Majority		520	1.12	−14.06
Turnout		46,697		
Labour hold		Swing	-7.04	

At the next election, in 1979, Mitchell increased his majority to 6,241 votes.
