= Henry Ellacombe =

Henry Ellacombe may refer to:

- Henry Thomas Ellacombe (1790–1885), English divine and antiquary
- Henry Nicholson Ellacombe (1822–1916), English plantsman and author on botany and gardening
