= Ellicombe =

Ellicombe is a surname. Notable people with the surname include:

- Charles Grene Ellicombe (1783–1871), English general and royal engineer
- Henry Thomas Ellicombe (1790–1885), English divine and antiquary, brother of Charles

== See also ==
- Ellacombe (disambiguation)
