= Ellacombe (surname) =

Ellacombe is a surname. Notable people with the surname include:

- Henry Thomas Ellacombe (1790–1885), English divine and antiquary
- Henry Nicholson Ellacombe (1822–1916), plantsman and author on botany and gardening

== See also ==
- Ellacombe (disambiguation)
