= William Lawson (priest) =

English clergyman and author on gardening

William Lawson (c.1554–1635) was an English cleric, known as a writer on gardening.

== Life ==
Lawson was a graduate of Christ Church, Oxford, and vicar of Ormesby, North Riding of Yorkshire from 1583.

== Works ==
Lawson wrote a two-part work, A New Orchard and Garden, Or the best way for Planting, Grafting, and to make any pound good for a Rich Orchard; particularly in the North Parts of England, London, 1618, dedicated to Sir Henry Belasyse. The second part was entitled The Countrie Housewifes Garden, bearing the date 1617. He claimed it was the result of 48 years' experience and observation only. Another edition appeared in 1622, with a chapter by Simon Harward, on the "Art of Propagating Plants". It was incorporated with Gervase Markham's A Way to Get Wealth, 1623, 1626, 1638, 1648, etc., to 1683, and was periodically enlarged.

The Secrets of Angling by John Dennys was annotated by Lawson in its second edition of 1620.

== Family ==
Lawson was twice married: firstly to Sibille (died 1618)—they had two children–and secondly in 1619 to Emme Tailer who survived him.
