= Wick, Gloucestershire =

Village in Gloucestershire, England

Coordinates: 51°27′10″N 2°25′25″W

Wick
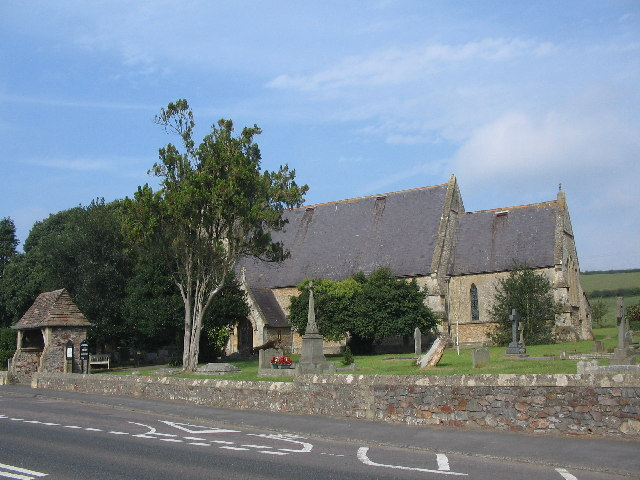
- St Bartholomew's church

- Location within Gloucestershire
- Population: 1,989
- OS grid reference: ST705727
- Civil parish: Wick and Abson
- Unitary authority: South Gloucestershire
- Ceremonial county: Gloucestershire
- Region: South West
- Country: England
- Sovereign state: United Kingdom
- Post town: BRISTOL
- Postcode district: BS30
- Police: Avon and Somerset
- Fire: Avon
- Ambulance: South Western
- UK Parliament: Thornbury and Yate
- Website: wickabsonpcgov.uk/

Wick is a village in South Gloucestershire, England. It is the main settlement in the civil parish of Wick and Abson. The population of this civil parish taken at the 2011 census was 1,989.

== Description ==
It is situated on the A420 between Bristol and Chippenham, south of the Cotswolds. The River Boyd flows through the old village, with its watermeadows facing St. Bartholomew's Church, a grade II* listed building dating from 1850.

As well as the church, the village has several shops, the Rose & Crown and (now defunct) Carpenters Arms public houses, a village hall, sports ground, and Wick Primary School. Brockwell Park provides a green space for the village with a play area and a trim trail, as well as a Community Orchard planted in 2020.

Nearby Blue Lodge was once the home of Black Beauty author Anna Sewell and Tracy Park on the Bath Road (now a golf club) was thought to be the inspiration for Black Beauty's Birtwick Park.

== Golden Valley ==
The picturesque Golden Valley, running north from Wick alongside the River Boyd, is well known for walking, birding and equestrian activity. It was described by the poet John Dennys of Pucklechurch in his work of 1613 The Secrets of Angling, the earliest English poetical treatise on fishing:

And thou sweet Boyd that with thy watry sway
Dost wash the cliffes of Deington and of Weeke
And through their Rockes with crooked winding way
Thy mother Avon runnest soft to seek.

The authorship of the poem was a mystery for many years, having been published anonymously, and it was partly due to his mention of the rocks of Wick that he was finally identified. The Golden Valley is also a favorite destination for hot air balloonists. Adjacent to Golden Valley is the historic Bury Manor.

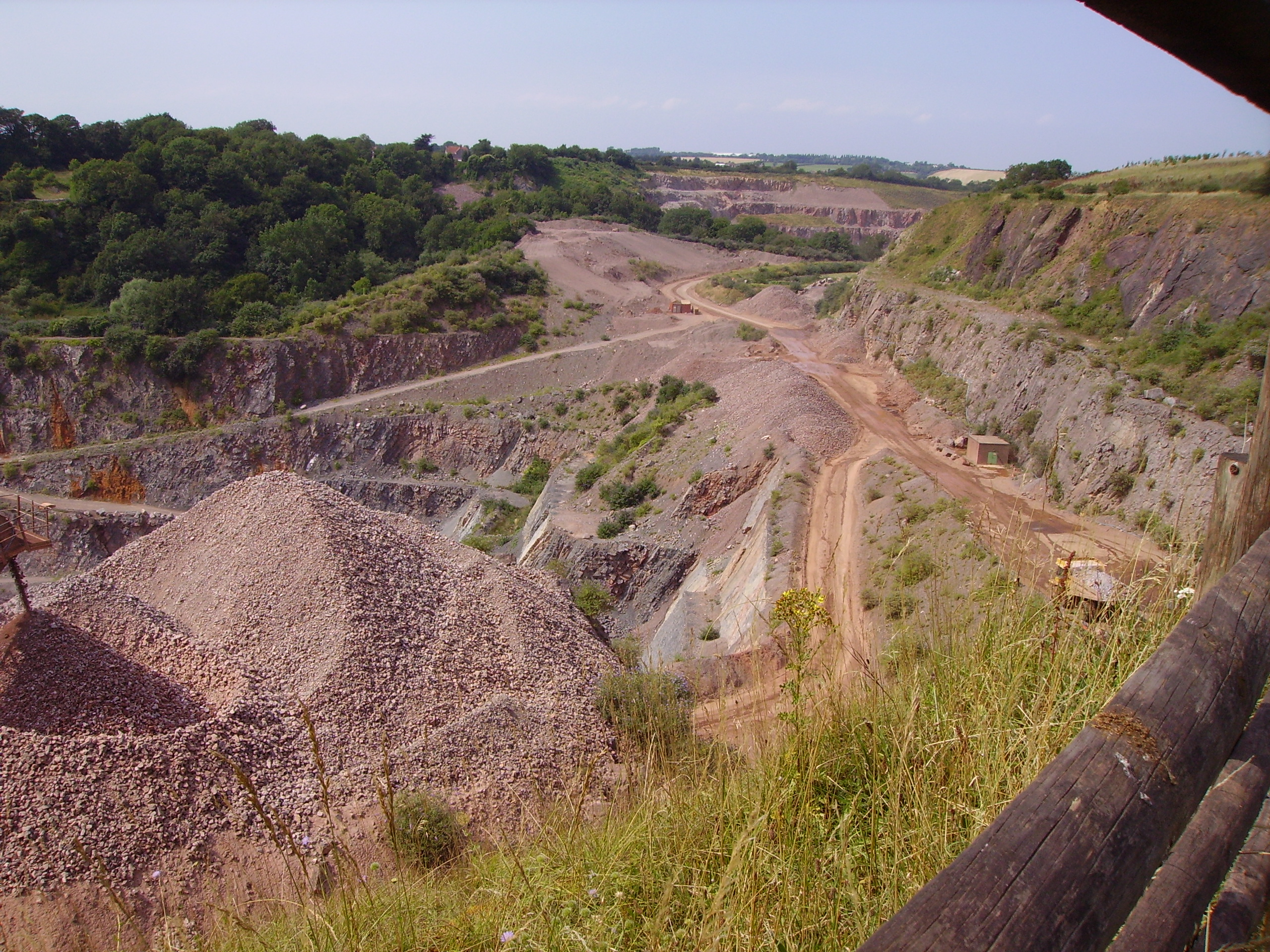
Wick Quarry

Wick Quarry, a limestone quarry previously owned by CEMEX, is no longer operational but is a haven for wildlife and also a birdwatching site. The site was owned by MJ Church. Part of the site is managed by South Gloucestershire Council as the Golden Valley Local Nature Reserve. In February 2026, the two landowners informed the council they no longer wish to be part of the access and management agreement, which means its local nature reserve status may be withdrawn by Natural England.
