= River Boyd =

Boyd
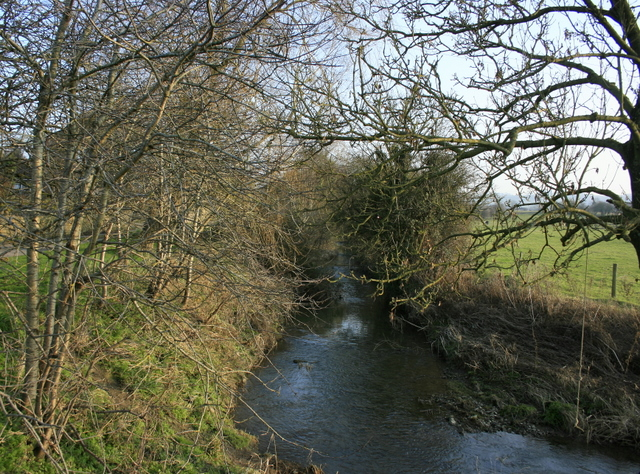
- The River Boyd at Doynton, South Gloucestershire, England

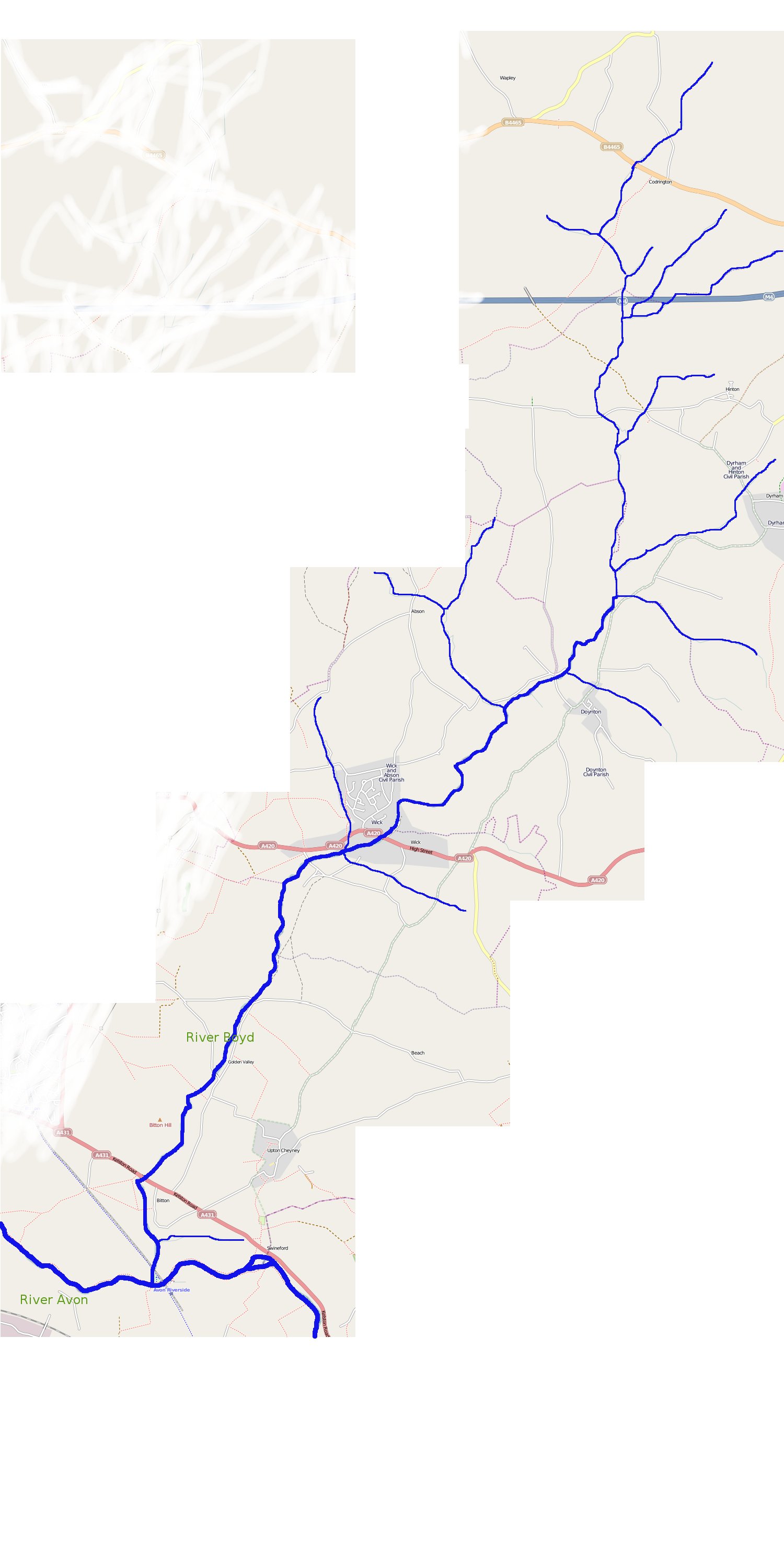
- Diagrammatic map of the River Boyd and tributaries in South Gloucestershire
- Etymology: British Celtic virtue, favour, blessing or benefit

Location
- Country: England
- Region: West Country
- District: South Gloucestershire
- City: Bristol

Physical characteristics
- Source: Springs Farm
  - location: Dodington, South Gloucestershire, England
  - coordinates: 51.5011°N 2.3673°W
  - elevation: 427 ft (130 m)
- Mouth: Bristol Avon
  - location: Bitton, South Gloucestershire, England
  - coordinates: 51.4170°N 2.4608°W
  - elevation: 49 ft (15 m)
- Length: 7 mi (11 km), south
- Discharge
  - average: 19.8 cu ft/s (0.56 m^{3}/s)
  - minimum: 0.35 cu ft/s (0.0099 m^{3}/s)
  - maximum: 979 cu ft/s (27.7 m^{3}/s)

Basin features
- Tributaries
  - right: Feltham Brook
- River system: Bristol Avon

The River Boyd is a river of some 7 miles (11 km) in length which rises near Dodington in South Gloucestershire, England. It is a tributary of the Bristol Avon, running in a southerly direction and joining near Bitton. The flow rate at Bitton is an average 19.8 cubic feet per second (0.56 m^{3}/s). It was immortalised in the 1613 poem by John Dennys of Pucklechurch The Secrets of Angling, the earliest English poetical tract on fishing:

And thou sweet Boyd that with thy watry sway
Dost wash the cliffes of Deington and of Weeke
And through their Rockes with crooked winding way
Thy mother Avon runnest soft to seeke
In whose fayre streames the speckled Trout doth play
The Roche the Dace the Gudgin and the Bleeke
Teach me the skill with slender Line and Hooke
To take each Fish of River Pond and Brooke.

In common with other rivers of the area, watermills were used for various industrial undertakings, most notably the Wick Golden Valley Ochre Works. The former works site is now a local nature reserve and the river and valley form part of a Site of Nature Conservation Interest.

== Course ==
The Boyd rises from springs near Sands Farm, just south of Dodington Chase. Several small tributaries join on the right from springs issuing from a ridge of high land to the north. The river then passes underneath the M4 motorway, being joined by further streams from the direction of Codrington. Just before Doynton tributaries emanating from Dyrham join on the left bank. The Feltham Brook joins on the right bank, from the direction of Pucklechurch, near Doynton House and the river then passes under Cleeve Bridge and enters the steep Golden Valley, where a nature reserve has been established.

Passing under Boyd Bridge in Wick, the river turns in a southerly direction, running parallel to the Monarch's Way long-distance footpath. Emerging from Golden Valley just north of Bitton, the Boyd skirts the village and then meanders across river meadows before joining the Bristol Avon adjacent to the point where the Bristol and Bath Railway Path crosses the Avon.

== History ==
Ochre, a mixture of clay and iron oxide was mined in Golden Valley near Wick and the Wick Golden Valley Ochre Works remained in business from the late nineteenth century until 1970. The spoil coloured the water a bright yellow, hence the name Golden Valley. A reservoir and lake were constructed to supply watermills which crushed the mined material.

Limestone and Millstone Grit were quarried locally and the coal measures that underlay the area were also worked. Water power was used for numerous mills, mostly for grinding corn, although some were for industrial works in the valley, including iron works and a paper mill. The course of the river was straightened and many dams and weirs were placed across it.

== Natural history ==
Wick Golden Valley Local Nature Reserve forms part of a larger Site of Nature Conservation Interest (SNCI) known as "Wick Rocks and the River Boyd". Habitats include calcareous grassland with an alkaline soil type, broadleaved woodland, the river and associated riverbank vegetation. Species of plants include Common Cow-wheat, Bitter Vetch, Black Spleenwort, Harebell, Nettle-leaved Bellflower, Bluebell and Viper's Bugloss. A micro-moth, Pammene trauniana, can be found - also dippers, kingfishers, buzzards, otters, bats and damselflies.

== Etymology ==
The name Boyd is believed to derive from a British Celtic root meaning "virtue, favour, blessing or benefit". It has been suggested that this implies the waters have a healing quality.

== Hydrology ==
The Environment Agency maintains a Gauging Station at Bitton and records an average flow rate of 19.8 cubic feet per second (0.56 m^{3}/s). A peak rate of 978.8 cubic feet per second (27.72 m^{3}/s) was recorded on 30 May 1979 and minimum of 0.35 cubic feet per second (0.0099 m^{3}/s) on 16 August 1976.
