= Bury Manor =

Coordinates: 51°27′17.2″N 2°25′26.9″W

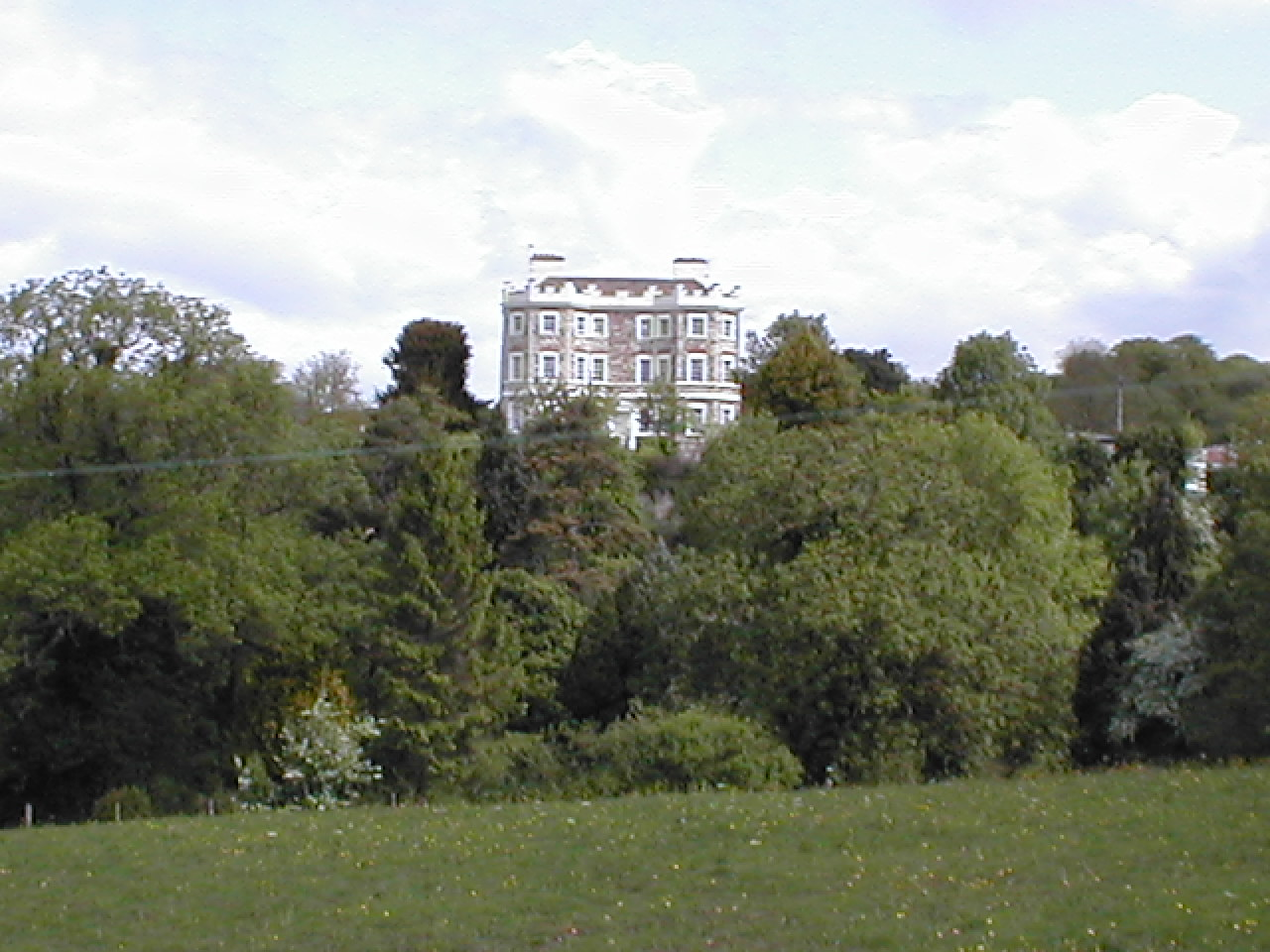
Bury Manor Castle

Bury Manor Castle is an early 19th-century house in the village of Wick, South Gloucestershire, England. It was built in Gothic Revival style.

The three-storey stone building has a slate roof and embattled parapet.

The site was an earlier manor house and the cellars date back to the 13th century. It has had a variety of uses: as a school, offices and health spa. Since 2006 it has been a private residence.
