= Allen Culpepper Sealy =

English painter

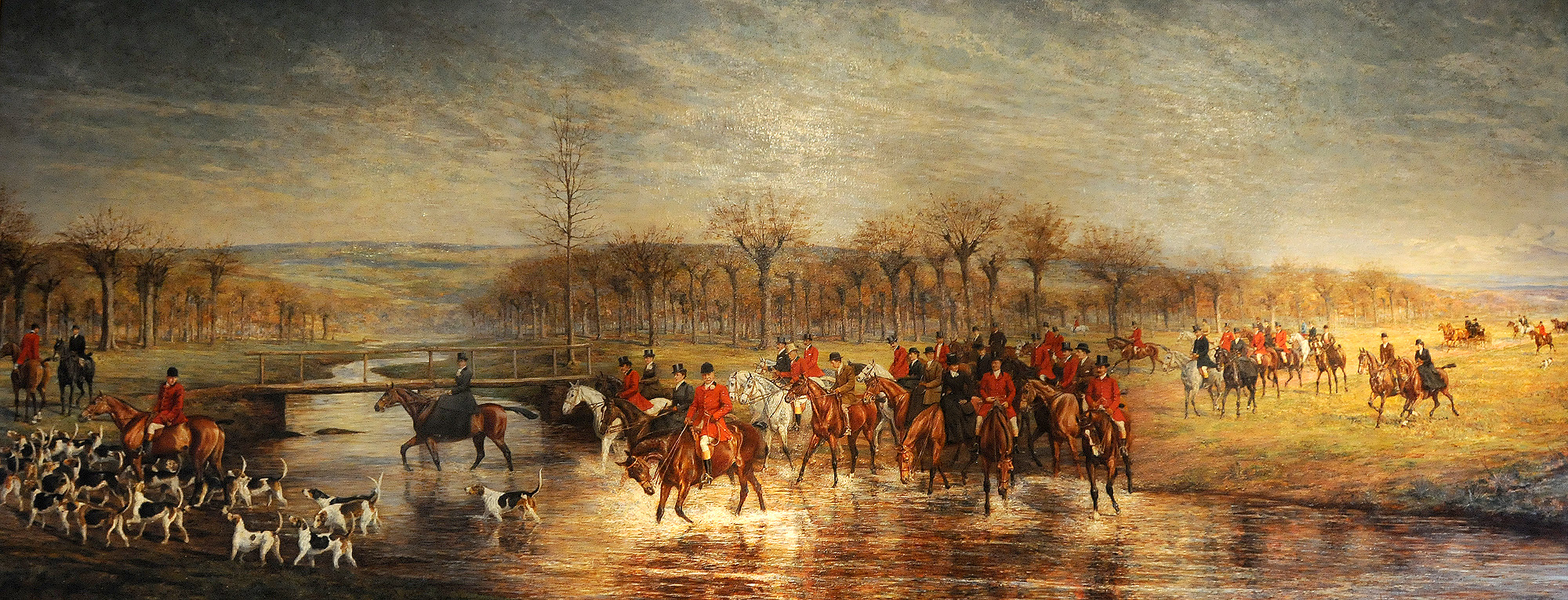
- The Pau Hunt
- Born: 10 September 1850; Bitton, England
- Died: 11 November 1927 (aged 77); Parkstone, England
- Known for: Landscape and equestrian painter, draughtsman

Allen Culpepper Sealy (10 September 1850 – 11 November 1927) was an English painter, best known for his landscapes and equestrian work. A student of the Bristol School of Art, he went on to exhibit at the Royal Academy, the Fine Art Society and the Royal Institute of Oil Painters.

== Early life ==
Sealy was born at Field Grove House in Bitton, Somerset in 1850, to Thomas Sealy, a landowner, and his wife Ann née Humfrey. Allan was educated at a private boarding school in Littleham St Thomas, Devon, and later went on to study at the Bristol School of Art. In 1880, he married Elizabeth Phillipa Pine Harris in Exeter.

== Career ==
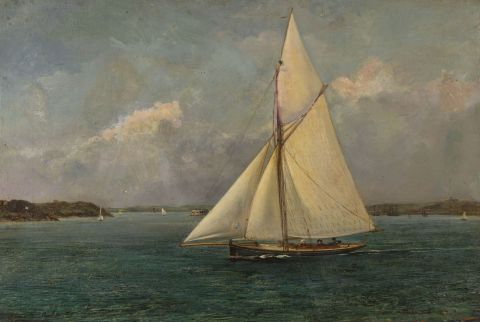
Oil on canvas of a cutter in Milford Haven, Pembrokeshire, 1883

By 1881, Sealy had moved to Marylebone, London with his wife. He began to specialise in both landscapes and equestrian scenes, travelling extensively on commissions. He exhibited at the Royal Academy between 1875 and 1886, in addition to the Birmingham Royal Society of Artists; the Fine Art Society; the Walker Art Gallery; the Manchester City Art Gallery; the Royal Society of British Artists; the Royal Hibernian Academy and the Royal Institute of Oil Painters. He died at Park Cottage, Parkstone, Poole, Dorset on 11 November 1927.

== Notable works ==
- Kingwood, 1887, oil on canvas
- Tally Ho!, 1891, oil on canvas
- Gonsalvo and Groom in Stable, 1891, oil on canvas
- The Pau Hunt, 1907, oil on canvas
