= RAF Pucklechurch =

RAF Pucklechurch
- Near Pucklechurch, Gloucestershire in England

Site information
- Type: Balloon Centre
- Owner: Air Ministry
- Controlled by: Royal Air Force

Location
- Shown within Gloucestershire RAF Pucklechurch (the United Kingdom)
- Coordinates: 51.4811°N 2.4361°W

Site history
- Built: 1939
- In use: 1939-1959

Garrison information
- Garrison: RAF Balloon Command; RAF Maintenance Command

RAF Pucklechurch was a Royal Air Force site in Pucklechurch, Gloucestershire from 9 August 1939 until 31 December 1959. It became known as RAF Pucklechurch on 16 June 1952. It was transferred to HM Prison Service in September 1962 and became Pucklechurch Remand Centre.

== History ==
During the war barrage balloons were an important defence to the industry and transport sites in the Bristol region. There were large hangars and fuel storage facilities. Pucklechurch was under the command of the RAF Filton station commander.

From April 1957 to September 1959 it housed the Joint Services School for Applied Linguistics and the RAF Chinese Language School.

== Operational commands ==
- Opened – 9 August 1939 (as No. 11 Balloon Centre)
- RAF Balloon Command (9 August 1939 – 22 April 1945)
- RAF Maintenance Command (22 April 1945 – 25 February 1947)
- No. 62 Group RAF (25 February 1947 – 14 January 1957)
- No. 61 Group RAF (14 January 1957 – 31 December 1959)
- Closed – 31 December 1959

== Current use ==
Since September 1962 it became Pucklechurch Remand Centre and later Ashfield Young Offender Institution.

== See also ==
- List of former Royal Air Force stations
