= Parkfield Colliery =

Former UK coal mine

Coordinates: 51.49701°N 2.4361°W

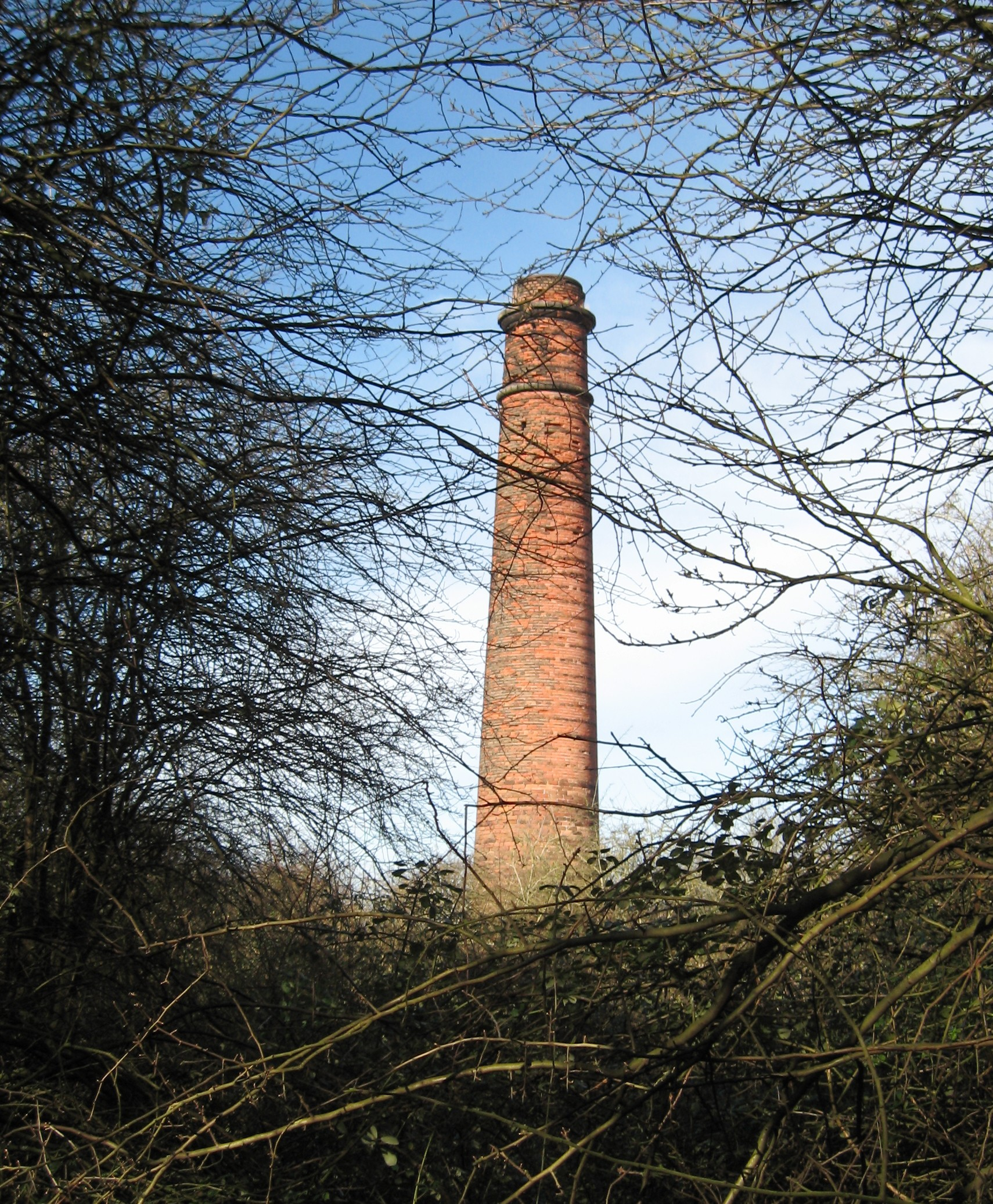
Parkfield Colliery chimney

Parkfield Colliery was a coal mine near Pucklechurch, South Gloucestershire, England. It was sunk in 1851 under the ownership of Handel Cossham. Coal was reached in 1853. The shaft was 840 ft (260 m) deep, but only the upper series of coal veins were worked. These were the Hard, the Top, the Hollybush and Great veins. The quality of the coal mined was extremely good, and was used for gas manufacture and house coal.

Handel Cossham died in 1890 and the pit was put up for sale. (Along with other pits he owned at Deep Pit, South Pit and Speedwell.) It was purchased by Bristol United Collieries, owners of Dean Lane, Easton, Hanham, Pennywell Road and Whitehall collieries. They formed a new company to manage their assets called The Bedminster, Easton, Kingswood and Parkfield Collieries Ltd.

A survey of Parkfield Colliery at the time of sale noted that it had two horizontal direct-acting steam winding engines each with 28 in (71 cm) cylinders, a 4 ft (1.2 m) stroke and a drum 15 ft (4.6 m) in diameter. These had been made by Teague & Chew of Cinderford in the Forest of Dean. There were two 38 ft (12 m) high headgears, each with two pulley wheels of 15 ft (4.6 m) diameter. Steam was provided by four Lancashire boilers which measured 27 by 7 ft (8.2 by 2.1 m). A ventilating fan measured 18 by 7 ft (5.5 by 2.1 m) and was driven by a pair of horizontal engines which had 14 in (36 cm) cylinders and a 16 in (41 cm) stroke. A Cornish pumping engine had a 54 in (1.4 m) cylinder and a 7 ft (2.1 m) stroke and was powered by two Lancashire boilers.

The pit had an endless haulage system comprising a beam engine and two galvanized ropes, each 990 ft (300 m) in length. Underground there were three engines for haulage, 5,250 ft (1.60 km) of single T-headed rails, 4,350 ft (1,330 m) of bridge rails and 5,400 ft (1,600 m) of tram bridge rails.

The 1896 List of Mines worked under the Coal Mines Regulation Act states that the colliery employed 292 people underground, and 49 on the surface. The manager was J. T. Onions and the under-manager was John Bullough.

In 1914 Parkfield was bought by Sir Frank Beauchamp, owner of a number of collieries in the Radstock area, and another company, the East Bristol Collieries Ltd. was formed.

By 1936 flooding was becoming problematic and, combined with increasing pumping costs and decreasing coal reserves, the pit became uneconomic. It closed on 15 August of that year.

Brandy Bottom Colliery, which used steam-powered machinery in the 19th century, has been scheduled as an ancient monument.
