= Ellacombe =

Ellacombe may refer to:

- "Ellacombe", a tune to which several hymns are sung, including "Hosanna, Loud Hosanna" and "The Day of Resurrection"
- Ellacombe apparatus, a mechanism for ringing bells
- Ellacombe, Devon, district of Torquay, Devon, England
- Ellacombe (surname), a surname
- Ellacombe Football Club, English football club based in Torquay, Devon
