= Henry Dennis (sheriff) =

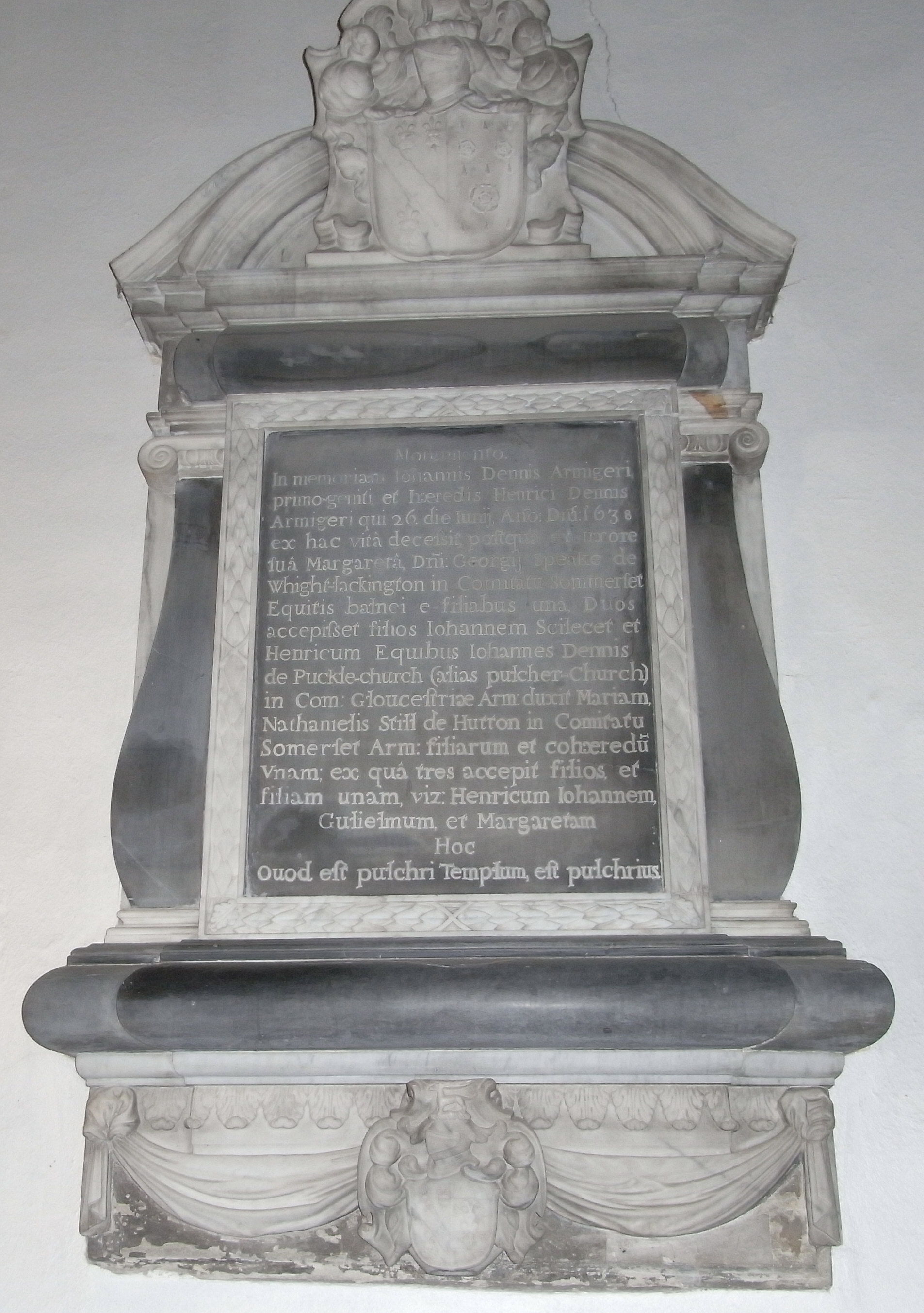
Dennis memorial tablet, Pucklechurch parish church, erected post 1660. In memory of John Dennis(d.1660) and his father Henry Dennis(died 1638)

Henry Dennis (Feb 1594 – 26 June 1638) was High Sheriff of Gloucestershire in 1629. He was lord of the manor of Pucklechurch, Gloucestershire. The Dennis family produced more Sheriffs of Gloucestershire than any other family. Like many members of the Gloucestershire gentry he refused to take a knighthood at the coronation of King Charles I in 1625, for which he paid a composition of £25.

== Origins ==
He was baptised in February 1594 in the parish church of St Thomas a Becket, Pucklechurch. He was the eldest son and heir of John "Dennys"(d.1609) the angling poet, by Elianor Millett, daughter of Thomas Millett of Warwickshire. He was aged only 15 on his father's death. The Denys family became established in Gloucestershire in about 1379 when Sir Gilbert Denys(d.1422) moved from Waterton, Bridgend in Glamorgan, Wales to marry the young widow Margaret Corbet(1352–1398), the sole heiress of her paternal manors of Siston, Alveston and Earthcott Green. The family name changed from its mediaeval spelling after about 1600 to Dennis. The earliest record of the family is in a Glamorgan Latin charter of 1258, where Willelmus le Deneys appears as a witness to an exchange of land between Gilbert de Turberville of Coity Castle and Margam Abbey. This early form of the name in Norman French can be translated as "The Dane", and the name was generally Latinised to Dacus, the adjectival form of Dacia, the mediaeval Latin name for Denmark.

== Marriages ==
He married twice:

- Firstly aged 21 in 1615 Margaret Speake(d.1622), a daughter of Sir George Speake, KB, of Whitelackington, Somerset, by Philippa Rosewell, daughter of William Rosewell(c. 1520–1567) of Devon, Solicitor-General to Queen Elizabeth I.

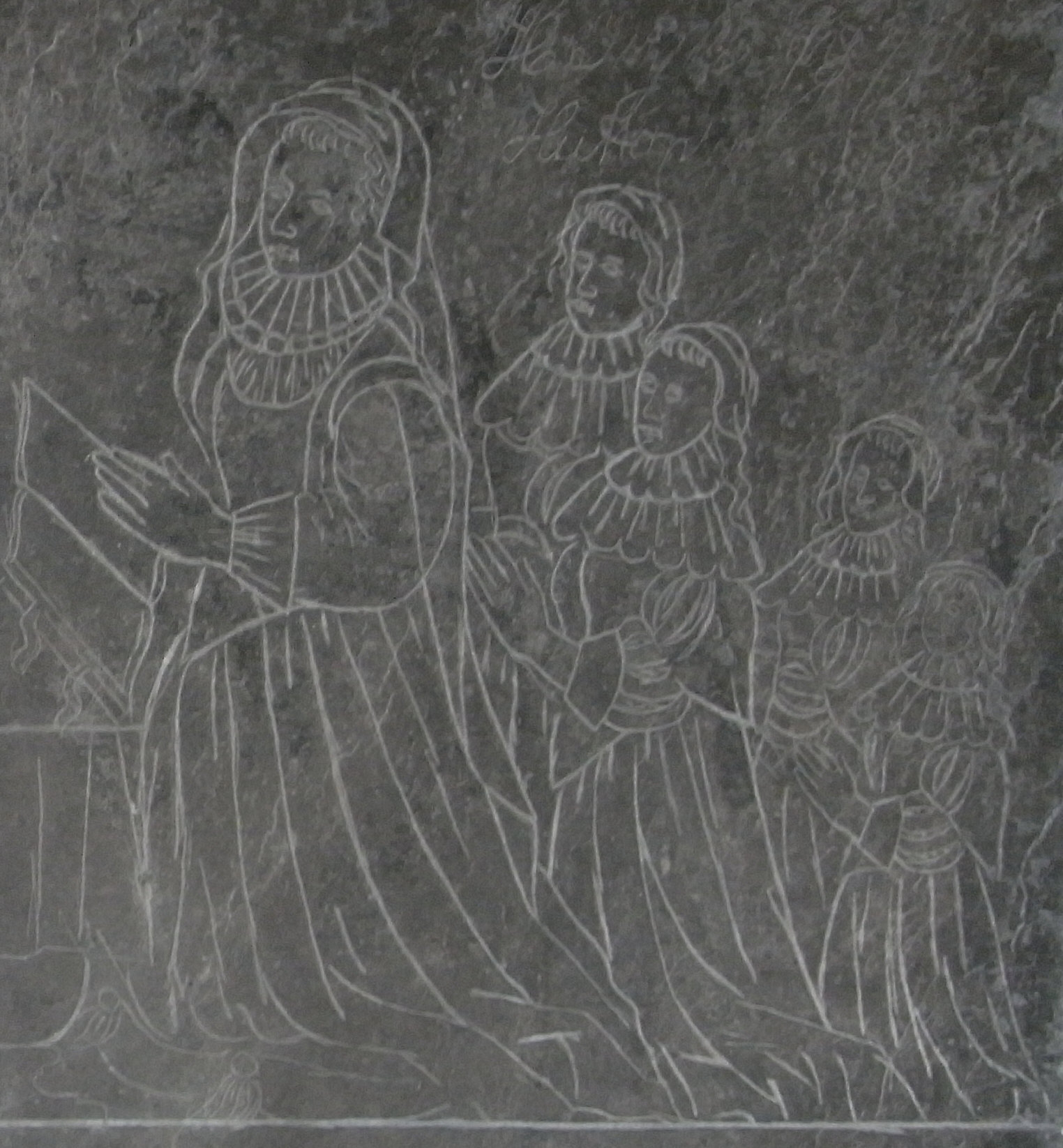
Jane Whitmore, widow of Nathaniel Still(d.1626), with their daughters, the youngest of whom is Mary Still. Detail from mural monument to Nathaniel Still, Hutton Church, 1626

- Secondly, after 1626, Jane Whitmore(1587–1639), who was buried at Bath Abbey, widow of Nathaniel Still(d.1626) of Hutton, Somerset, son of John Still(1543–1607/8), Bishop of Bath & Wells, who purchased Hutton Court in 1604. Jane Whitmore was a daughter of William Whitmore(d.1593), a haberdasher of Balmes Manor, Hackney and of Apley Hall, Shropshire. Jane's nephew was Sir Thomas Whitmore, 1st Baronet(1612–1653). There is a stone sculpted memorial to Nathaniel Still in the parish church of Hutton, showing him and his wife and children kneeling in prayer.

== Progeny ==
He had the following two sons by his first wife:

- John Dennis (1616–1660), High Sheriff of Gloucestershire in 1649. He was patron of the church of Oldbury on the Hill, Glos. in 1641. He married in about 1639 Mary Still(d.18/8/1698), daughter of Nathaniel Still of Hutton, Somerset, who was therefore the daughter of his step-mother Jane Whitmore, who died in the same year, a year after the death of John's father and her 2nd husband Henry.
- Henry Dennis (1620–1649), died aged 29, buried at Pucklechurch

== Residence ==
"OldHall" or "Great House", Pucklechurch, believed to have been the manor house. 19th-century artist's impression of the supposed original seven-gabled form of the house, which in its 2011 form, known as "Moat House", retains only the right-most three gables

It is not known with certainty which house in the village was the caput of the manor, that is to say the "manor house", in which the Dennis family would have lived. The manor appears to have had no resident lord of the manor until after the Dissolution of the Monasteries, before which time the manor was held as demesne lands of the Bishop of Bath and Wells. The Denys family had held the farm of Pucklechurch from about 1400, and were resident at the adjacent manor of Siston, thus no manor house was needed. The canons of Bath & Wells did however regularly visit their manor to hold a manorial court, and there must have existed a suitable hall-type building for this purpose. It is thought however that the cadet branch of the Dennis family, which became lords of the manor after the Dissolution, lived in the 17th-century house now called "Moat House", but shown on tithe maps as "Great House", also known formerly as "Old Hall". This house now retains only the right-most three of what are believed to have been its original seven gables to its front elevation. The ground floor front left room was formerly the ante-room to the great hall and has a fine plaster ceiling with large Tudor roses at its corners, with in its centre a ribbed pattern with fruit and flowers, and fully panelled walls. In the roof one arched-brace collar truss and one pair of windbraces survive, probably over the former solar wing.

== Death and burial ==
He died on 26 June 1638, as his monument in Pucklechurch Church states, and was buried on the same day as the parish register records.

== Monument ==
The following monument inscribed in slate (or black marble) within a decorative marble frame was erected post 1660 in Pucklechurch parish church, on the wall of the north aisle, one of two monuments to the Dennis family:

Monumento... In memoriam Johannis Dennis Armigeri, primo-geniti et haeredis Henrici Dennis Armigeri qui 26 die Junii Anno Domini 1638 ex hac vita decessit postquam ex uxore sua Margareta Domini Georgii Speake de Whight-lackington in Comitatu Sommerset Equitis balnei e filiabus una, Duos accepisset filios Johannem Scilecet et Henricum Equibus. Johannes Dennis de Puckle-church (alias pulcher-Church) in Comitatu Gloucestriae Armiger duxit Mariam, Nathanielis Still de Hutton in Comitatu Somerset Armigeris filiarum et cohaeredum Unam; ex qua tres accepit filios, et filiam unam, viz: Henricum, Johannem, Gulielmum et Margaretam. ...Hoc Quod est pulchri Templum, est pulchrius.

Translated thus:

By this monument what is a beautiful temple is become more beautiful.

In memory of John Dennis Esquire, first-born and heir of Henry Dennis Esquire who on the 26th day of June in the year of Our Lord 1638 departed from this life after he had received from his wife Margaret, one out of the daughters of George Speake Lord of Whight-lackington in the county of Somerset, Knight of the Bath, two sons, that is to say John and Henry (knights?). John Dennis of Puckle-church (otherwise pulcher-Church) in the county of Gloucester, Esquire, married Mary, one of the daughters and co-heiresses of Nathaniel Still of Hutton in the county of Somerset, Esquire; from whom he received three sons and one daughter, that is to say: Henry, John, William, and Margaret.

The text plays on the Latin word pulcher meaning "beautiful", as mediaeval scribes often Latinised the name of the manor to Pulcher-Church. The monument includes on its top an escutcheon of the Dennis arms impaling the arms of Still: Sable goutte argent, 3 roses of the last seeded or barbed vert. These arms, granted by Sir William Dethick, Garter King of Arms, on 10 April 1593 on his elevation to the bishopric, can be seen on the tomb of John Still(1543–1607) Bishop of Bath & Wells in Wells Cathedral, in the chapel leading from the north aisle to the Chapter House. On a helm above the escutcheon is sculpted the Dennis crest of a wolf passant.

== Sources ==
- Maclean, Sir John (ed.) The Visitation of the County of Gloucester Taken in the Year 1623 by Henry Chitty and John Phillipot, London, 1885. pp. 49–53, Dennis.
- Barnard Papers, Bristol Archives, P/Puc/HM/1. Correspondence 1889–90 between Rev. Lionel Barnard, vicar of Pucklechurch and Samuel Tucker of London, grandson of John Dennis(1779–1864) of Dorking, H.M. Receiver General of Excise & author of "A Handbook of Dorking", whose bookplate shows the arms of Dennis of Gloucestershire & whose purported descent from that family Mr Tucker was investigating, ultimately unsuccessfully. Includes a detailed pedigree of the Dennis family.
- Jewers, Arthur John. Wells Cathedral: Its Monumental Inscriptions and Heraldry, together with the Heraldry of the Palace, Deanery, and Vicar's Close, with Annotations from Wills, Registers, etc., and Illustrations of Arms, pp. 146–150, Bishop Still
