= Bitton =

Village in South Gloucestershire, England

Coordinates: 51.424802°N 2.460038°W

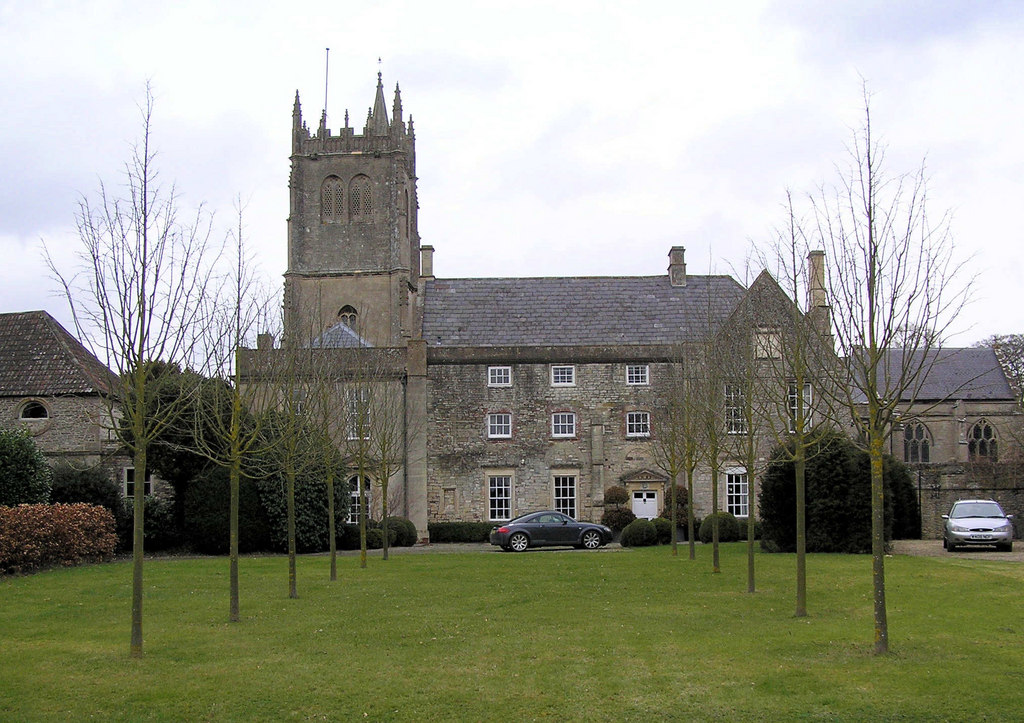

- Location within Gloucestershire
- Population: 9,459 (2021 census)
- Unitary authority: South Gloucestershire
- Ceremonial county: Gloucestershire
- Region: South West
- Country: England
- Sovereign state: United Kingdom
- Post town: Bristol
- Postcode district: BS30
- Police: Avon and Somerset
- Fire: Avon
- Ambulance: South Western
- UK Parliament: North East Somerset and Hanham

Bitton is a village and civil parish in the South Gloucestershire district of Gloucestershire, England. It is 7.6 miles (12.2 km) east of the centre of Bristol. The River Boyd flows through the village. The civil parish had a population of 9,459 at the most 2021 census. In addition to Bitton village, the parish includes the villages of Swineford, Upton Cheyney, Beach, Oldland Common, North Common, and part of Willsbridge.

== Governance ==
For elections to South Gloucestershire Council, Bitton is in Bitton and Oldland Common electoral ward. Formerly, there was a Bitton ward, which covered a smaller area than the civil parish.

Historically, Bitton was in Langley and Swinehead Hundred. It was in the Warmley Rural District of the administrative county of Gloucestershire from 1894 until 1974. In 1974, it became part of Kingswood borough in the newly created County of Avon. In 1996, Avon was abolished and Kingswood merged into the new unitary authority district of South Gloucestershire.

== Demographics ==
Census population of Bitton parish
Census	Population	Female	Male	Households	Source
2001	9,307	4,771	4,536	3,583	
2011	9,171	4,670	4,501	3,694	
2021	9,459	4,824	4,635	3,868	

== Transport ==
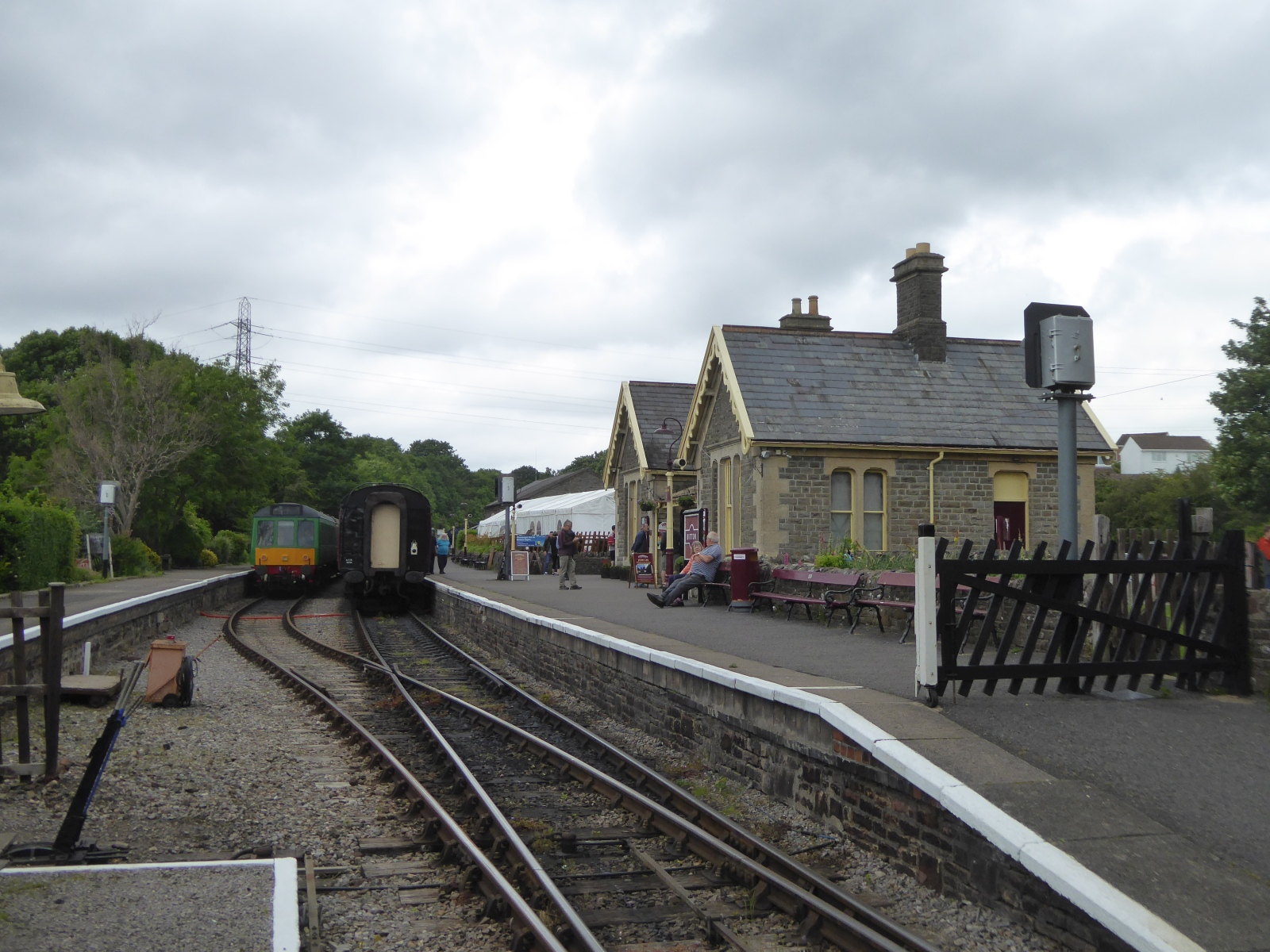

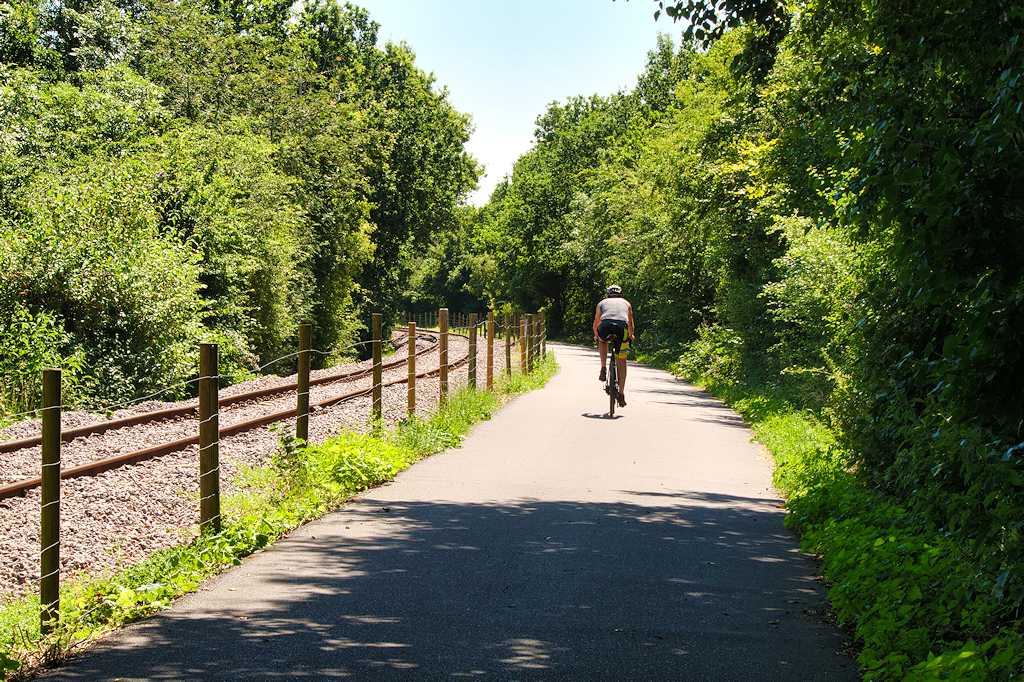

The A431 road runs through the village, linking Willsbridge to the north-west with Kelston to the south-east.

The village is served by bus routes 19, 37, 441, 443 and 684, which operate along the A431, providing services to Bath, Bristol, and surrounding communities.

The heritage Avon Valley Railway is based at Bitton railway station.

The Bristol and Bath Railway Path, part of the National Cycle Network, runs alongside the railway.

== Sport ==
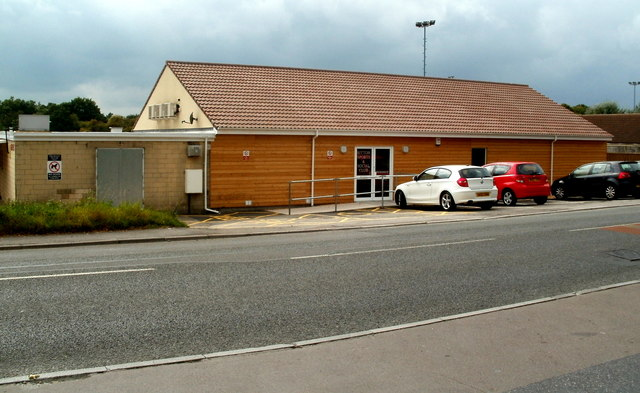
Sports and Social Club

Bitton A.F.C. are the local football team. The club plays at the recreation ground, immediately south of the A431 and just west of the village.

Bitton CC are the local cricket team and also play at the recreation ground.

Bitton Road Runners is a running club based in the east of Bristol which caters for runners of all abilities. Founded in 1986 to help people better enjoy the sport of running, it has grown into a thriving club with over 300 members across its junior and senior sections.

== Notable people ==
H. T. Ellacombe, the inventor of the Ellacombe apparatus used for bell-ringing, was curate from 1817 to 1835, and vicar from 1835 to 1850. His son H. N. Ellacombe, vicar from 1850 to 1916, was active in the 1860s in the distribution of the robust, large, early-flowering snowdrop Galanthus nivalis 'Atkinsii' "that grew at the south wall in his garden in Bitton." Bitton is the birthplace of author Dick King Smith and actress Richenda Carey, and was home to television presenter Noel Edmonds. Harold Crofton Sleigh, founder of H.C.Sleigh Shipping Company and Golden Fleece Petroleum Company, lived in Belmont House with his parents, in 1881. The landscape and equestrian painter Allen Culpepper Sealy was born in the village in 1850.

== Bibliography ==
- Ellacombe, Henry Thomas History of the Manor of Bitton, 1869.
- Ellacombe, Henry Thomas History of the Parish of Bitton, 1881.
