= HM Prison Ashfield =

Sex offenders prison near Bristol, England

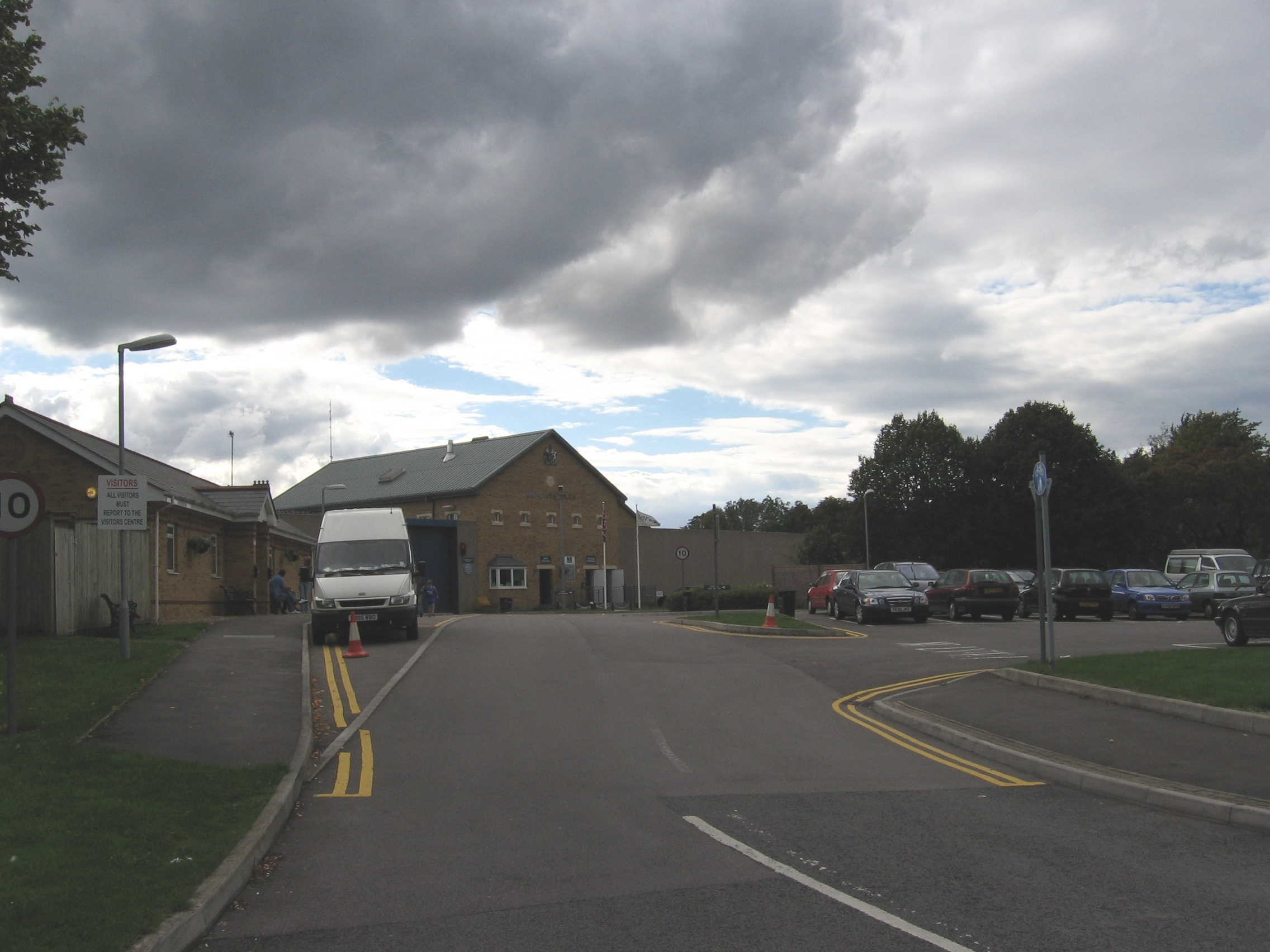
- Interactive map of HM Prison Ashfield
- Location: Pucklechurch, South Gloucestershire; 51.4815°N 2.4397°W
- Status: Operational
- Security class: Adult Male/Category C
- Capacity: 412 (Oct 2017)
- Opened: 1999
- Managed by: Serco
- Governor: Rachel Barras

HM Prison Ashfield (formerly Pucklechurch Remand Centre) is an adult male sex offenders prison located in the village of Pucklechurch (near Bristol), in South Gloucestershire, England. The prison is operated by Serco. From 1999 to 2013 it housed young offenders, before being converted to a prison for adults.

== History ==
=== Pucklechurch Remand Centre ===
The prison stands on the site of a former Royal Air Force facility, RAF Pucklechurch. This was transferred to HM Prison Service in September 1962, and the site used for the construction of a remand centre, which opened as Pucklechurch Remand Centre in 1965. It was further expanded in 1978. The centre was destroyed in a riot in 1990.

=== Ashfield Prison ===
Ashfield Prison was built on the site of the remand centre, and opened in 1999. It was the first private prison in the United Kingdom to house young offenders. The prison was soon mired in controversy after repeated riots and reports of poor management. Conditions at the prison became so bad in 2003 that the Youth Justice Board withdrew prisoners from Ashfield, and threatened to recommend that the prison should be taken over by the public sector. Conditions improved however, and the prison (under new management) was given a good inspection report the following year.

In 2006, staff at Ashfield won a Health team award from the Public Servants of the Year Awards. The award was made in recognition of the staff's dedication to improving healthcare and personal health education for inmates held at Ashfield.

In March 2008, a new wing for first-time offenders was opened at Ashfield. The wing was designed to create a positive environment for new inmates, and also has amenities for prisoners aged 15 and 16.

In 2013 an inspection report that concluded offenders were "exposed to unacceptable levels of violence", including bones broken after the use of force by staff. Ashfield was converted to an adult male prison for sex offenders from July 2013 and a Treatment site from 2014.

In 2024 Serco was awarded a new contract after competitive tendering, to operate the prison for a further 10 years with an expiry of 31 October 2034

== Notable former inmates ==
- Stephen Fry (at Pucklechurch Remand Centre)
