= The Secrets of Angling =

Book by John Dennys

Title page of first edition (1613)in the Bodleian, shelfmark 8vo.D 15 Art.

Title page of 3rd edition, 1630, cropped fore-edge and foot. Folger Shakespeare Library, Washington D.C.

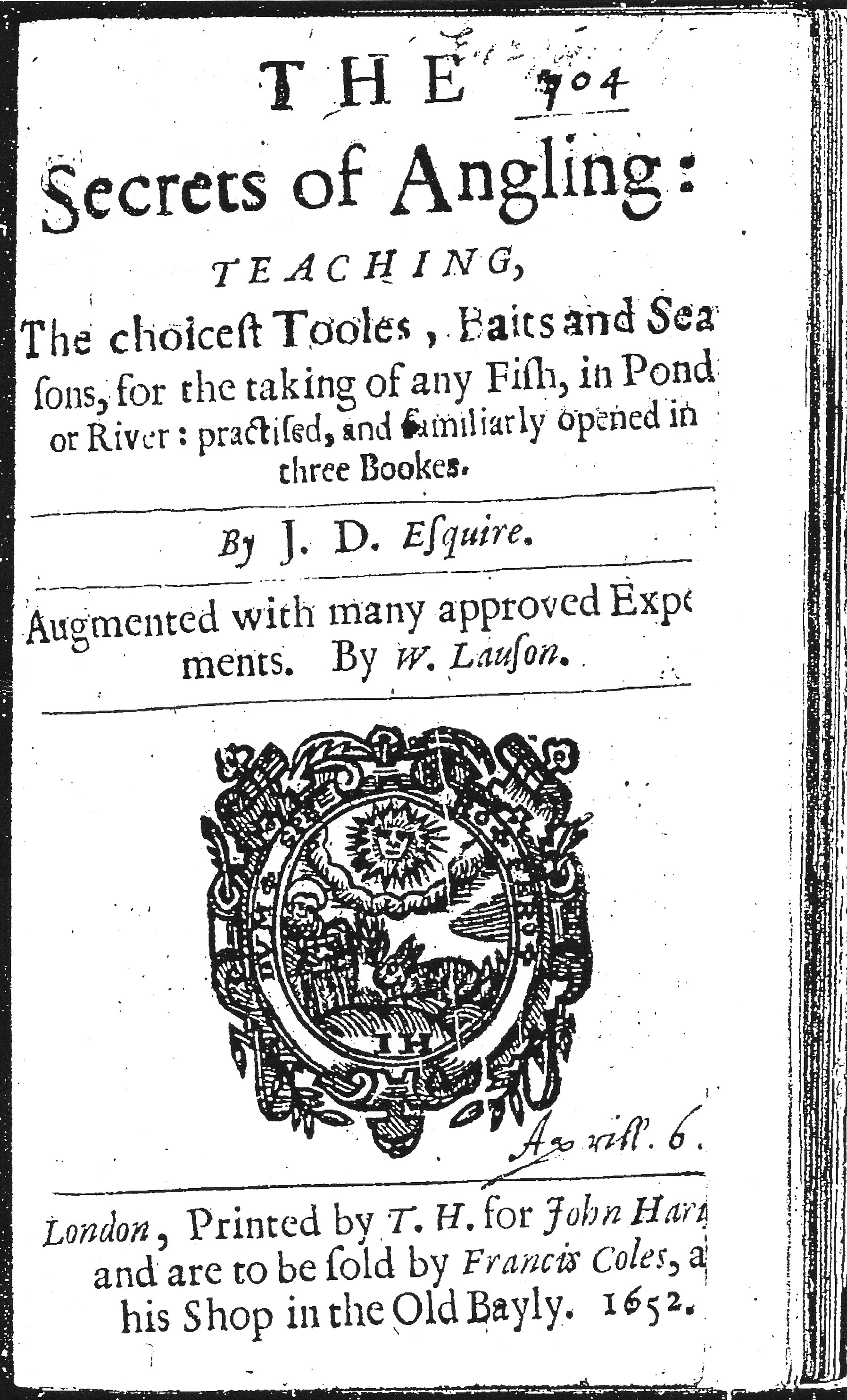
Title page 4th edition, 1652. Cropped at fore-edge.

The Secrets of Angling was a book written by John Dennys. It was the earliest English poetical treatise on fishing, first published in 1613 in London. A didactic pastoral poem in 3 books, in the style of Virgil's Georgics. It was published in 4 editions until 1652, examples of which are amongst the rarest books in existence.

Dennys's poem was published anonymously, 4 years posthumously, and for 198 years the poem was misattributed, its authorship remaining a mystery until 1811.

== Publication and authorship ==
First published in 1613, Dennys's book was published after his death. (Note: In the dedication, Roger Jackson mentioned that the book was published after the author's death.) The author was identified by the initials J.D., and had been attributed to up to 6 poets. In 1811 the authorship was determined from a "23mo Martii, 1612" (i.e., 1613) entry in the Stationers' Registers, which showed that Dennys authored the book. The Secrets of Angling was published in 4 editions, the last in 1652, and copies are amongst the rarest books in existence. (Note: "Perhaps there does not exist in the circle of English Literature a rarer book than this".)

The Secrets of Angling was the earliest English poetical treatise on fishing. (Note: Dame Julia Berners had written a brief prose treaty in the 2nd edition of the Book of St. Albans, 1496, "Treatyse on Fysshynge with an Angle". Reportedly one copy of a book exists that was published in London in 1577 by William Samuel, "The Arte of Angling" that was a work in prose. It lists 13 Virtues almost identical to Dennys's and consists of a dialogue between Viator and Piscator, the characters in Walton's The Complete Angler. It is not clear if it is a forgery. 3 or 4 other prose treatises appeared before 1613.) Morgan George Watkins stated that the "tone of the poem is religious. It is full of lofty sentiments and natural descriptions, a poetical atmosphere surrounding even the commonest tools of the angler's craft."

== Dedication ==
The first edition contained a dedication by "R.I."(Roger Jackson who was the publisher) to John Harborne of Tackley, County of Oxford, whom he called "My much respected friend." (Note: John Harborne (1582–1651) was a wealthy merchant from the Middle Temple who had just purchased the manor of Tackley the year before publication, in 1612. He is believed to have built elaborate geometric fish ponds, the remains of which were visible in 1983.)

== Structure of the Work ==
A didactic pastoral poem in 3 books, totaling 151 verses each of 8 lines, in the style of Virgil's Georgics.

=== Book 1 ===
1. The antiquity of Angling, with the art of Fishing and Fishing in general.
2. The lawfulness, pleasure and profit thereof & with all objections answered against it.
3. To know the season & times to provide the tools & how to chuse the best & the maner how to make them fit to take each severall fish.

=== Book 2 ===
1. The Angler's experience, how to use his tools & his baits to make profit by his game.
2. What fish is not taken with the Angle & what is & what is best for health.
3. In what waters & rivers to find each fish.

=== Book 3 ===
1. The 12 virtues & qualities which ought to be in every angler.
2. What weather, seasons & time of the yeare is best & worst & what houres of the day is best for sport.
3. To know each fishe's haunt and the times to take them. Also an obscure secret of an approved bait tending thereunto.

== Excerpts ==
=== First verse ===
The following is the first verse of Book 1:

Of angling and the art thereof I sing
What kind of tools it doth behove to have
And with what pleasing bayt a man may bring
The fish to bite within the watry wave.
A work of thanks to such as in a thing
Of harmless pleasure have regard to save
Their dearest soules from sinne and may intend
Of pretious time some part thereon to spend.

=== Earliest reel described ===
The work contains what is thought to be the first printed description of a reel:

Yet there remains of Fishing tooles to tell
Some other sorts that you must have as well
A little board the lightest you can find
but not so thin that it will breake or bend
Made smooth & plaine your lines thereon to winde
With battlements at every other end
Like to the bulwarke of some ancient towne
As well-walled Sylchester now raz-ed down.

=== River Boyd ===
The third verse of Book 1 refers to the rivers Boyd and Avon, and the villages of Doynton and Wick:

And thou sweet Boyd that with thy watry sway
Dost wash the cliffes of Deington and of Weeke
And through their Rockes with crooked winding way
Thy mother Avon runnest soft to seeke
In whose fayre streames the speckled Trout doth play
The Roche the Dace the Gudgin and the Bleeke
Teach me the skill with slender Line and Hooke
To take each Fish of River Pond and Brooke.

== Woodcut illustrations ==
The woodcut in the 1613 edition title represents an angler with a fish on his hook, and the motto, "Well fayre the pleasure that brings such treasure," and a man treading on a serpent with a sphere at the end of his rod and line labelled, "Hold hooke and line, then all is mine." The second edition, conjectured to be about 1620, is "augmented with approved experiments" by Lauson, and has the same woodcut on the title. The third edition, which may be 1630, was "printed at London for John" [Jackson], has a slightly different woodcut, with a varied motto, "Well feare the Pleasure, That yeelds such Treasure." The woodcut in the 4th edition title of the other editions here figures as frontispiece, the angler being dressed in the costume of a later period, and the flowers, foliage, etc., a little modified.

== Literary Merit ==
Bibliotheca Piscatoria recorded Thomas Westwood's description of Dennys, whom he found to be among the foremost writers and poets about angling. Similarly, Osmuch Lambert offers praise: "Dennys was both poet and angler born; his verses are admired and bespeak a natural love of the art whose praises he so quaintly sings." James Wilson said that his work "is remarkable for its beauty," part of which has been quoted by Walton.

Biographer Morgan George Watkins wrote that: "The author has chosen a measure at once sweet and full of power, and its interlinked melodies lure the reader onwards with much the same kind of pleasure as the angler experiences, who follows the murmuring of a favourite trout stream."

Marie Loretto Lilly stated in her book The Georgic that The Secrets of Angling "is not a great poem, but it should hold an honoured place for sweetness of verse, for its beauty of description and for the lessons that the poet so gently and happily teaches."

== Source of inspiration ==
Verses from the book have been quoted in other works, such as Izaak Walton in the first part of the first chapter of his 1653 edition of The Compleat Angler. (Note: Piscator to Venator: "Will you hear the wish of another angler, and the commendation of his happy life, which he also sings in verse; namely, Jo. Davors, Esq." (verses) "Sir, I am glad my memory has not lost these verses, because they are somewhat more pleasant and more suitable to May-day than my harsh discourse".) Gervase Markham also produced a prose version of The Secrets of Angling in 1614 in "The English Husbandman".

== Editions ==
- First edition: I.D. Esquire. (1613). The Secrets of Angling. London: Roger Jackson. 30 leaves. (Note: English Short Title Catalogue lists 4 copies: British Library, Bodleian Library, Yale University Sterling Memorial (Beinecke) Library, and Folger Shakespeare Library, Washington DC.)
- Second edition: I.D. Esquire. (ca. 1620) The Secrets of Angling. London: Roger Jackson. 35 leaves. (Note: Westwood conjectured that the second edition was printed about 1620.English Short Title Catalogue lists 2 copies: British Library, Corpus Christi College Library, Oxford.) It had annotations by William Lawson.
- Third edition: I.D. Esquire. (1630-1635) The Secrets of Angling. London: John Jackson. (Note: English Short Title Catalogue lists 2 copies: British Library, Folger Shakespeare Library, Washington DC.)
- Fourth edition: J.D. Esquire. (1652) The Secrets of Angling. London: T.H. for John Har(ison). 36 leaves. (Note: English Short Title Catalogue lists copies: British Library, Bodleian Library, Yale University (Beinecke) Library, Massachusetts Historical Society, Boston.)

Reprints were made in 1809, 1811–1813, 1877, 1883, 1885.
