= Doynton =

Village in Gloucestershire, England

Coordinates: 51°28′N 2°24′W

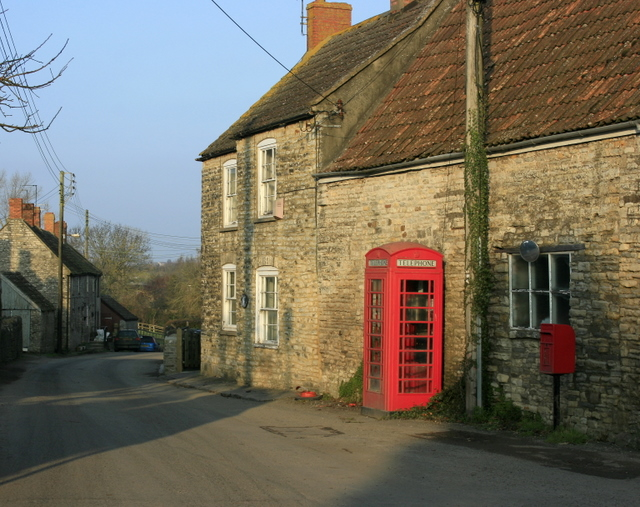

Doynton is a village in South Gloucestershire, England. The population of this village taken at the 2011 census was 320.

== Setting ==
Doynton is a village situated on the lower slopes of the Cotswolds, approximately two miles south-east of Pucklechurch. The River Boyd passes through the northern part of Doynton. The village is essentially linear in character with houses lining the four main roads into the village. Doynton lies within the Cotswold Area of Outstanding Natural Beauty.

== The village ==
Doynton has a pub called The Cross House, and a village hall. There is also a park and playing field. The village church is Holy Trinity Church which is noted for its herringbone masonry (around 12th century) on the south wall.

The historic core of Doynton was designated a conservation area in February 1983. The area of Doynton Mill and its immediate surroundings to the north of the village are not longer part of it as they are used for light industrial purposes. Doynton has a number of 17th or 18th century buildings, many of which are listed. These include Doynton House (grade II-listed), The Old Rectory (grade II-listed), The Old Brewery (grade II-listed) and Holy Trinity Church. Doynton has retained its village-like quality: indeed the tithe map of 1840 shows how little the village has changed since then.

== History ==
Doynton's history can be traced back to the Domesday Book (1086) in which the village is mentioned as having two mills. One was probably a corn mill and the other a tucking or fulling mill connected with the Cotswold woollen cloth industry. Both these mills were important to the survival of the village and were referred to again in historical records 500 years later. The tuck mill, however, is not mentioned after the middle of the 17th century. The corn mill continued in use until the 1950s marking nine centuries of service to the village. The mill wheel and old machinery were then broken up and electrically powered equipment installed. More recently a light engineering firm has taken over the site.

The Holy Trinity Church (grade II*-listed) is at the centre of the village. It was largely rebuilt between 1864 and 1867 but dates back to Saxon times. Its features include 12th-century herringbone masonry on the south wall - a style almost unique in this part of the country. It also features a 12th-century leper window, again situated in the south wall and the 13th-century Lady Chapel.

North-west of the church there is evidence of a group of mediaeval fishponds which provided a source of food to supplement the diet of villagers in the Middle Ages. Doynton had a rather elaborate group of ponds made by taking water from a stream via a leat (a man-made watercourse) to a group of rectangular ponds situated in the field.

Doynton and the River Boyd were immortalised by the poet and fisherman John Dennys, Squire of Pucklechurch, in his poem "The Secrets of Angling", the earliest English poetical treatise on fishing, published in 1613:

And thou sweet Boyd that with thy watry sway
Dost wash the cliffes of Deington and of Weeke
And through their Rockes with crooked winding way
Thy mother Avon runnest soft to seeke.
