= Pucklechurch =

Village and parish near Bristol, England

Coordinates: 51.4870°N 2.4353°W

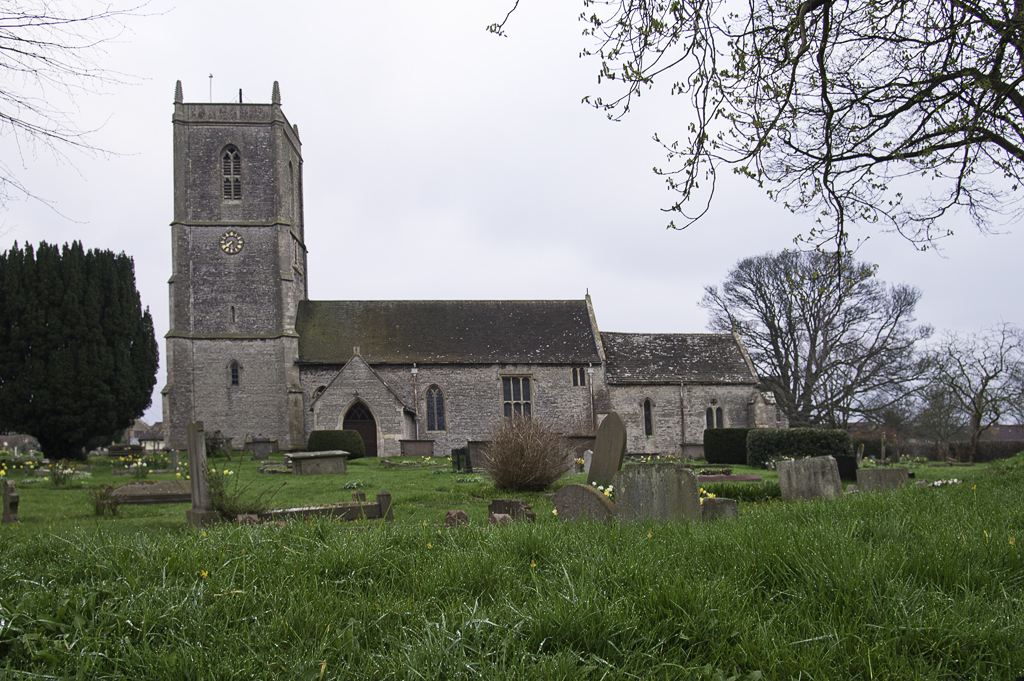
- St Thomas à Becket Church, grade I listed parish church

- Location within Gloucestershire
- Interactive map of Pucklechurch
- Population: 3,209 (2021 census)
- OS grid reference: ST698765
- Civil parish: Pucklechurch
- Unitary authority: South Gloucestershire
- Ceremonial county: Gloucestershire
- Region: South West
- Country: England
- Sovereign state: United Kingdom
- Post town: Bristol
- Postcode district: BS16
- Dialling code: 0117
- Police: Avon and Somerset
- Fire: Avon
- Ambulance: South Western
- UK Parliament: Thornbury and Yate

Pucklechurch is a village and civil parish in the South Gloucestershire district of Gloucestershire England. The parish also incorporates the hamlet of Shortwood to the west of Pucklechurch village, and Parkfield to the north-west, with a total population of 3,209 at the 2021 census data. The village dates back over a thousand years and was once the site of a royal hunting lodge, as it adjoined a large forest.

A Royal Air Force station called RAF Pucklechurch existed until 1959, when the site was transferred to HM Prison Service.

== Geography ==
Pucklechurch village is situated on a prominent landscape ridge that sits above Bristol and below the backdrop of the Cotswold escarpment. It is located 7.4 miles (11.9 km) east-northeast of Bristol city centre and 8.9 miles (14.3 km) northwest of the city of Bath. The parish as a whole sits within the Pucklechurch Ridge and Boyd Valley landscape character assessment area, as defined by South Gloucestershire Council. Settled areas sit within a diverse undulating rural landscape of mainly mixed farmland. A major defining influence to the north of the parish is the M4 motorway.

== History ==
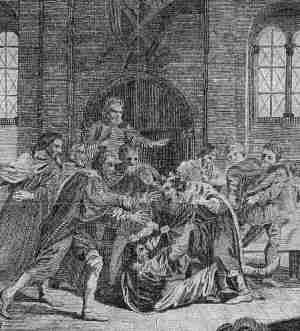
The Murder of King Edmund at Pucklechurch, drawn by Robert Smirke, published in Ashburton's History of England, 1793

The parish has archaeological and historic assets including a Bronze Age barrow cemetery on Shortwood Hill and the remains of a World War II barrage balloon depot. The earliest human activity in this area dates to the prehistoric period and archaeological evidence suggests it was inhabited during Roman times. It was of national importance in the Anglo-Saxon world, being situated on the edge of the Kingswood Forest. By the mid 900s it was a substantial Saxon settlement and royal administrative centre with a minster church.

=== Murder of King Edmund AD 946 ===
The Anglo-Saxon Chronicle states that King Edmund I was murdered at Pucklechurch, in 946: "A.D. 946. This year King Edmund died, on St. Augustine's mass day. That was widely known, how he ended his days: that Leof or Liofa stabbed him at Pucklechurch."

The name of the settlement comes from the Saxon which means 'Pucela's church'.

An area listed behind the Star Inn is thought to be the site of the king's lodge or palace, but as yet no archaeological evidence has been uncovered that supports this assertion. In 950 King Eadred gave land (at Pucelancyrcan) to the Abbey of Glastonbury.

=== Domesday Book ===
The Domesday Book of 1086 records this land as belonging to St Mary's church, which was in Glastonbury Abbey's grounds. It notes:

[The church of] St Mary of Glastonbury holds Pucklechurch. There are twenty hides. In demesne are six ploughs and twenty three villans and eight bordars with eighteen ploughs. There are ten slaves and six men render 100 ingots of iron less ten and in Gloucester one burgess pays 5d and two coliberts pay 34d and there are 3 Frenchmen and two mills rendering 100d. There are sixty acres (24 ha) of meadow and woodland half a league long and a half broad. It was worth £20, now £30 [to its overlord per year].

=== Ownership and construction of the existing church ===
The manor of Pucklechurch was held by the Bishop of Bath and Wells from 1275, who received it from Glastonbury Abbey, as a document in the Calendar of Bishops of Bath and Wells, dated April 1275 records:

Accord between Robert Bishop of Bath and Wells and John Abbot of Glastonbury, namely that whereas Robert late Abbot of Glastonbury and the convent quitclaimed to Walter late Bishop of Bath & Wells the manor and advowson [right to appoint the priest] of Pokeleschyrch [sic] ...

The church of St Thomas a Becket largely dates to the 1200s and 1300s from the time when it was under the Bishop's patronage. Its listing emphasises how visible the original stonework fabric is and says "it is substantially a medieval building"; its Victorian amendments were "carried out by R. C. Carpenter, and later by J. D. Sedding ... of good quality, reflecting the involvement of these experienced ecclesiastical architects". Of particular note there are the remains of two effigial monuments in the lady chapel that date to the 1370s and attributed to William de Cheltenham (d. between 1371 and 1374) and his wife Eleanor.

=== Farmed to Denys family ===
To save his see from the administrative burden of collecting all the rents within the manor, the bishop farmed the manor to Sir Gilbert Denys (d. 1422), who already held the nearby manor of Siston. This gave Denys the right to keep all the rents he could collect in exchange for an annual one-off payment of £40. Payments made by Denys are recorded in the communar's accounts of the See of Bath and Wells.

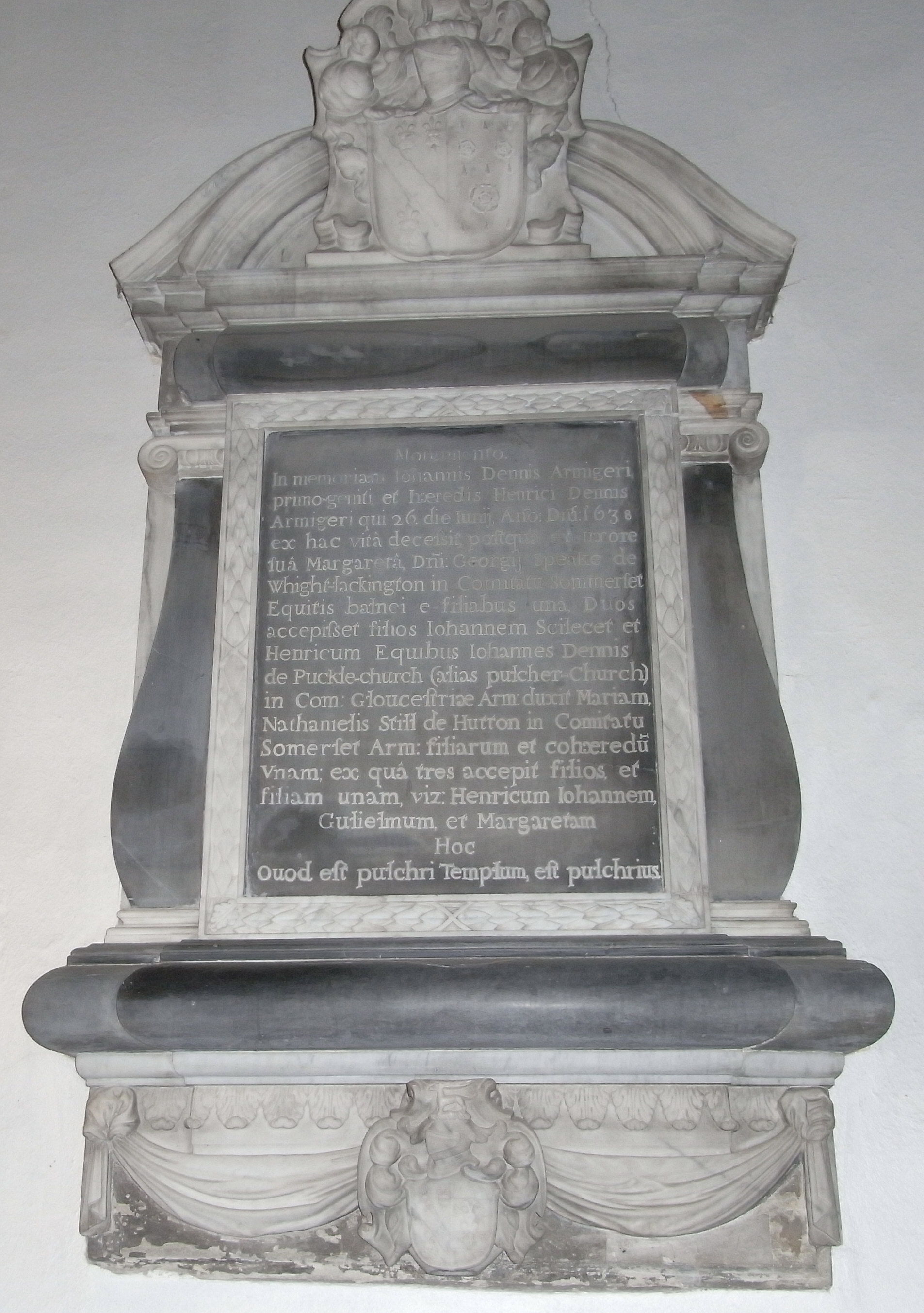
Slate memorial to John Dennis (d. 1660) and his father Henry Dennis (d. 1638). Pucklechurch Church, north aisle

It appears that Denys held the manor until his death in 1422, although records are not available to confirm this. At the dissolution of the monasteries the manor was granted to William Herbert, 1st Earl of Pembroke from whom it was acquired by Sir Maurice Denys (d. 1561), treasurer of Calais and builder of Siston Court. From him the manor passed to his cousin Hugh Denys, and a cadet (younger) branch of the Denys family became lords of the manor of Pucklechurch until the death of William Dennis in 1701, last of the male line. The Heralds' Visitation of Gloucestershire in 1623 records John Denys (d. 1559) as "of Pucklechurch", High Sheriff of Gloucestershire in 1551. He was the youngest son of Sir Walter Denys (d. 1505) of Alveston, buried in Olveston Church, and the youngest brother of Sir William Denys (d. 1535) of the adjacent manor of Dyrham. In St Thomas a Becket Church is a memorial to Henry Dennis (d. 1638), Squire of Pucklechurch, son of John Dennys, fisherman and poet who wrote the earliest English poetical treatise on fishing, "The Secrets of Angling", published in 1613.

=== Coal mining ===
Coal has been extracted from the area since at least early medieval times.

Bristol Archives holds documents detailing the leases and sale of the coal mining rights by Mary and Elizabeth Dennis, the co-heiresses of William Dennis (d. 1701). A deed dated 2 February 1719 reads:

Articles of Agreement – 1) Mary Dennis of Westminster, Middx. singlewoman 2) John Whitewood of Mangotsfield, Glos., coalminer and Daniell Alsopp of Pucklechurch, Glos. yeo. – granting licence to dig for coals upon farm in or near Shortwood in Pucklechurch rented from her by Daniell Alsopp and to carry away and sell the same. Term 120 years. Whitewood and Alsopp to pay her 3s. for every 20s. worth of coal. Covenants re.making good of damage, appointment of clerk to keep accounts, etc.

In 1851 Handel Cossham established the Kingswood Coal Company, which included a mine in Pucklechurch. By 1900, the Bristol coalfields were producing nearly 500,000 tonnes. Parkfield Colliery operated in Pucklechurch from 1851 to 1936. Brandy Bottom Colliery, part of Parkfield Colliery is a scheduled monument that contains the remains of a complete 19th century steam powered colliery.

=== Shortwood brickworks ===
Shortwood Brick and Tile Company began producing bricks in the late 1800s and closed in 1969, having been acquired by the Cattybrook Brick Company in 1903. It made use of the good quality red clay found above the coal seams. This clay was fired to make millions of bricks for local buildings – at peak production, the works produced more than half a million bricks per week.

=== War memorial, World War II and RAF Pucklechurch ===
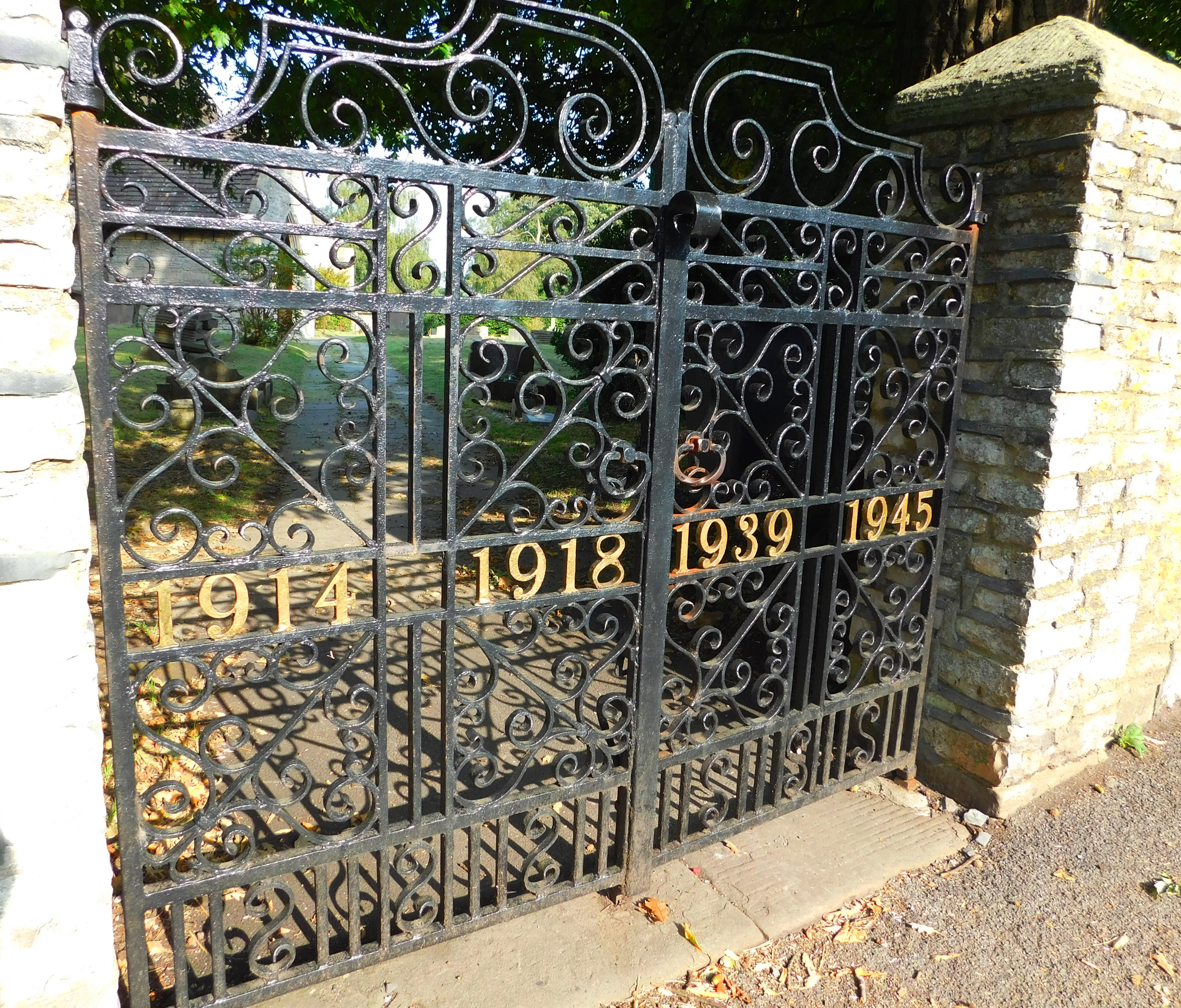
Pucklechurch war memorial gates

Memorials to the fallen dead take the form of two brass shields on the south wall inside the church; one was erected after the First World War and the other after the Second World War. The physical war memorial to both World Wars is a pair of wrought iron gates set in the churchyard wall on the west side. The gates are black with gold painted dates, 1914–18 and 1939–45 set centrally.

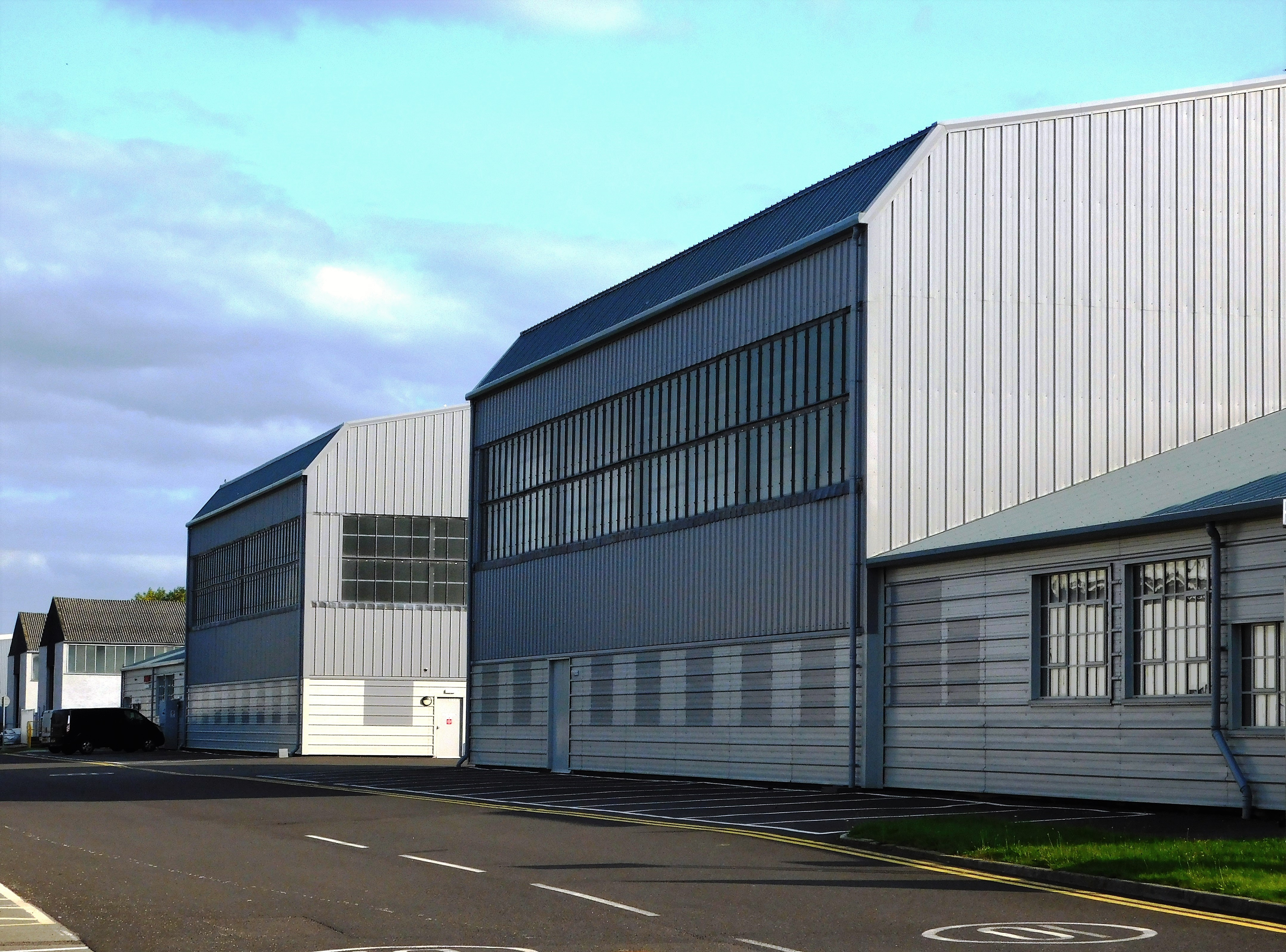
Repurposed Grade II listed WW2 barrage balloon hangars at Pucklechurch

During World War II the No.11 Balloon Centre, a barrage balloon depot, was built here. The Pucklechurch site consisted of four balloon workshops, two of which survive today. Balloons damaged during enemy attacks were brought to Pucklechurch for repair and testing. The balloons were tethered by cables to concrete blocks which were set in a circle in the ground and raised and lowered by winch. The blocks of one such mooring site survive in-situ to the west of 'The Moorings'. Both the mooring site and the workshops are Grade II listed. Although most mooring sites at Pucklechurch have been lost to development, evidence of another feature associated with the Balloon Centre is located to the north of Hawthorn Close. These sites are all that survive from the Barrage Balloon Centre in Pucklechurch. After the war this became a non-flying Royal Air Force station called RAF Pucklechurch until 1959. In 1962 the site was transferred to HM Prison Service.

On 6 October 1940, a De Havilland DH.91 Albatross crash landed in Pucklechurch after a fuel line ruptured causing all four engines to fail. All occupants and residents were uninjured.

=== Prison ===
From 1962, the Pucklechurch Remand Centre was built on the RAF Pucklechurch site, opened in 1965 and expanded in 1978. The remand centre was destroyed in a riot in 1990. This made headline national news and was discussed in the House of Lords.

The site on the edge of the developed area became Ashfield Young Offender Institution, which opened in 1999. In 2013 it was closed for young offenders following a critical inspection report that concluded offenders were "exposed to unacceptable levels of violence" and in June 2013 the Ministry for Justice announced it will become a closed adult prison dealing with sex offenders.

== Governance ==
Pucklechurch is part of the Thornbury and Yate UK parliament constituency.

The parish falls in the Boyd Valley electoral ward, which elects two councillors to South Gloucestershire Council. Local government at parish level is delivered by the parish council.

Historically, Pucklechurch was in Chipping Sodbury rural district from 1894 to 1935, and Sodbury rural district from 1935 to 1945. From 1974, it was in the Northavon district of the County of Avon, until the creation of South Gloucestershire unitary authority in 1996.

== Amenities ==
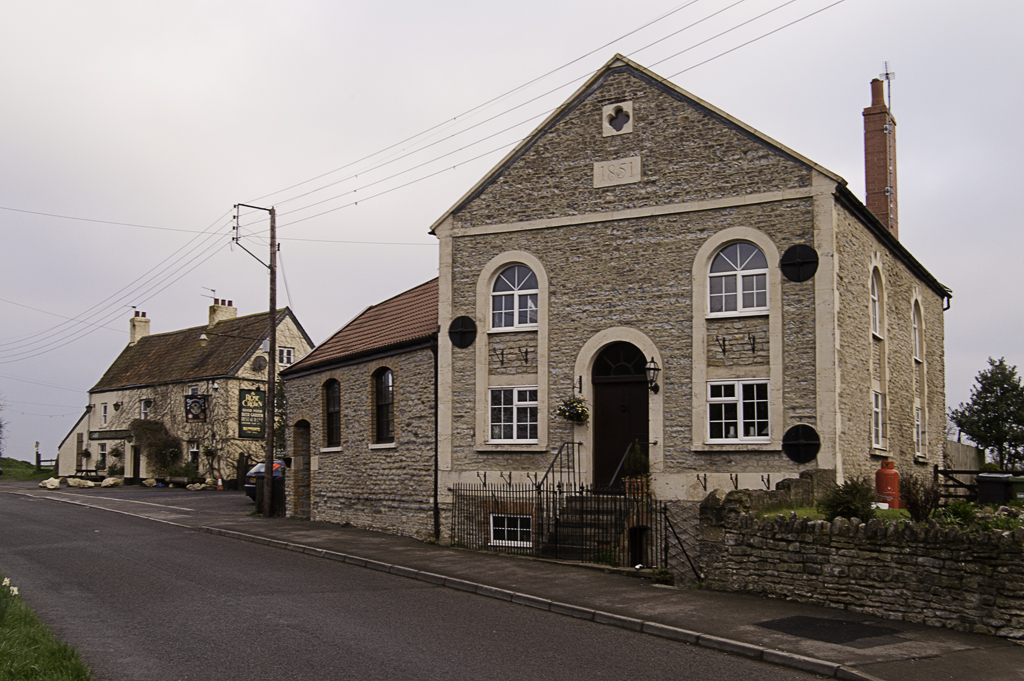
Rose & Crown Inn and former school

Pucklechurch village contains a Church of England church and a Methodist church, as well as Pucklechurch Community Centre. It is served by a GP surgery, a post office and amenity store, a small bakery, café, two public houses, two social clubs, several beauty and hair salons, a pet crematorium, a number of stables and two care homes.

=== Recreation Ground ===
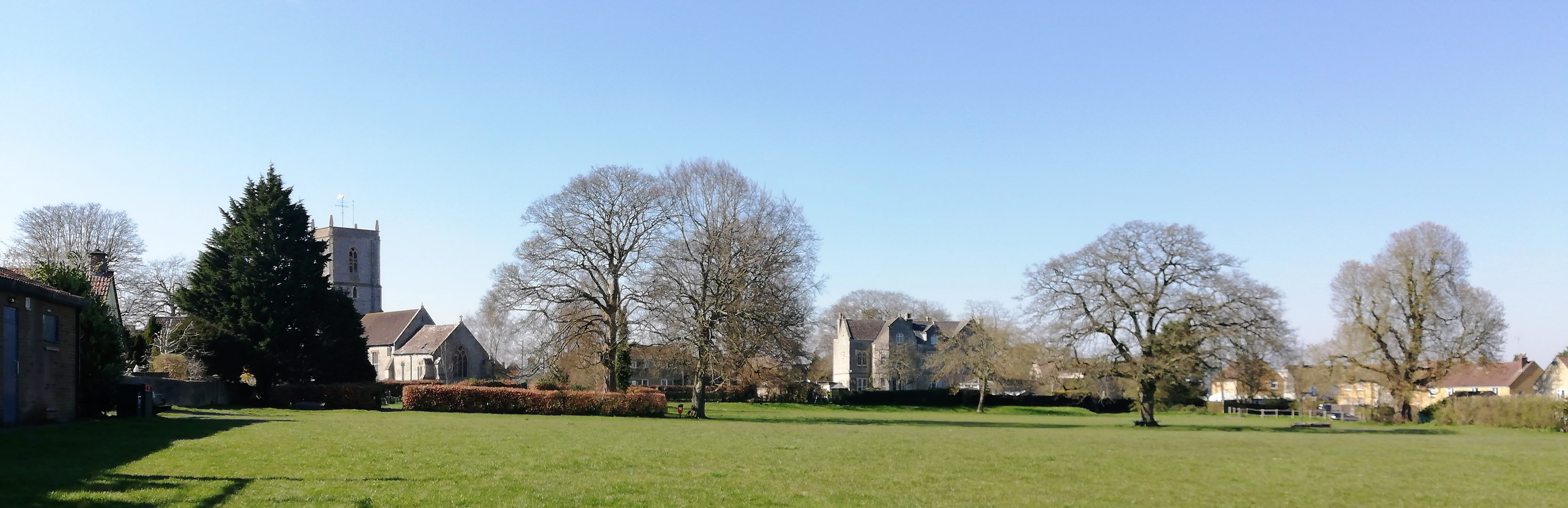
Pucklechurch Recreation Ground has been an open space for over 1000 years.

This is the main public open space, which may once have been a Saxon fortified enclosed area. The field was called "The Burrell" on the tithe map of 1843 and this name may be derived from the Saxon word 'burh'. The field is used by Pucklechurch Cricket Club as well as Pucklechurch Sports AFC and Pucklechurch Sports Ladies FC. Many events are hosted on it throughout the year, including "Pucklechurch Revel" day.

=== Education ===
By 1718 the village was endowed with a school for the education of 10 poor boys and 10 poor girls of the Parish, this being due to the charity of the Vicar the Revd. Henry Berrow, who was the first of several benefactors of Pucklechurch.

Pucklechurch CE VC Primary School provides primary education. The nearest secondary school provision is over 3 miles (5 km) away at Mangotsfield School Specialist College in Engineering and Science.

== Landmarks ==
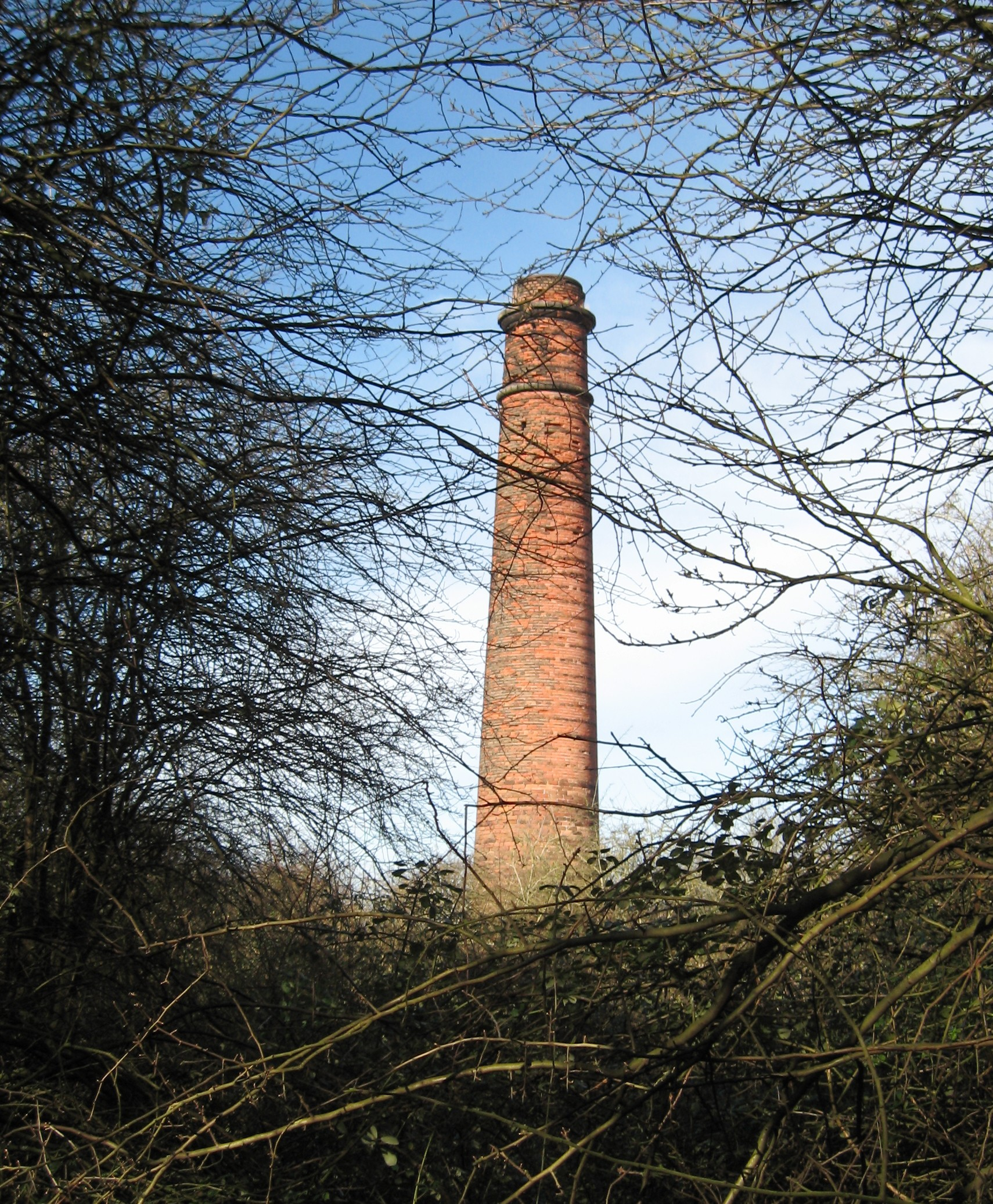
Parkfield Colliery chimney

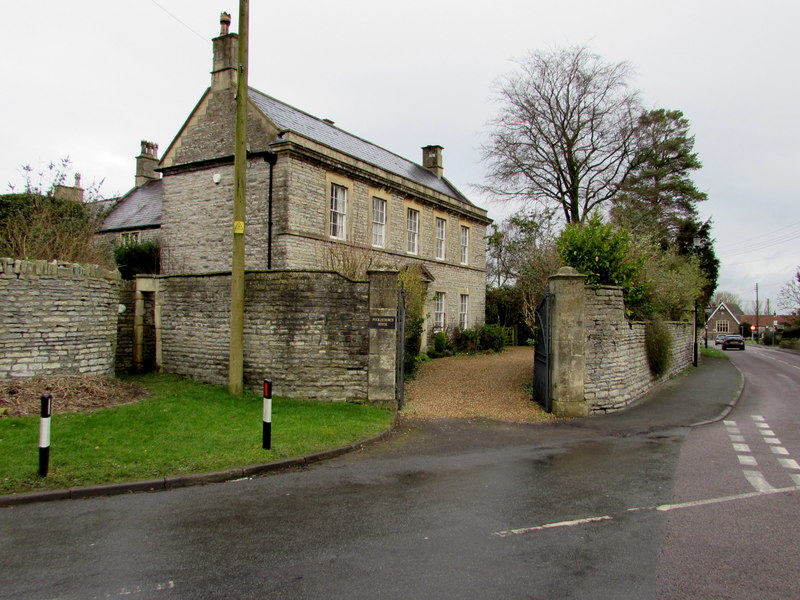
Grade II listed Pucklechurch House, Pucklechurch

Aside from scheduled monuments, there is an abundance of listed buildings, as well as the remains of industrial activity relating to coal mining and clay works. There are currently 44 listed buildings across the parish, including the grade I listed St. Thomas a Becket Church, as well as three scheduled monuments including the 19th century Brandy Bottom Colliery site, an important legacy of mining in the area. Nearby are the remains of Parkfield Colliery.

== Transport ==
=== Bus ===
The parish is poorly served by public transport services. There is no longer a direct bus service to Bristol city centre. Stagecoach West operates the 525 to Emersons Green and Yate on an hourly basis and the 620 to Old Sodbury and Bath. First West of England operates the SB6 at college term times to provide connections for students to St Brendan's Sixth Form College.

=== Roads and rail ===
The nearby primary roads include the Avon Ring Road (A4174) and the M4 which connects the area with other large settlements including Swindon, Reading and London. Bristol Parkway is the closest major railway station which offers routes to London, Cardiff, Birmingham, Glasgow and SW England. There are many roads and public rights of way that criss-cross the parish, including a national cycle route and the Community Forest Path. The M4 motorway is a significant feature but there is no direct access either to or from it. The B4465 runs from the Avon Ring Road (A4174) to the centre of the village of Pucklechurch and then turns north towards Westerleigh. The Abson Road runs south from the centre and provides access to the A420 at Wick. The Feltham Road runs eastwards through Dyrham and Hinton to the A46 and provides access to M4 J18.

=== Active travel ===
A shared use path runs alongside the B4465 road which links Pucklechurch to the A4174 and onward to Emersons Green. It was completed in June 2024.

== Demography ==
At the 2021 United Kingdom census, the population of the parish was 3,209 with a population density of 394.9/km².

Census population of Pucklechurch parish
Census	Population	Female	Male	Households	Source
2001	3,082	1,392	1,690	1,089	
2011	2,904	1,414	1,490	1,153	
2021	3,209	1,427	1,782	1,194	

== Twinning association ==
Pucklechurch is twinned with Pringy, Seine-et-Marne in France. The twinning association is no longer active but in the past organised reciprocal trips and short stays with a similar community group from Pringy.

== Localities ==
The parish accommodates two other small hamlets, separated from the main village by green buffers.

=== Shortwood ===
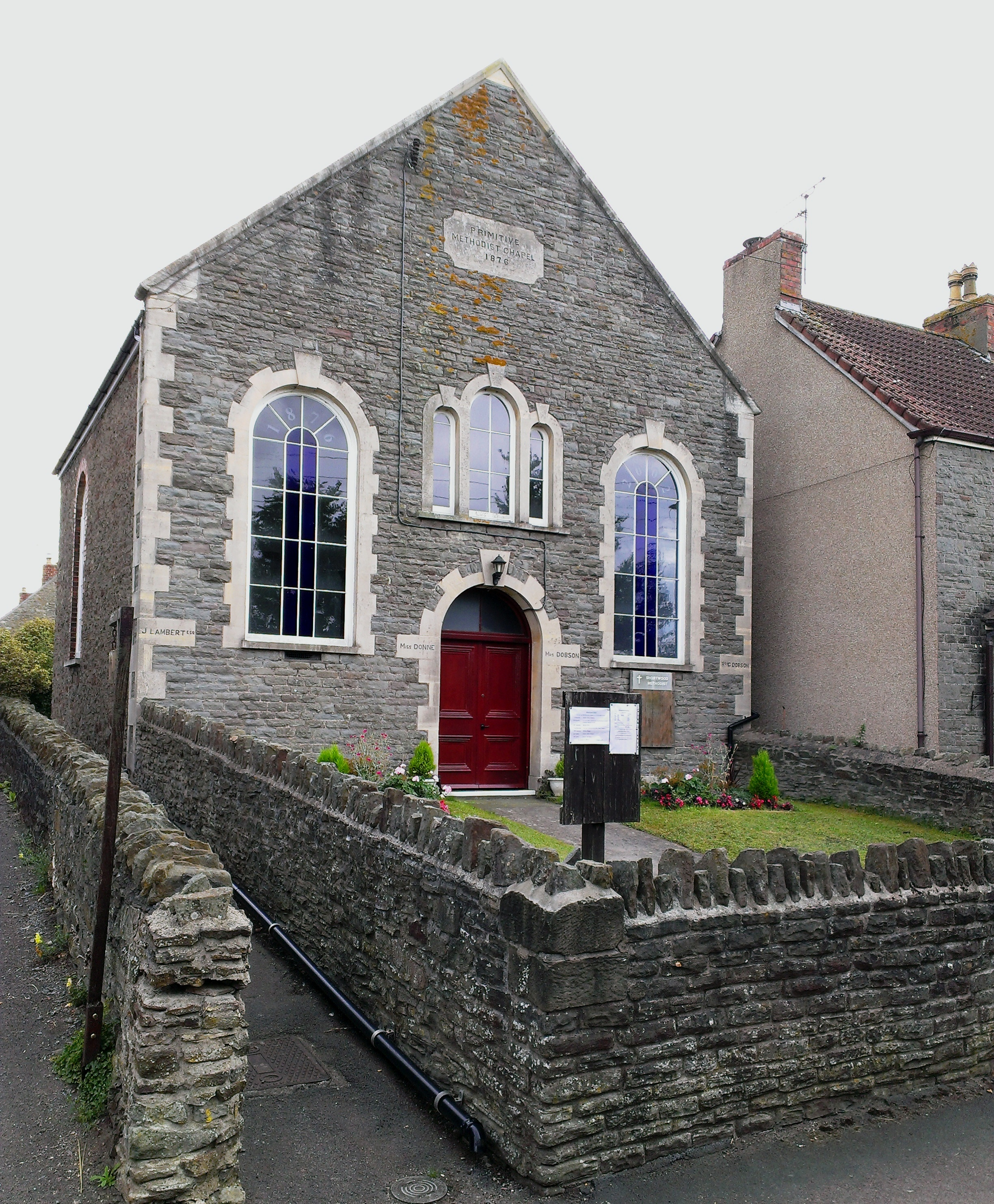
Shortwood Methodist Church

Shortwood is located to the east of the A4174 and to the west of Pucklechurch village, sitting lower in the landscape topography against the Pucklechurch ridge and adjacent to Emerson’s Green and Mangotsfield. It is largely a linear settlement (comprising approximately 73 households) washed over by the Green Belt. Map evidence suggests that many of the properties along the main road were constructed in the latter half of the 1800s. Shortwood has a Primitive Methodist Chapel dating to 1876 and a public house.

=== Parkfield ===
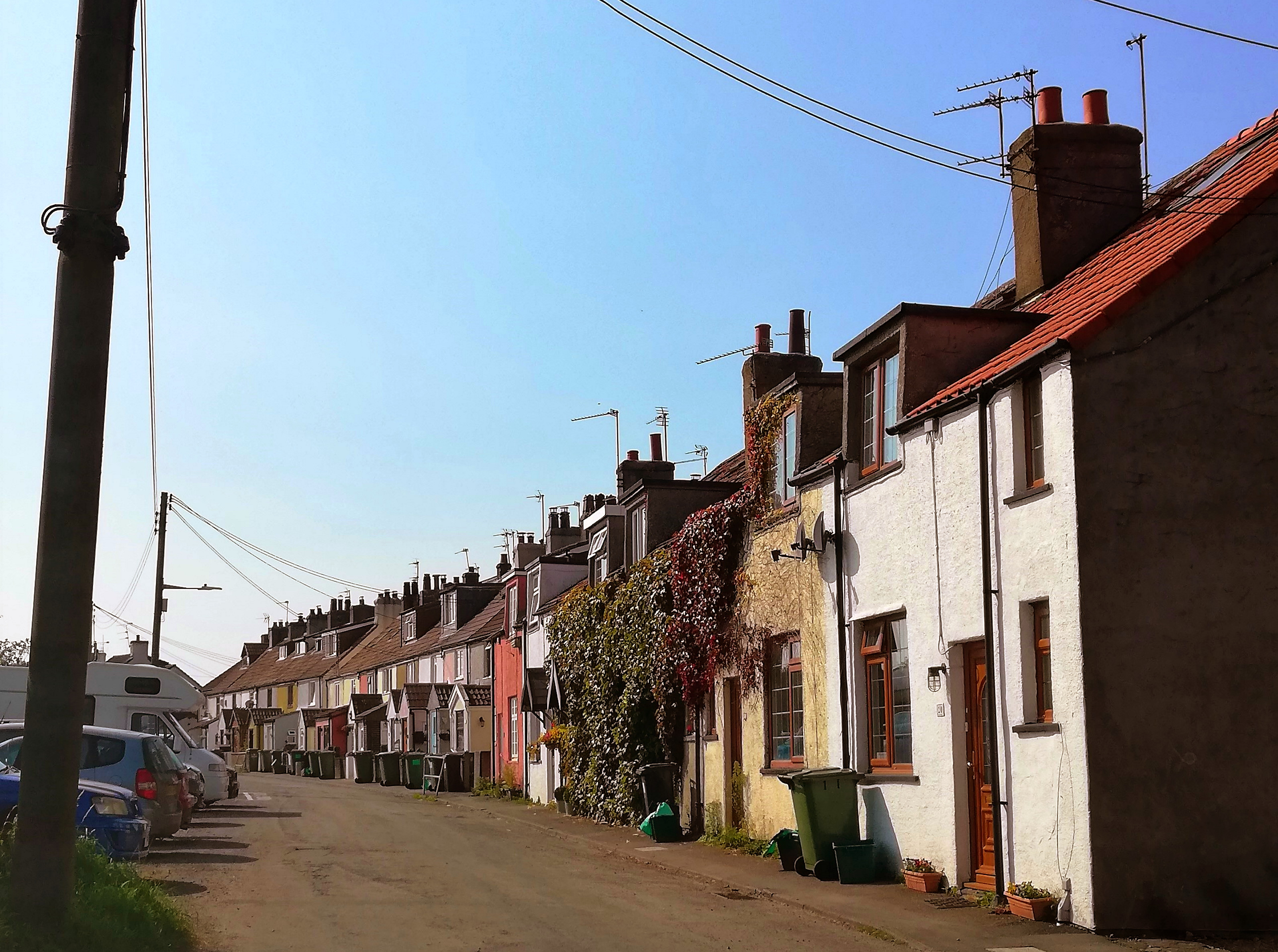
Cottages at Parkfield Rank

The settlement at Parkfield consists for the most part of a row of cottages built by Handel Cossham to house the workers of Parkfield Colliery in the later 1800s.
