= John Dennys =

Title page of first edition (1613)in the Bodleian, shelfmark 8vo.D 15 Art.

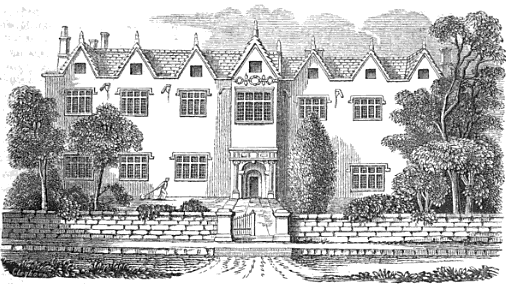
Court House at Pucklechurch, Gloucester

John Dennys (died 1609), a poet and fisherman, pioneered Angling poetry in England. His only work The Secrets of Angling was the earliest English poetical treatise on fishing. John Dennys may have been an acquaintance of Shakespeare.

== Early life ==
John Dennys was son of Hugh Dennis (died 1559) (Note: The information is to some extent based upon inscriptions on funerary monuments at St Thomas a Becket Church, however, it is not stated what monuments were viewed, nor the inscriptions of the monuments.) of "Plucherchurch" and Katherine, daughter of Thomas Trye of Hardwicke, Gloucestershire. (Note: In the article "One of the mysteries of angling literature", John's parents were reported on page 184 to be the son of Hugh and Katherine Trye Dennys by Rev. H.N. Ellacombe of Bitton. (Note: Ellacombe, Vicar of Bitton, was familiar with the history of the Dennis family of Pucklechurch, and wrote of John Dennys descendants who owned property in the 17th century.) Sir Harris Nicholas reported that he was the younger son of Sir Walter Dennys of Pucklechurch and Agnes Danvers or Davers, and The Secrets of Angling was written a century earlier than believed. Ellacombe claims that Sir Walter and Katherine were his great-grand parents. The author of the article claimed that Ellacombe had the correct genealogy of author John Dennis. The introductions of the 1883 and 1885 The Secrets of Angling editions state that it is believed that John's father was Hugh and his mother was Katherine Trye. Watkins, his biographer, said that Ellacombe's account was "correcting Sir Harris Nicolas's account".) (Note: According to the information attributed to Chitty and stated in his biography by Watkins, Hugh died in 1559. Chitty said he was the Sheriff of Gloucestershire in 1551. According to the Angler's article, Hugh died in 1609, as did his son John.) Hugh's father John had been the heir of Hugh Denys of Osterley, Middlesex (died 1511), Groom of the Stool to Henry VII. (Note: As heir, John's father established the "Dennis scholarship" for Magdalene College, Cambridge for monies originally intended by his uncle, Hugh, to be made to the Sheen Priory, which had been dissolved. The scholarship was established by procuring an Act of Parliament) John's elder brother Henry, died without having fathered any children.

== The Secrets of Angling ==
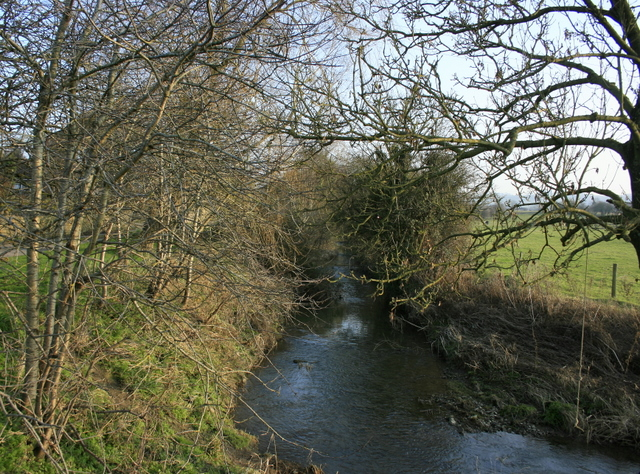
The River Boyd at Doynton

His only work The Secrets of Angling was the earliest English poetical treatise on fishing. (Note: Dame Julia Berners had written a brief prose treaty in the 2nd. ed. of the Book of St. Albans, 1496, but without apparent thought to style, "Treatyse on Fysshynge with an Angle". 3 or 4 other prose treatises appeared before 1613. See James Wilson's The Rod and the Gun. Edinburgh, 1844, p. 279. for a list of such early works.) In it he wrote of a brook, River Boyd, formed from streams in his hometown of Pucklechurch, which met downstream with the River Avon:

And thou, sweet Boyd, that with thy watry sway,
Dost wash the cliffs of Deignton and of Weeke;
And through their Rockes with crooked winding way,
Thy mother Avon runnest soft to seeke;
In whose fayre streames the speckled Trout doth play.

It was first published in 1613. Dennys's book was published after his death, the author identified by the initials J.D., and had been attributed to up to 6 poets. In 1811 the authorship was determined from Stationers' Registers, which showed that Dennys authored the book.

A didactic pastoral poem in 3 books, totalling 151 verses each of 8 lines, in the style of Virgil's Georgics, it was published in 4 editions until 1652, examples of which are amongst the rarest books in existence. Verses from the book have been quoted in other works, such as Izaak Walton in the first part of the first chapter of his 1653 edition of The Compleat Angler. (Note: Piscator to Venator: "Will you hear the wish of another angler, and the commendation of his happy life, which he also sings in verse; namely, Jo. Davors, Esq." (verses) "Sir, I am glad my memory has not lost these verses, because they are somewhat more pleasant and more suitable to May-day than my harsh discourse".)

Dennys received at the hand of Thomas Westwood (1814–1888), the epithet "The Fisherman's Glorious John". The appellation was received from Walter Scott.

== Marriage and children ==
He married Eleanor, daughter of Thomas Millett of Warwickshire (Note: The introduction to the 1883 The Secrets of Angling and his biographer stated that Katherine died in 1583. There was previously a statement that she died after 1618, but that info was not properly attributed.) and had the following children:

- Henry (born 1594), High Sheriff of Gloucestershire (1629), died on 26 June 1638 and may also have been buried the same day at Pucklechurch. (Note: 26 June 1638 date of death or burial comes from the inscription of his monument. Chitty said that Henry died in 1623.)
- William, born 1596 and baptised 18 April 1596 buried at Pucklechurch 1652.
- Cicely or Cecelia, born 1596 and baptised 18 April 1596, married William Guise, Esquire of Elmore and Sheriff of Gloucester in 1647.
- Katherine, born 1599 and baptised 9 April 1599

Between 1572 and 1608, he was the lord of the manor at Oldbury-sur-Montem, Pucklechurch, Gloucestershire. He had other places in the same county.

== Acquaintanceship with Shakespeare ==
Rev. Henry Nicholson Ellacombe wrote Shakespeare as an Angler, in which he argues that The Bard and John Dennys (Dennis) may have known each other. William Shakespeare lived for a while at Dursley, not too far from Dennys's manor of Oldbury-on-Hill, north of Pucklechurch.

== Death and epitaph ==
He died 30 July 1609 and was buried 7 August 1609 at the ancient Pucklechurch, (Note: The inscription for his son Henry's monument has caused errors in historical records of the Dennys family.) The family was buried in the Pucklechurch's "ancient" church on the north aisle. John Dennys's will was dated 1609, without month, proved 14th. Oct. 1609.

Thomas Westwood wrote the following epitaph for John Dennys:

Calm be his sleep in the old aisle of Pucklechurch! or if any sound reach him from the outer world, may it be only the soughing of the sweet south wind, and the ripple of Boyd, that with "crooked winding way" past cliff and meadow, "Its mother Avon runneth soft to seek".

== Sources ==
- Oxford Dictionary of National Biography.
