= Ellacombe apparatus =

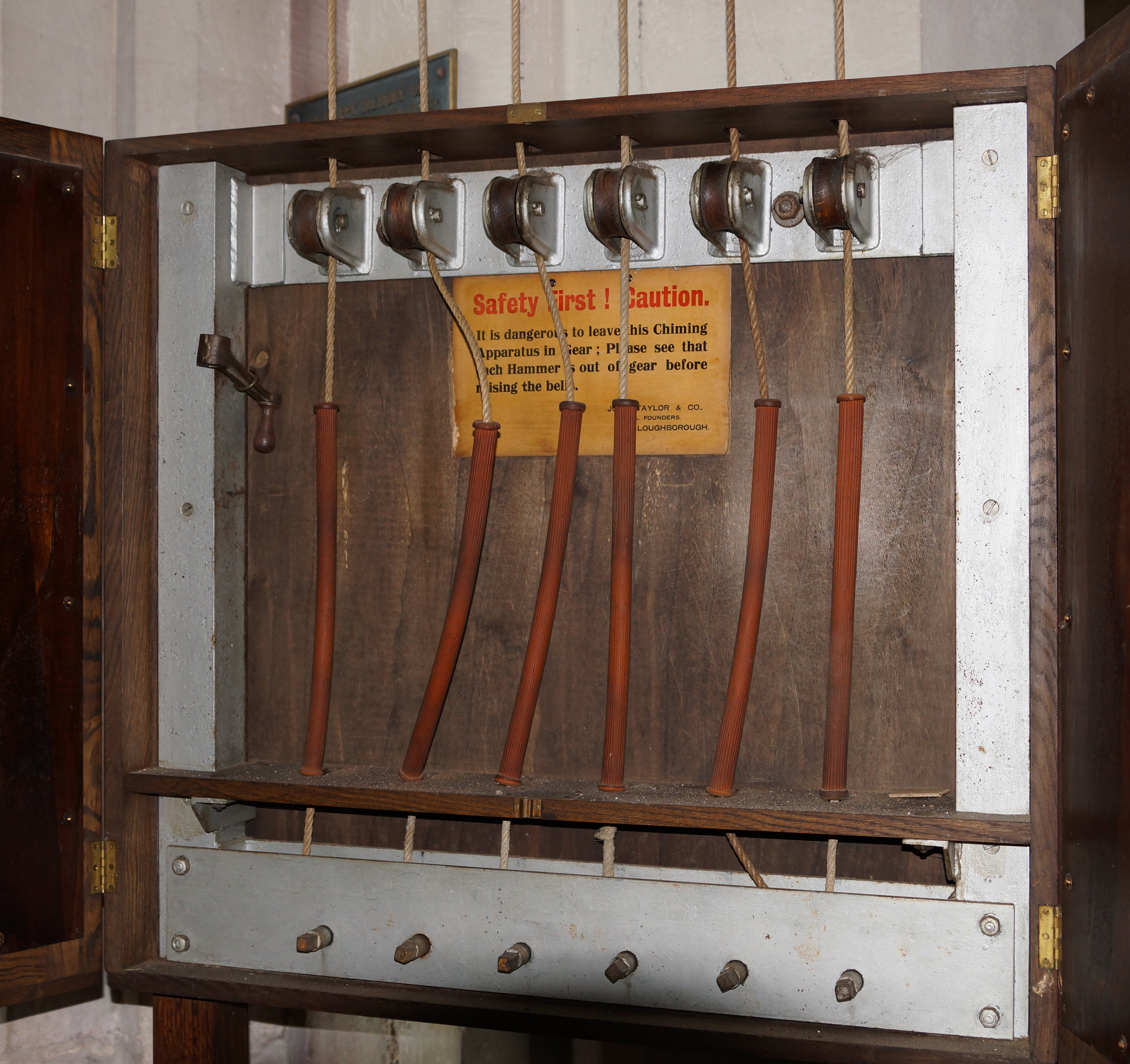
Ellacombe apparatus for six bells

The Ellacombe apparatus is a mechanism devised for performing change ringing on church bells by striking stationary bells with hammers. It does not produce the same sound as full circle ringing due to the absence of Doppler effect as the bells do not rotate, and the lack of a damping effect from the clapper after each strike.

== Operation ==
The apparatus can be operated by one person, unlike the traditional method, where the bells are rotated through over 360 degrees (full circle ringing) to sound them and one bell-ringer is needed for each bell. Instead the bells are kept static (or "hung dead") and a hammer is struck against the inside of the bell. Each hammer is connected by a rope to a fixed frame in the bell-ringing room. When in use the ropes are taut, and pulling one of the ropes towards the player will strike the hammer against the bell. To enable full circle ringing, the Ellacombe ropes can be slackened to allow the hammers to drop away from the moving bells.

The system was devised in 1821 by Reverend Henry Thomas Ellacombe of Gloucestershire, who first had such a system installed in Bitton in 1822. He created the system as an alternative to using his local ringers, so that he did not have to tolerate behaviour that he saw as unruly. The Revd Ellacombe was the editor of the bell-ringing column of a church periodical called "Church Bells", and was not slow to criticise the actions of bell ringers who did not ring exclusively for church services. A particular target was "prize ringing", where teams from different churches competed for a prize for the best ringing, usually accompanied by a social event. An example was in 1875 when he weighed in with a diatribe against a ringing competition at Slapton in Devon, when he wrote, "We blame the Vicar and churchwardens for allowing the bells to be so prostituted for the benefits of a publican's pocket...".

In practice, the apparatus required considerable expertise for one person to ring changes, which most churches did not have, and it alienated bell-ringers from the church. The sound of a chime was a poor substitute for the rich sound of swinging bells, and the apparatus fell out of fashion. Consequently, the apparatus was removed from many towers in the past, leaving holes in the ceiling and often frames without ropes.

In towers where the apparatus remains in working order it is often still used to play simple call change sequences, hymn tunes, or carols at Christmas. The apparatus is also used when insufficient full circle ringers are available, or where it is no longer safe to swing the bells. There are known be over 400 Ellacombe chimes in working order in the UK and at least 40 in the other parts of the world.

In the United Kingdom, during the COVID-19 pandemic, Ellacombe apparatuses were used in some churches (when local restrictions allowed) to sound church bells when gathering of large groups indoors was not permitted.

== See also ==
- Chime
- Carillon
