= Henry Nicholson Ellacombe =

British botanist (1822–1916)

Henry Nicholson Ellacombe (18 February 1822 – 7 February 1916) was a British plantsman, clergyman, and author on botany and gardening. He served as a vicar in Bitton and canon of Bristol. He wrote on the botany of Shakespeare.

== Life ==
Ellacombe, the son of Henry Thomas Ellacombe, was born at Bitton, Gloucestershire in 1822. He attended Bath Grammar School and Oriel College, Oxford, graduating in 1844. In 1847 he was ordained and spent a year as a curate at Sudbury, Derbyshire, before returning to Bitton as his father's curate. He received an MA in 1848. In 1850 he succeeded his father as vicar of Bitton. Two years later he married Emily Aprila Wemyss with whom he had ten children. A keen botanist and gardener, Ellacombe grew a wide range of plants at Bitton and exchanged plants and seeds with Kew and other botanical gardens across Europe. Sir Joseph Dalton Hooker dedicated volume 107 of the Botanical Magazine to him. In 1897 he was one of the first 60 recipients of the Victoria Medal of Honour.

He was involved in restoring Bitton Church and became rural dean of Bitton in 1874 and honorary canon of Bristol in 1881. A lychgate was erected in his honor in Bitton Church in 1931.

== Works ==
The Plant-Lore & Garden-Craft of Shakespeare (1878) – After a short introduction, in a section titled Plant Lore of Shakespeare Rev. Ellacombe alphabetically lists plants referenced in Shakespeare's plays. Each notation begins with a quote using the plant, and the play, act and scene. If there is more than one reference he lists them all; Roses, for example, have 65 quotes from numerous plays. For each plant, he then gives specific information about the family, uses and distribution. At times he quotes the use of the plant by other authors, such as Chaucer, Spenser and Ben Jonson. The Appendices are on "The Daisy", "The Seasons of Shakespeare's Plays", and the "Names of Plants", which lists various names of a plant by various authors.

Other works:

- Shakespeare as an Angler (1883)
- In a Gloucestershire Garden (1895)
- In My Vicarage Garden, and Elsewhere (1902)
