= Henry Thomas Ellacombe =

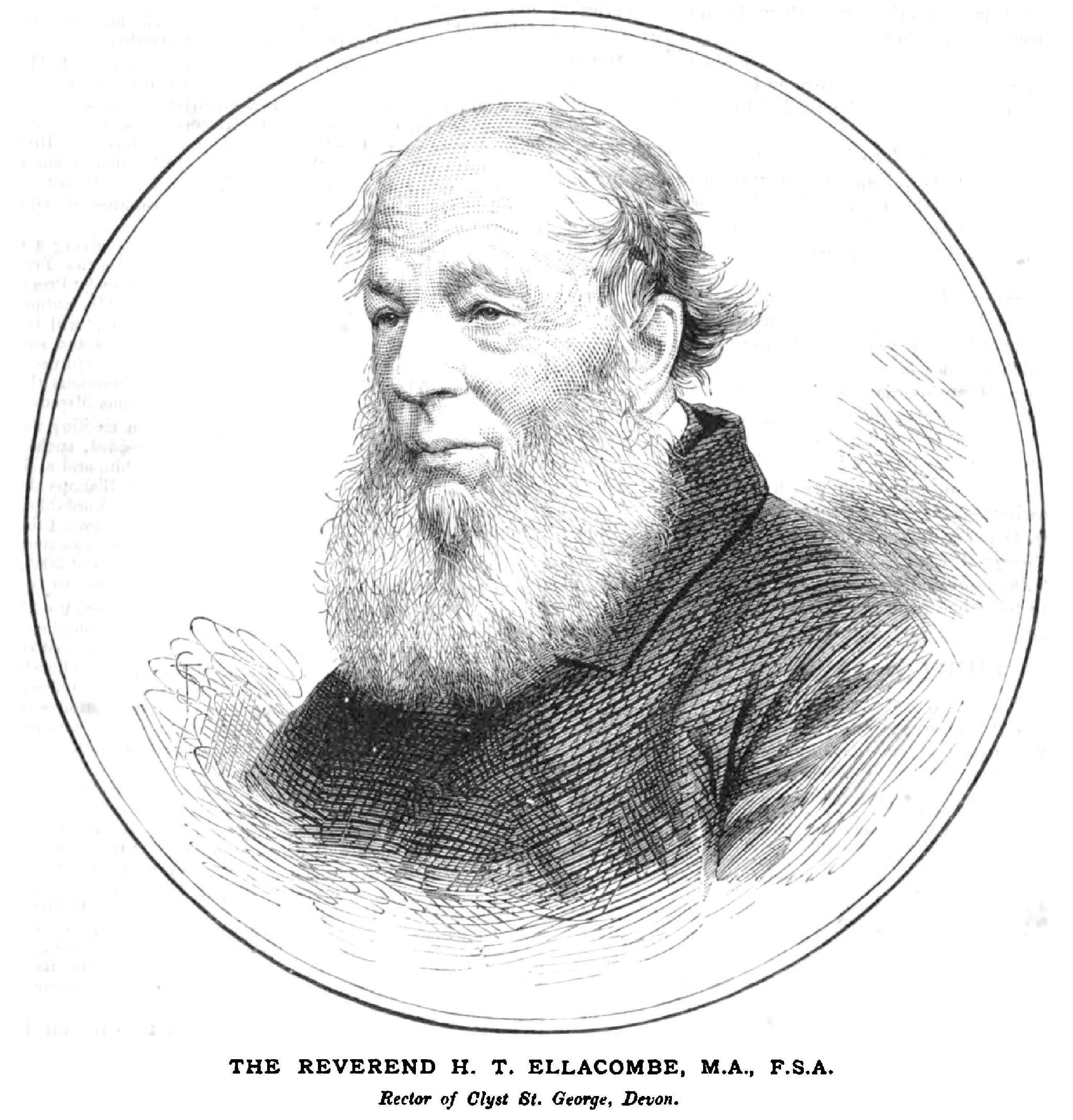
Henry Thomas Ellacombe

Henry Thomas Ellacombe or Ellicombe (1790–1885), was an English divine and antiquary. He was the inventor of an apparatus to allow a single ringer to ring multiple bells.

== Life ==
Ellacombe was born in 1790, the son of the Rev. William Ellicombe, rector of Alphington, Devon. Having graduated B.A. from Oriel College, Oxford in 1812, he applied himself until 1816 to the study of engineering in Chatham Dockyard under the direction of Marc Brunel. In 1816 he proceeded to the degree of M.A. and was ordained for the curacy of Cricklade, Wiltshire in the diocese of Gloucester. The next year, having been ordained as a priest, he moved to Bitton, Gloucestershire, in the same diocese. He held the curacy there until 1835, when he became the vicar of the parish. In 1850 he was presented to the rectory of Clyst St George, Devon, being succeeded in his former benefice by his son, Henry Nicholson Ellacombe (1822–1916), who became a distinguished gardening writer and mentor to the great plantsman E.A. Bowles.

Ellacombe died at Clyst St. George on 30 July 1885, and was buried in the churchyard of Bitton.

== Personal papers ==
Bristol Archives holds 17 volumes of manuscripts, newspaper extracts, transcripts, antiquarian memoranda, drawings and correspondence mainly relating to the ancient parish of Bitton, to the east of Bristol, brought together by Reverend Ellacombe, (Ref. 44786) (online catalogue). Records relating to Henry Thomas Ellacombe can also be found at the British Library Manuscript Collections, Bristol Reference Library, Bodleian Library and Newcastle University Library.

== Works ==
In spite of many difficulties, Ellacombe restored the church of Bitton in 1822, and built three other churches in the wide district under his care, including Christ Church, Hanham, which was constructed under his immediate supervision. In 1843 his parishioners presented him with a testimonial, in which the churchwardens stated that he had been the means of providing church accommodation in the district for 2,285 worshippers, and schoolrooms for 820 children. After his removal to Clyst St. George he rebuilt the nave of the church there, and in 1860 erected a school-house and master's residence.

He was a learned antiquary, and a skilful florist and botanist.

== Bells ==
Ellacombe was a great authority on bells, and wrote many books and papers, including Practical Remarks on Belfries and Ringers, The Church Bells of Devon and The Church Bells of Somerset. Together with C. A. W. Troyte and William Banister, he was a leading figure in the formation of the Guild of Devonshire Ringers in 1874.

He invented a device, now known as an Ellacombe apparatus, with chiming hammers, to enable one person to chime all the bells in a tower. In practice, it required considerable and rare expertise for one person to ring changes on several bells, and the apparatus fell out of fashion. Consequently, the Ellacombe apparatus has been removed from many towers in the UK, but there are still often holes in the ceiling which the ropes would come through into the ringing chamber, and often the frames are still in the ringing chamber, without ropes. In towers where the apparatus remains intact, it is generally used like a carillon, to play simple tunes.

== Writings ==
His chief writings are:

- Practical Remarks on Belfries and Ringers Bristol, 1850, 4th edit. 1876.
- The Bells of the Church London, 1862
- History and Antiquities of the Parish of Clyst St. George, Exeter, 1865.
- Memoir of the Manor of Bitton, 1867.
- Church Bells of Devon, with a List of those in Cornwall and a Supplement, Exeter, 1872.
- Church Bells of Somerset, Exeter. 1875.
- The Voice of the Church Bells, Exeter, 1875
- Church Bells of Gloucestershire, Exeter, 1881.
- History and Antiquities of the Parish of Bitton, 2 parts, Exeter, 1881–3.

These works were privately printed.
