= List of schools in South Gloucestershire =

This is a list of schools in South Gloucestershire, England.

== State-funded schools ==
=== Primary schools ===
- Abbotswood Primary School, Yate
- Alexander Hosea Primary School, Wickwar
- Almondsbury CE Primary School, Almondsbury
- Bailey's Court Primary School, Bradley Stoke
- Barley Close Community Primary School, Mangotsfield
- Barrs Court Primary School, Barrs Court
- Beacon Rise Primary School, Kingswood
- Blackhorse Primary School, Emersons Green
- Bowsland Green Primary School, Bradley Stoke
- Bradley Stoke Community School, Bradley Stoke
- Broadway Infant School, Yate
- Bromley Heath Infant School, Downend
- Bromley Heath Junior School, Downend
- Cadbury Heath Primary School, Warmley
- Callicroft Primary School, Patchway
- Charborough Road Primary School, Filton
- Charfield Primary School, Charfield
- Charlton Wood Primary Academy, Patchway
- Cherry Garden Primary School, Bitton
- Christ Church Hanham CE Primary School, Hanham
- Christ Church CE Infant School, Downend
- Christ Church CE Junior School, Downend
- Christ The King RC Primary School, Thornbury
- Coniston Primary School, Patchway
- Courtney Primary School, Kingswood
- Crossways Infant School, Thornbury
- Crossways Junior School, Thornbury
- Elm Park Primary School, Winterbourne
- Emersons Green Primary School, Emersons Green
- Filton Hill Primary School, Filton
- Frampton Cotterell CE Primary School, Frampton Cotterell
- Frenchay CE Primary School, Frenchay
- Gillingstool Primary School, Thornbury
- Hambrook Primary School, Hambrook
- Hanham Abbots Junior School, Hanham
- Hawkesbury CE Primary School, Hawkesbury Upton
- Holy Family RC Primary School, Patchway
- Holy Trinity Primary School, Bradley Stoke
- Horton CE Primary School, Horton
- Iron Acton CE Primary School, Iron Acton
- Kings' Forest Primary School, Kingswood
- King's Oak Academy, Kingswood
- Little Stoke Primary School, Little Stoke
- Longwell Green Primary School, Longwell Green
- Lyde Green Primary School, Emersons Green
- Mangotsfield CE Primary School, Mangotsfield
- The Manor CE Primary School, Coalpit Heath
- Manorbrook Primary School, Thornbury
- Marshfield CE Primary School, Marshfield
- Meadowbrook Primary School, Bradley Stoke
- The Meadows Primary School, Bitton
- North Road Community Primary School, Yate
- Old Sodbury CE Primary School, Old Sodbury
- Oldbury on Severn CE Primary School, Oldbury-on-Severn
- Olveston CE Primary School, Olveston
- Our Lady of Lourdes RC Primary School, Kingswood
- The Park Primary School, Kingswood
- Parkwall Primary School, Cadbury Heath
- Pucklechurch CE Primary School, Pucklechurch
- Rangeworthy CE Primary School, Rangeworthy
- Raysfield Primary School, Chipping Sodbury
- Redfield Edge Primary School, Oldland Common
- The Ridge Junior School, Yate
- St Andrew's CE Primary School, Cromhall
- St Anne's CE Primary School, Oldland Common
- St Augustine of Canterbury RC Primary School, Downend
- St Barnabas CE Primary School, Warmley
- St Chad's Patchway CE Primary School, Patchway
- St Helen's CE Primary School, Alveston
- St John's Mead CE Primary School, Chipping Sodbury
- St Mary's CE Primary School, Thornbury
- St Mary's CE Primary School, Yate
- St Mary's RC Primary School, Bradley Stoke
- St Michael's CE Primary School, Stoke Gifford
- St Michael's CE Primary School, Winterbourne
- St Paul's RC Primary School, Yate
- St Peter's CE/Methodist Primary, Pilning
- St Stephen's CE Junior School, Soundwell
- St Stephen's Infant School, Soundwell
- Samuel White's Infant School, Hanham
- Severn Beach Primary School, Severn Beach
- Shields Road Primary School, Northville
- Stanbridge Primary School, Downend
- Staple Hill Primary School, Staple Hill
- Stoke Lodge Primary School, Patchway
- Tortworth Primary School, Tortworth
- Trinity CE Primary School, Acton Turville
- Tyndale Primary School, Yate
- The Tynings Primary School, Staple Hill
- Wallscourt Farm Academy, Stoke Gifford
- Watermore Primary School, Frampton Cotterel
- Wellesley Primary School, Yate
- Wheatfield Primary School, Bradley Stoke
- Wick CE Primary School, Wick
- Woodlands Primary School, Yate

=== Secondary schools ===
- Abbeywood Community School, Stoke Gifford
- Bradley Stoke Community School, Bradley Stoke
- Brimsham Green School, Yate
- The Castle School, Thornbury
- Chipping Sodbury School, Chipping Sodbury
- Digitech Studio School, Warmley
- Downend School, Downend
- Hanham Woods Academy, Hanham
- John Cabot Academy, Kingswood
- King's Oak Academy, Kingswood
- Mangotsfield School, Mangotsfield
- Marlwood School, Alveston
- Patchway Community School, Almondsbury
- Sir Bernard Lovell Academy, Oldland Common
- Winterbourne Academy, Winterbourne
- Yate Academy, Yate

=== Special and alternative schools ===
- Culverhill School, Yate
- New Horizons Learning Centre, Kingswood
- New Siblands School, Thornbury
- Pathways Learning Centre, Downend
- SGS Pegasus School, Patchway
- Two Bridges Academy, Alveston
- Warmley Park School, Warmley

=== Further education ===
- South Gloucestershire and Stroud College

== Independent schools ==
=== Primary and preparatory schools ===
- Tockington Manor School, Tockington

=== Senior and all-through schools ===
- Immanuel Christian School, Westerleigh

=== Special and alternative schools ===
- Aurora Hedgeway School, Pilning
- Neptune School, Warmley
- Castlefell School, Rudgeway
