= Northwick =

Northwick may refer to the following places in England:

- Northwick, a hamlet near Blockley, Gloucestershire (formerly in Worcestershire), now the site of Northwick Park, Gloucestershire
- Northwick, South Gloucestershire, a hamlet near Pilning in South Gloucestershire
- Northwick, Worcestershire, a village near Worcester
- Northwick Park, a district of Greater London
  - Northwick Park Hospital
  - Northwick Park tube station, a London Underground station

== See also ==
- Northwich, Cheshire, England
