= Langley and Swinehead Hundred =

Hundred of Gloucestershire, England

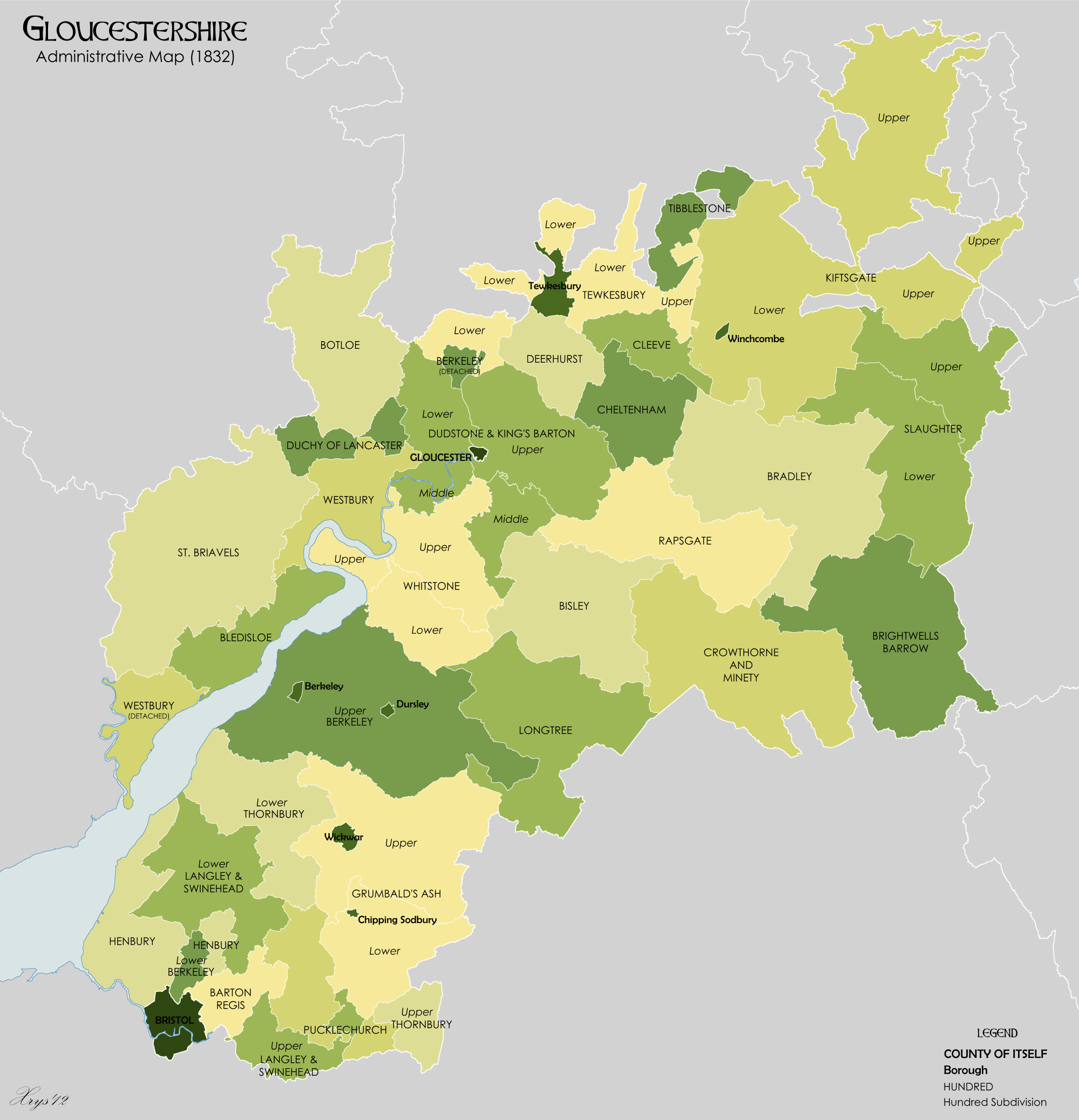
Gloucestershire Hundreds in 1832

Langley and Swinehead was an ancient hundred of Gloucestershire, England. Hundreds originated in the late Saxon period as a subdivision of a county and lasted as administrative divisions until the 19th century.

Langley and Swinehead was divided into two divisions — Upper and Lower — the Upper division comprised the four ancient parishes of Bitton, Doynton, Frampton-Cotterell and Winterbourne and part of the parish of Alveston. The Lower division comprised the three ancient parishes of Littleton-upon-Severn, Olveston and Rockhampton, the remainder of Alveston and part of the parish of Almondsbury.

At the time of the Domesday Book Langley and Swineshead were listed as two separate hundreds; Langley also included the parish of Thornbury — later a hundred of its own — and Swineshead included both the city of Bristol and what later became the Barton Regis Hundred.

Langley Hundred, on the west, comprised places within seven parishes:

- Alveston
- Frampton Cotterell
- Littleton-upon-Severn
- Olveston
- Rockhampton
- Thornbury
- Almondsbury - Gaunts Earthcott and Tockington

Swineshead, on the east, comprised places within Bristol (Bristol and Blacksworth), the later Barton Regis Hundred (Barton, Clifton, Mangotsfield and Ridgeway) and four other parishes:

- Bitton - Bitton, Oldland and Hanham
- Winterbourne - Winterbourne, Hambrook and Sturden
- Stoke Gifford (later in Henbury Hundred)
- Wapley (later in Grumbold's Ash Hundred)

Doynton was part of Pucklechurch Hundred at the time of the Domesday Book.

The name Langley is derived from lang lēah (long clearing), the place believed to be in Alveston parish where the hundred court met. 'Swineshead' came from swīn hēafod (pigs hill), a place near Swineford, Bitton parish where that hundred court met.

It's unclear when the hundreds of Langley and Swineshead were combined: the hundreds were still listed separately in 1395 and the combined hundred was reported from, at the latest, 1602.
