= Downend School =

Secondary Academy, South Gloucestershire

Location
- Westerleigh Road; Downend, South Gloucestershire, BS16 6XA; England; 51°29′32″N 2°29′36″W

Information
- Type: Academy
- Motto: Their motto is the acronym PRIDE which stands for: Participation Respect Identity Determination Excellence
- Established: 2013
- Local authority: South Gloucestershire
- Trust: Pathway trust
- Department for Education URN: 139345 Tables
- Ofsted: Reports
- Head teacher: Mrs Rachael Corns
- Gender: Mixed
- Age: 11 to 18
- Enrollment: 1415 (from September 2026)
- Capacity: 1425
- Website: www.downend.com

Downend School is a coeducational secondary school with a sixth form that has academy status. It is part of Pathway Trust.

== Houses ==
The school has four houses: Carpenter (green), Brunel (red), Grace (blue) and Muller (yellow), each named after a different person from Bristol. Students are sorted into these houses somewhat at random, though allowance is made for siblings and friendships. There is a teacher who is the head each house.

== Uniforms ==
The house is shown via the tie that each student wears, which has three stripes repeating down it, one thin white stripe, one thick navy stripe, and one medium stripe, in the house colour. The school logo also appears on the tie (a shield with small images representing the houses).

In addition to the tie, the uniform consists of a navy blazer and the school logo situated in a pocket on the left. A white shirt is worn, along with dark grey tailored trousers and black leather shoes. There is also the option of wearing a dark grey skirt instead of trousers.

== Policies ==
=== Yondr Pouches ===
At end of School year 2025-2026 to start of school year 2026-2027 the use of mobile phones by students on site is banned. All students are issued with yondr pouches to lock their phone away whilst keeping it with them. If they are spotted with their phone outside pouch it will be confiscated with their parents having to pick it up and they will get a detention for first offence.

=== Class charts ===
The school uses a software called class charts which allows the teachers to log behaviour. Certain action earn positives like for putting hand up to answer question or a negative like for talking over teacher. This gets logged on the system which the parents can see and tallies up their scores. The students gets rewarded for reaching a certain number of positives. It goes: 100 positives - Bronze badge, 150 positives - Silver badge, 200 positives - Gold badge, 250 positives - platinum badge. At certain levels of negatives disciplinary action is taken.

=== Extracurricular activities ===
==== DOFE ====
Downend is a DOFE registered school which mostly runs Bronze and Silver.They use the company BXM Outdoors to run the expeditions.

== History ==
=== Page School for Girls ===
Staple Hill Senior School for Girls was established in 1933 and 1947 became Staple Hill Secondary Modern School, with separate departments for boys and girls. After the Chase Comprehensive School was built for the boys in about 1966, the girls stayed in the buildings in North View, and it was renamed Page School for Girls.

=== Establishment ===
In September 1982, Page School for Girls merged with the coeducational Stockwell Hill Comprehensive School, becoming Downend Comprehensive School.

=== 2000s ===
It was renamed Downend Community School. In 2005, it moved to Westerleigh Road. Tamryn Savage became head teacher in 2006 and onwards after acting head Ray Lockey retired. She left at the end of the academic year 2010-2011 and was replaced by Will Roberts. The buildings of Page School for Girls were demolished from 2007 to 2008.

The school converted to academy status on 1 March 2013.

== Sixth Form ==
Downend and Mangotsfield share a sixth form, located in the Downend School premises.

The logo of this sixth Form is a 6 made up of various green shapes, including squares and a smaller 6.

For the typical Year 12 cohort (based on averages from 2020–2022), 78% of students are from Downend, 17% from Mangotsfield, and 5% from other areas.

== Notable former pupils ==
- Mike Bailey, best known for playing the role of Sid Jenkins on Skins (TV series)
- Sajid Javid, Conservative MP for Bromsgrove, formerly Secretary of State for Health and Social Care and Chancellor of the Exchequer
- Chris Mason, former professional darts player
