= Gaunt's Earthcott =

Hamlet in Gloucestershire, England

Coordinates: 51.555°N 2.523°W

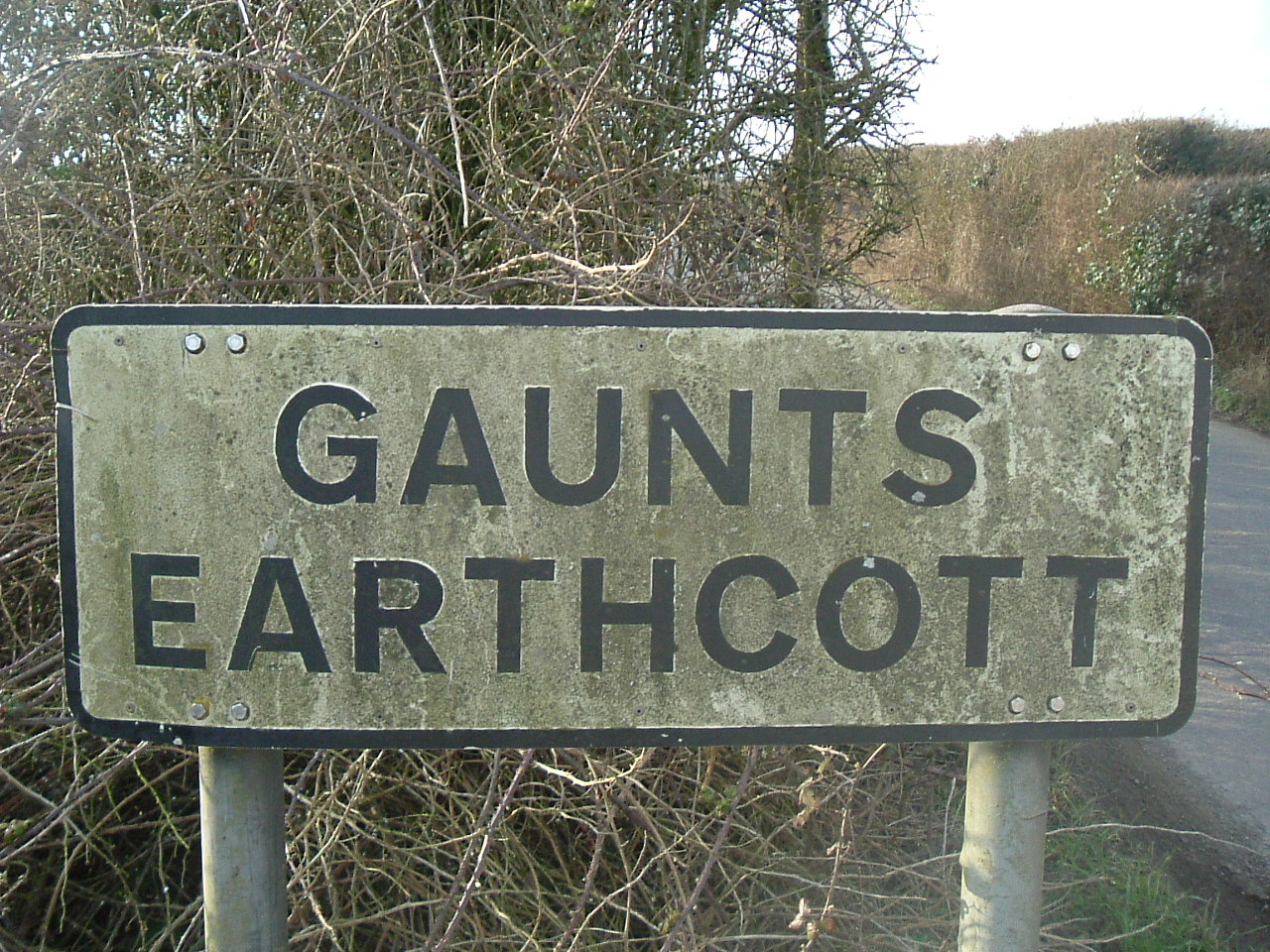
Village sign in March 2006

Gaunt's Earthcott, sometimes spelt Gaunts Earthcott, is a hamlet in the civil parish of Almondsbury in South Gloucestershire, England.

== Geography ==
It is located approximately 2.5 miles (4 km) from Rudgeway and the A38 road and about the same distance from Frampton Cotterell and Winterbourne. The village is located close to the interchange between the M4 and M5 motorways.

Gaunt's Earthcott should not be confused with Earthcott, a couple of miles away on the B4059 road between the A38 and Yate.

== Amenities ==
Gaunt'e Earthcott consists of a ruined chapel, a few houses and two farms, Green Farm and Court Farm. There is no real industry as such and the main economic activity in the area is farming.
