= 1848 English cricket season =

Cricket season review

The 1848 English cricket season was the 22nd of the roundarm era. (Note: Any match listed in the ACS' Important Match Guide (1981) is historically important, and therefore of the highest standard, whether or not a scorecard might exist. The same applies to numerous matches discovered by researchers since 1981. For further information, see First-class cricket.) There was an increase in northern matches with the main town clubs regularly challenging each other. The last single wicket event was held.

== Important matches ==
- 1848 match list

== Events ==
18 July. Birth of W. G. Grace at Downend, near Bristol.

Sheffield Cricket Club played home and away against both Manchester Cricket Club and Nottingham Cricket Club.

== Leading batsmen ==
George Parr was the leading runscorer with 339 @ 18.83.

Other leading batsmen were N Felix, A Mynn, WJ Hammersley, T Box, JM Lee, J Wisden, RT King, J Dean.

== Leading bowlers ==
WR Hillyer was the leading wicket-taker with 85.

Other leading bowlers were FW Lillywhite, J Wisden, A Mynn, W Clarke, E Hinkly, GE Yonge, JM Lee.

== Bibliography ==
- ACS (1981). A Guide to Important Cricket Matches Played in the British Isles 1709–1863. Nottingham: ACS. OCLC 85045528.
- Warner, Pelham (1946). Lords: 1787–1945. London: Harrap. OCLC 877106024.
