= The Grange School and Sports College =

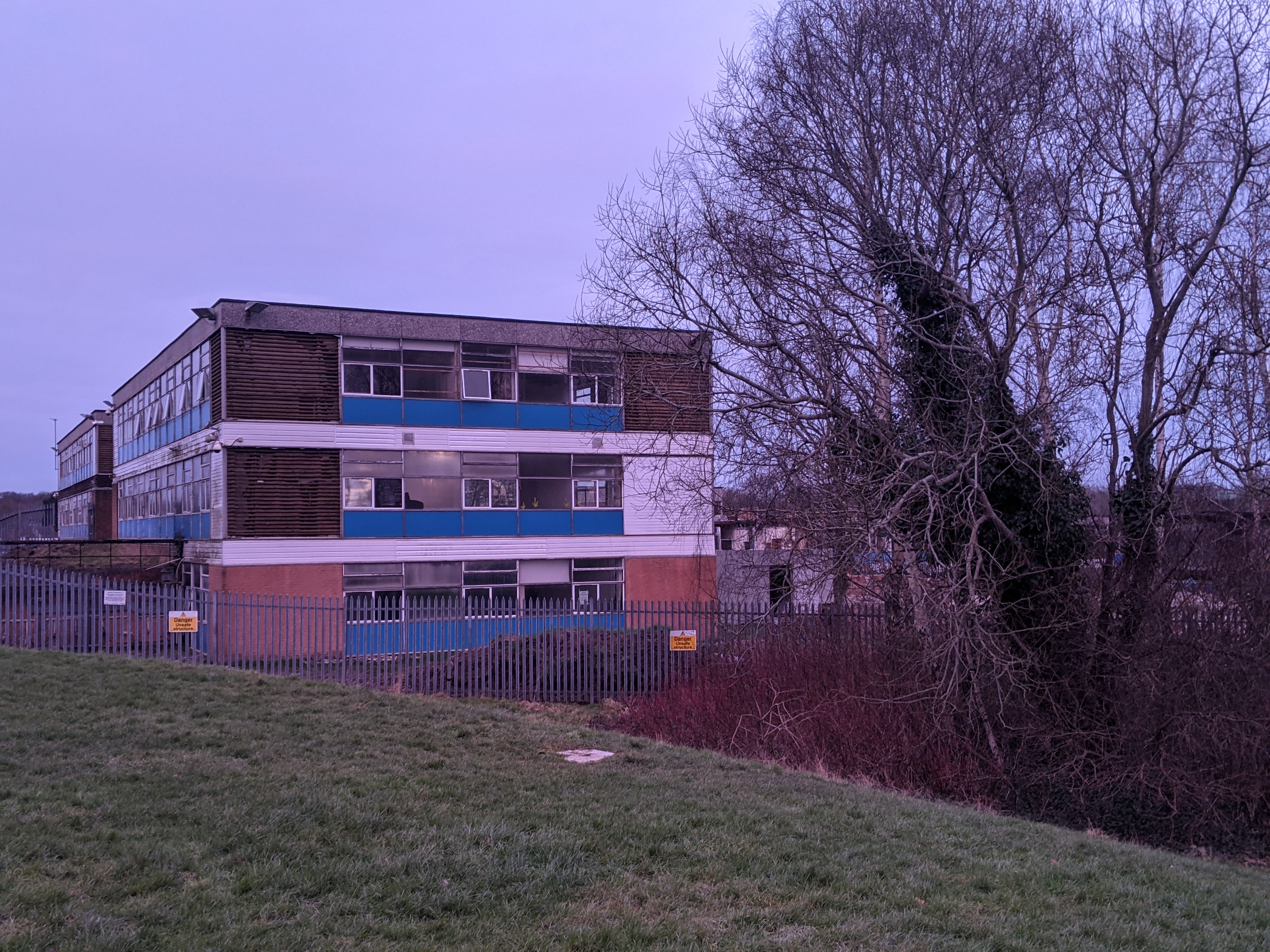
- Main building after closure

Location
- Tower Road North; Warmley, Gloucestershire, BS30 8XQ; England
- Coordinates: 51.457°N 2.480°W

Information
- Other name: The Grange
- Type: Community school
- Motto: Handing on academic and sporting excellence
- Closed: 2016
- Local authority: South Gloucestershire Council
- Specialist: Sports College
- Department for Education URN: 109322 Tables
- Ofsted: Reports
- Head teacher: Timothy Byford
- Gender: Mixed
- Age range: 11–18
- Capacity: 1,317
- Website: www.thegrangeschool.net

The Grange School and Sports College (simply referred to as The Grange) was an 11–18 mixed, community secondary school and sixth form in Warmley, Gloucestershire, England. It closed in 2016.

== History ==
=== Closure ===
In January 2014, South Gloucestershire Council was consulting parents on ceasing admissions to new students from September 2015 and closing it on 31 August 2016. The school was placed into special measures following its Ofsted inspection in April 2013 where it was criticised for "not offering an acceptable standard of education". As a result, various options were explored including amalgamating it with a neighbouring school and sponsorship as a stand-alone academy but was ruled out following "extensive discussion and consultation". It was hoping to bid for funding for a studio school on the site that would open in September 2015.

The school also faced financial challenges due to falling rolls and its ageing buildings that were in poor condition. Year Seven and Eight students would be transferred to new schools while those studying for GCSEs would complete their studies at the school. Its future would be finalised by June 2014 however in April 2014, the consultation was paused based on legal advice and its closure delayed by a year. No decisions on its future were made until the consultation had closed and a new consultation would be launched over the coming months.

South Gloucestershire Council’s Children & Young People Committee voted to close the school in December 2014 despite pleas from parents, pupils and teachers to keep it open. This paves the way for a studio school, which will be known as Digitech Studio School, to open in September 2015 in a refurbished block on the site that was earmarked for the school. It would be run by the Cabot Learning Federation with a proposed £4 million new building that would be built on the site and students were being invited to apply for places. The Department for Education said the closure of the school was a precondition for the studio school opening.

A statutory notice was published in January 2015 to give the public a last chance to comment with the final decision being made in March 2015. The school also had a surplus of around 600 places and repair works totalling more than £10 million. The Digitech Studio School opened as planned and The Grange closed a year earlier than expected, at the end of the 2016 school year following an announcement in February 2016.

==== Future ====
In March 2018, it was announced that South Gloucestershire Council will be undertaking a masterplan exercise to shape the future of the site with a first draft later in the year, which will set out a range of options for the local people, before a further round of consultation by early 2019. As there is a shortage of school places in the Warmley and Kingswood areas, the school site was identified as a possible location for a new primary school. The council was also in discussions with Homes England at developing affordable housing in the area but were "open to other alternative developments".
