= Redwick =

Redwick could refer to:

- Redwick, Gloucestershire, a village in England
- Redwick, Newport, a village in south east Wales
