= Latteridge =

Hamlet in Gloucestershire, England

Coordinates: 51.561°N 2.483°W

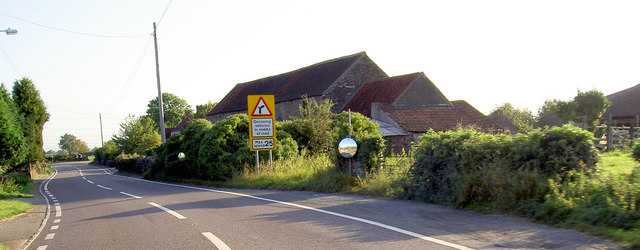

- Location within Gloucestershire
- Population: under 100
- OS grid reference: ST666847
- Civil parish: Iron Acton
- Unitary authority: South Gloucestershire
- Ceremonial county: Gloucestershire
- Region: South West
- Country: England
- Sovereign state: United Kingdom
- Post town: Bristol
- Postcode district: BS37
- Dialling code: 01454
- Police: Avon and Somerset
- Fire: Avon
- Ambulance: South Western
- UK Parliament: Thornbury and Yate

Latteridge is a hamlet in South Gloucestershire, England. It lies on the B4059 road north of Iron Acton, and south of Rudgeway and Earthcott. The hamlet is divided by the B4059, there is a large village green, a railway crossing, a large duck pond and a ruined church.
