= Littleton-upon-Severn =

Coordinates: 51.6077°N 2.5851°W

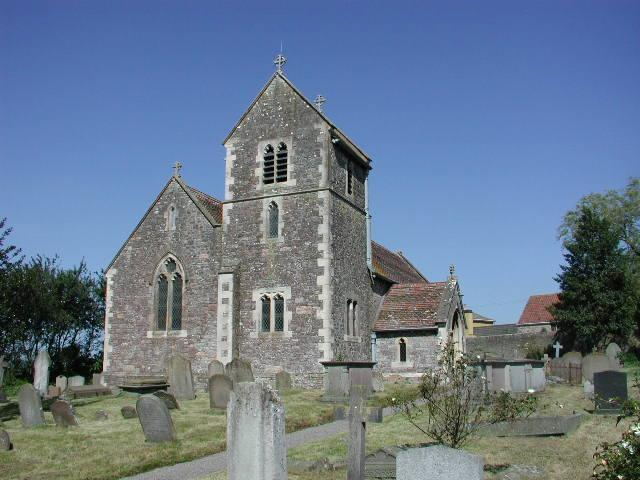

- Location within Gloucestershire
- OS grid reference: ST595899
- Civil parish: Aust
- Unitary authority: South Gloucestershire
- Ceremonial county: Gloucestershire
- Region: South West
- Country: England
- Sovereign state: United Kingdom
- Post town: Bristol
- Postcode district: BS35
- Police: Avon and Somerset
- Fire: Avon
- Ambulance: South Western
- UK Parliament: Thornbury and Yate

Littleton-upon-Severn is a village and former civil parish, now in the parish of Aust, in the South Gloucestershire district, in the ceremonial county of Gloucestershire, England, near the mouth of the River Severn, located to the west of Thornbury. Historically, it belonged to the Hundred of Langley and Swinehead. In 1931, the parish had a population of 179. On 1 April 1935, the parish was abolished and merged with Aust.

A church was first mentioned as being in the village when the abbot of Malmesbury held a court leet here each year under a licence from king Edward the Martyr (975-979), and in the Domesday Book it was listed as being in the Langley hundred, and having a priest and thirty acres of pasture. During the 12th century, the wooden church was replaced with a stone building. Both the font and the piscina are also of 12th-century origin.

The present parish church of St Mary's of Malmesbury is a Grade II* listed building, having been registered on 30 March 1960. It dates from the fourteenth century but was largely rebuilt in 1878. It is built out of rubble stone in the Decorated style, with a roof of fish-scale tiles. The plan consists of a nave, south porch and aisle, chancel, north vestry, and tower at the west end.

The village contains a popular 17th century pub called The White Hart.

Littleton Brick Pits are an artificial lagoon, once the site of clay extraction for brick making, where the Avon Wildlife Trust have reintroduced reedbeds close to the Severn Estuary as a feeding and resting place for migrating birds.
