= Bagstone =

Village in Gloucestershire, England

Coordinates: 51.586°N 2.451°W

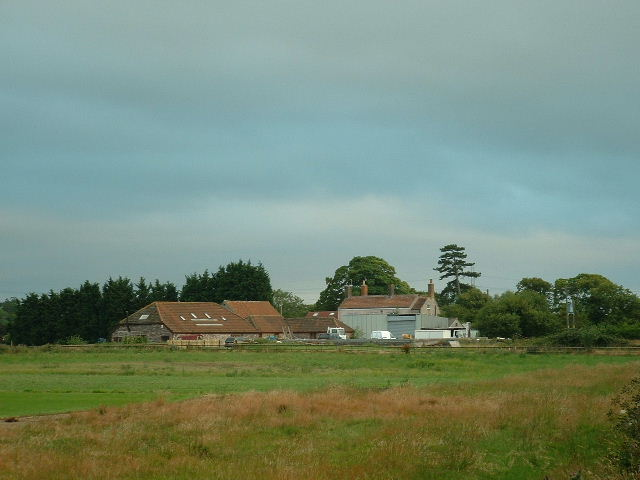
- Bagstone

- Location within Gloucestershire
- OS grid reference: ST688875
- Unitary authority: South Gloucestershire
- Ceremonial county: Gloucestershire
- Region: South West
- Country: England
- Sovereign state: United Kingdom
- Police: Avon and Somerset
- Fire: Avon
- Ambulance: South Western

Bagstone is a village in South Gloucestershire, England. Bagstone is on the B4058 between Rangeworthy and Cromhall.
