= Earthcott =

Hamlet in Gloucestershire, England

Coordinates: 51°34′11″N 2°30′27″W

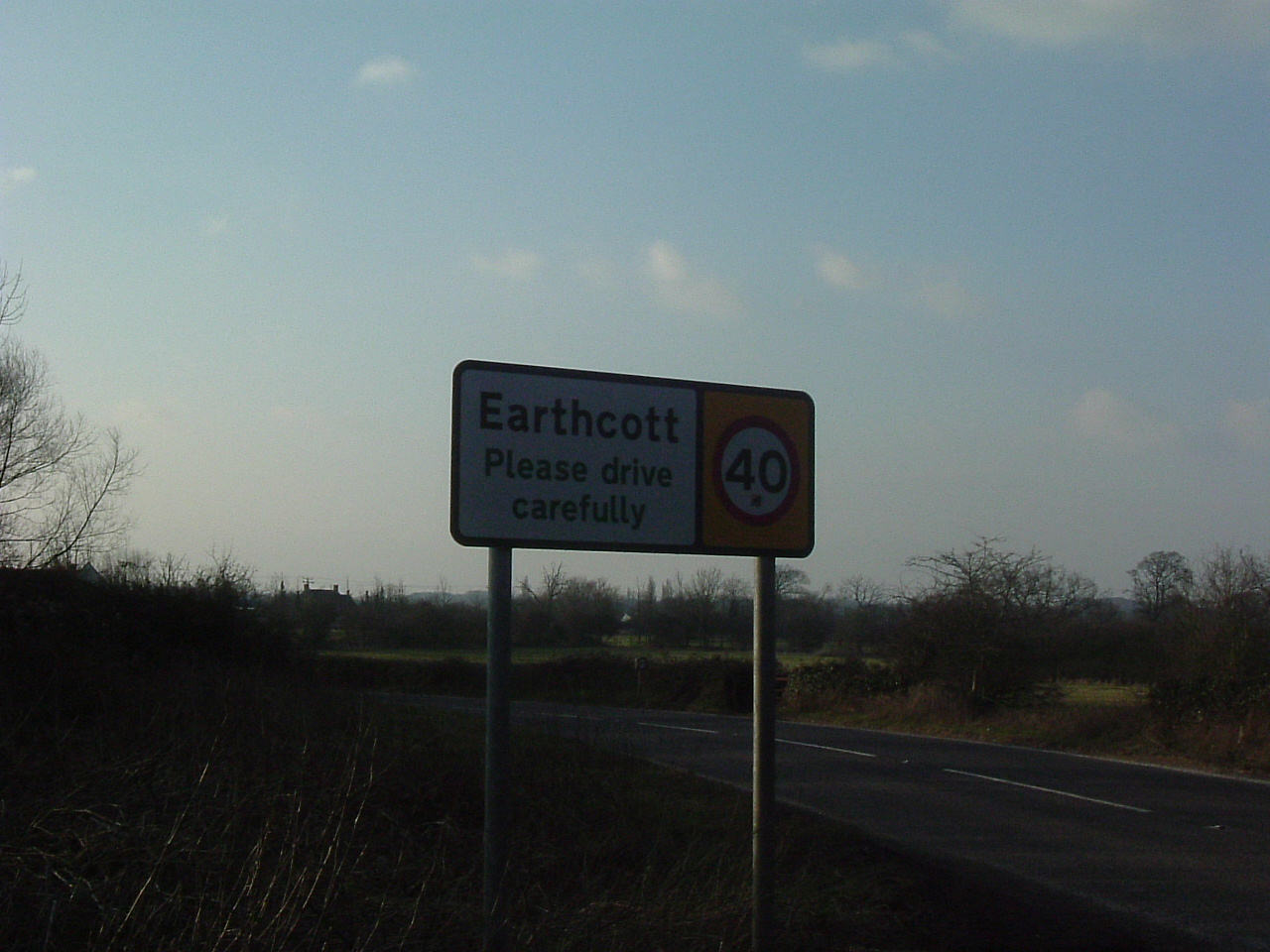
Earthcott sign in March 2006

Earthcott (or Earthcott Green) is a hamlet in the civil parish of Alveston in South Gloucestershire, England, between Latteridge and Rudgeway on the B4059 road between the A38 road and Yate. It has a letter box and a small village green, but no other services. Its main industry is farming.

The place-name 'Earthcott' is first attested in the Domesday Book of 1086, where it appears as 'Herdicote'. It derives from the Old English 'eorthe-cot' meaning 'earth hut' ('cot' as in the modern English words 'dovecote' and 'cottage').

Traditions of Earthcott include a village bonfire night, and Christmas Eve carol singing, normally done on the back of a tractor-trailer, with regular stops for mince pies and hot toddy.

Earthcott should not be confused with the nearby hamlet of Gaunt's Earthcott.

There is a small 1870 Wesleyan Chapel now converted into a house. Last service 1969.
