= Do Not Stand at My Grave and Weep =

1934 poem by Clare Harner

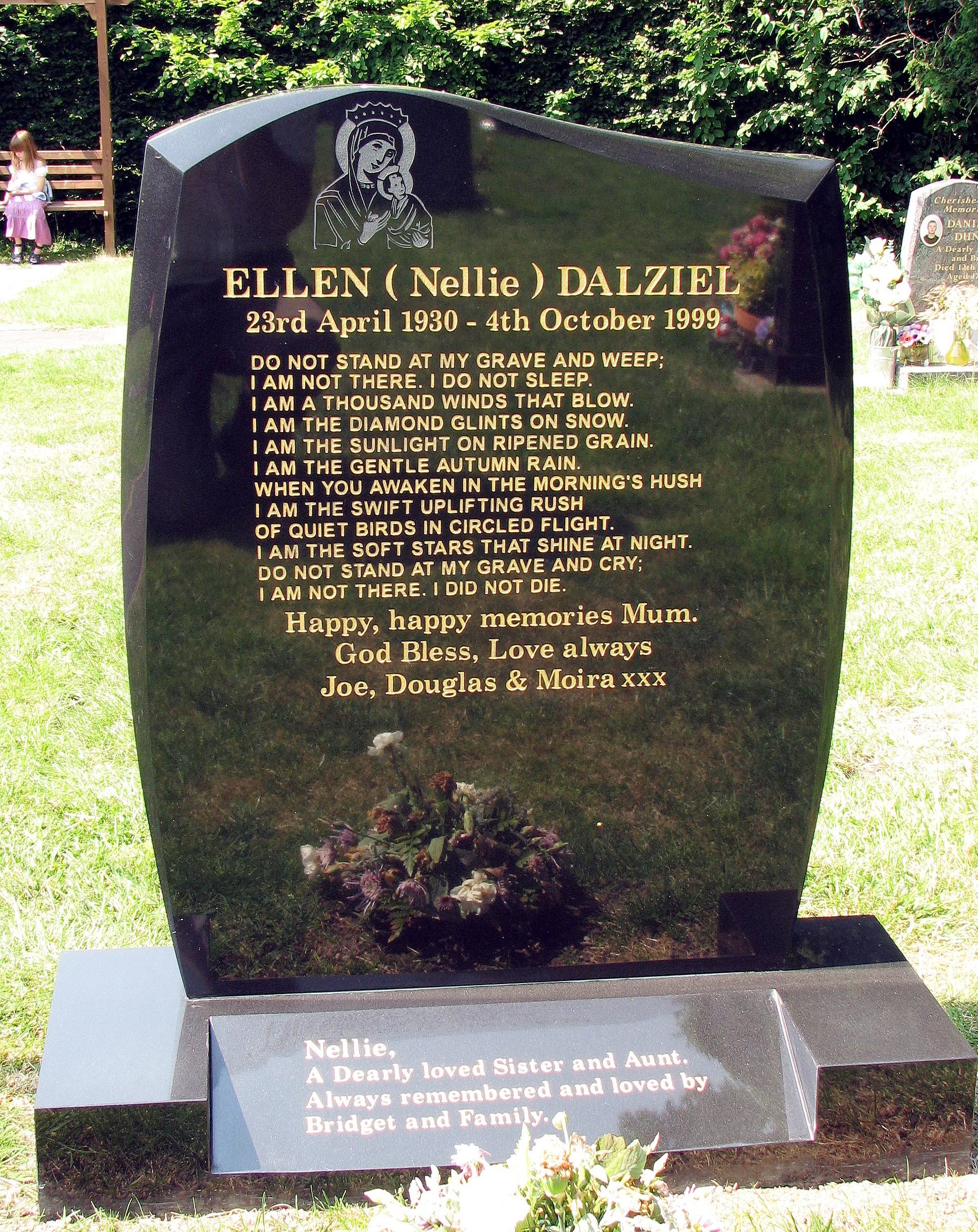
The poem on a gravestone at St Peter's church, Wapley, England

"Do not stand by my grave and weep" is the first line and popular title of the bereavement poem "Immortality" by Clare Harner, published in 1934. Often now used is a slight variant: "Do not stand at my grave and weep".

== Original version ==
Kansas native Clare Harner (1909–1977) first published "Immortality" in the December 1934 issue of poetry magazine The Gypsy and was reprinted in their February 1935 issue:

Do not stand
By my grave, and weep.
I am not there,
I do not sleep—
I am the thousand winds that blow
I am the diamond glints in snow
I am the sunlight on ripened grain,
I am the gentle, autumn rain.
As you awake with morning's hush,
I am the swift, up-flinging rush
Of quiet birds in circling flight,
I am the day transcending night.
Do not stand
By my grave, and cry—
I am not there,
I did not die.

— Clare Harner, The Gypsy, December 1934

The poem was written shortly after the sudden death of Harner's brother. The verse quickly gained traction as a eulogy and was read at funerals in Kansas and Missouri. It was soon reprinted in the Kansas City Times and the Kansas City Bar Bulletin.

Harner earned a degree in industrial journalism and clothing design at Kansas State University. Several of her other poems were published and anthologized. She married a Marine named David Lyon, and appended his last name to hers. They moved to San Francisco where she continued to work as a journalist for Fairchild Fashion Media.

== Plagiarism ==
The poem is often attributed to anonymous or incorrect sources, such as the Hopi and Navajo tribes. The most notable claimant was Mary Elizabeth Frye (1905–2004), who often handed out xeroxed copies of the poem with her name attached. She was first wrongly cited as the author of the poem in 1983. In her obituary, it was asserted that her authorship was "undisputed" and confirmed by Dear Abby. However, Pauline Phillips and her daughter Jeanne Phillips, writing as Abigail van Buren, repeatedly confessed to their readers that they could not confirm who had written the popular poem.

== Other versions ==
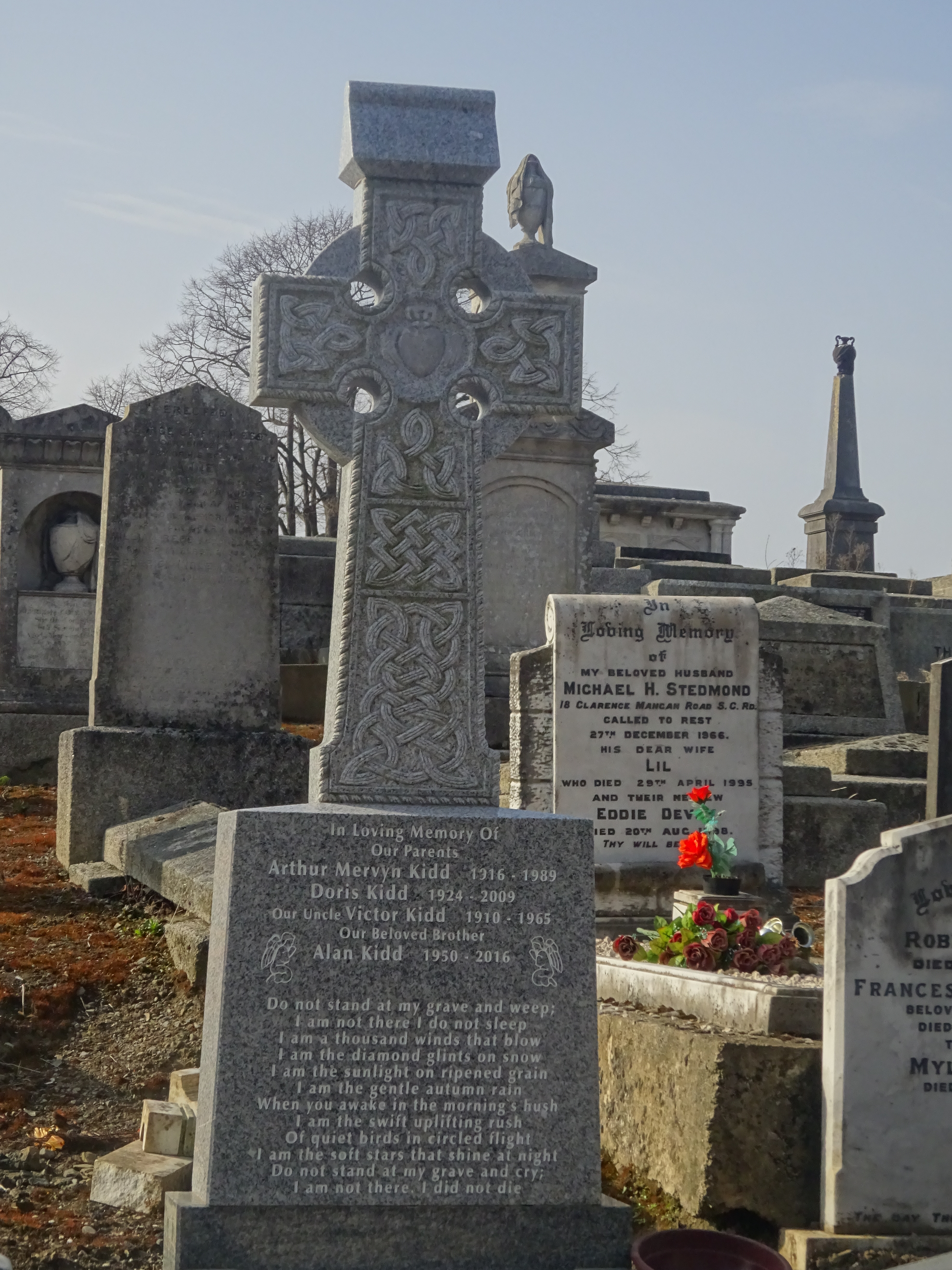
The poem on a gravestone in Mount Jerome, Dublin, Ireland

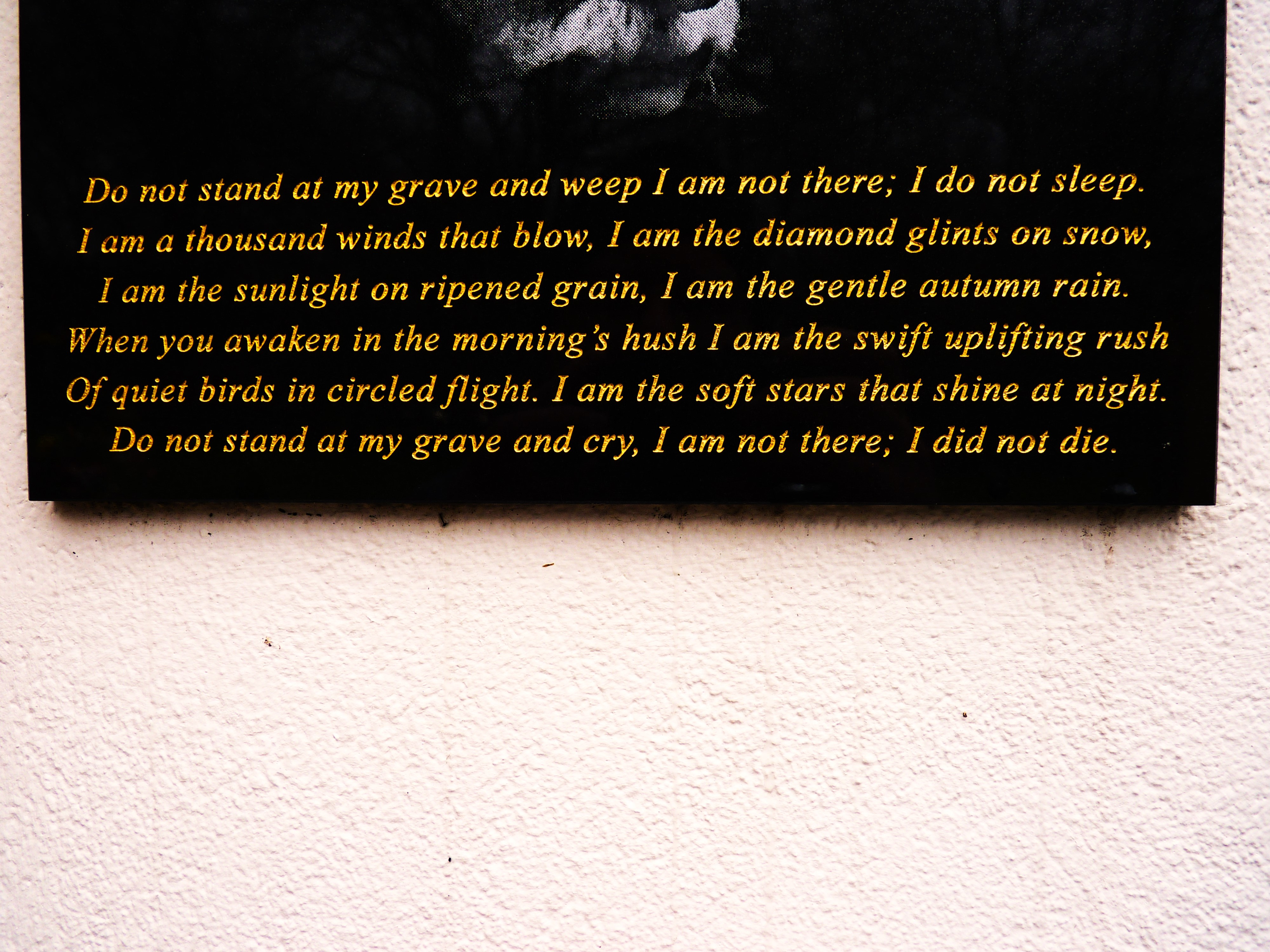
The poem, on a plaque at the Albin Memorial Gardens, Culling Road, London SE16

Other versions of the poem appeared later, usually without attribution, such as the one below. Differing words are shown in italics.

Do not stand at my grave and weep,
I am not there, I do not sleep.
I am a thousand winds that blow;
I am the diamond glints on the snow.
I am the sunlight on ripened grain;
I am the gentle autumn's rain.
When you awaken in the morning's hush,
I am the swift uplifting rush
Of quiet birds in circled flight.
I am the soft star that shines at night.
Do not stand at my grave and cry.
I am not there; I did not die.

This version of the poem is twelve lines long, rhyming in couplets. Each line is in iambic tetrameter, except for lines five and seven, the fifth having an extra syllable, the seventh, two extra.

== In popular culture ==
- John Wayne read the poem "from an unspecified source" on 29 December 1977, at the memorial service for film director Howard Hawks. After hearing John Wayne's reading, script writer John Carpenter featured the poem in the 1979 television film Better Late Than Never.
- It is also reproduced on the gravestone of the actor Charles Bronson.
- The poem was recited on live broadcast at the funeral of Michael Hutchence, the founding member and lead singer of rock band INXS, by his sister Tina Hutchence on 27 November 1997
- The poem is read by actress Constance Zimmer in the character role of Ann Messina Freeman in the 2026 TV series Love Story in episode 9 during the memorial scene for John F. Kennedy Jr., Carolyn Bessette-Kennedy, and Lauren Bessette.
- A shortened version of the poem is read by actress Ruth Wilson in the 6th episode of the 2023 BBC TV drama The Woman in the Wall.
- Japanese translation of the poem "Immortality" by Clare Harner set to music composed and performed by Mitsuru Arai.
- American synthwave band The Midnight sampled lines from the poem for their song "Quiet Earth" on their album Syndicate.
- In the BBC series Ann Droid S01E03, Ann Droid "Linda" recites the poem when prompted for a more "upbeat" funeral speech.
- A version of the poem was recited by actress Kathryn Joosten in her role as Karen McCluskey in S04E10 of Desperate Housewives.

== BBC poll ==
To coincide with National Poetry Day 1995, the British television programme The Bookworm conducted a poll to discover the nation's favourite poems, and subsequently published the winning poems in book form. The book's preface stated that "Do Not Stand at My Grave and Weep" was "the unexpected poetry success of the year from Bookworm's point of view"; the poem had "provoked an extraordinary response... the requests started coming in almost immediately and over the following weeks the demand rose to a total of some thirty thousand. In some respects it became the nation's favourite poem by proxy... despite it being outside the competition." This was all the more remarkable, since the name and nationality of the American poet did not become known until several years later. In 2004 The Times wrote: "The verse demonstrated a remarkable power to soothe loss. It became popular, crossing national boundaries for use on bereavement cards and at funerals regardless of race, religion or social status".
