= Downend air crash =

Air crash near Bristol, England

Downend Air Crash
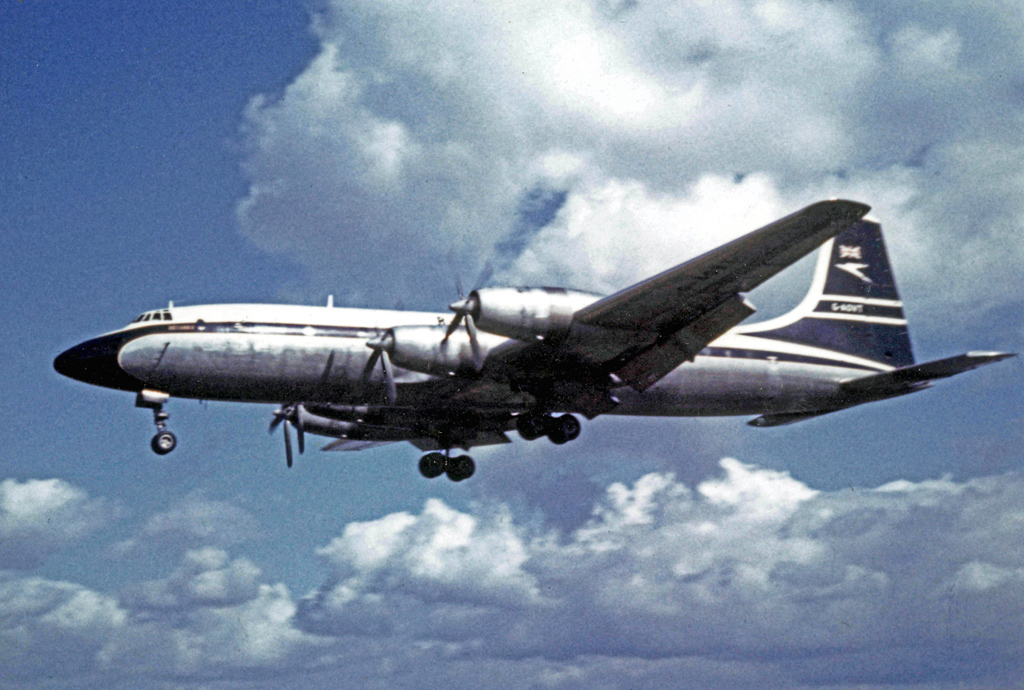
- A Bristol Britannia similar to the accident aircraft

Accident
- Date: 6 November 1957
- Summary: Unknown cause
- Site: Downend, near Bristol, UK; 51.4897°N 2.5109°W
- Total injuries: 1

Aircraft
- Aircraft type: Bristol Britannia Type 301
- Operator: Bristol Aeroplane Company
- Registration: G-ANCA
- Occupants: 15
- Passengers: 0
- Crew: 15
- Fatalities: 15
- Survivors: 0

Ground casualties
- Ground injuries: 1

The Downend air crash occurred on 6 November 1957 when a prototype Bristol Britannia aircraft crashed in woods near Overndale Road in Downend, a suburb of Bristol, England, on its landing approach at Filton airport during a test flight. All fifteen on board – four crew and 11 technicians – died in the crash.

== Cause ==
The exact cause of the crash was never determined, but was suspected to be a malfunction of the autopilot, possibly due to faulty wiring. The company which manufactured the autopilot system issued a statement claiming it was not due to the autopilot system, but still altered the system in newer aircraft; the official report states unknown cause but "the autopilot system cannot be ruled out as the likely cause".

Another source cites the cause as "...an instrument failure which ultimately led to a loss of control."

== Casualties ==
All 15 aboard died in the crash. Despite the aircraft coming down in a residential area, nobody on the ground was killed. One woman, a resident of Overndale Road, was taken to hospital after being hurt by the impact blast when one of the engines and part of the wing landed next to her house while she was hanging washing on the line in the garden. Another man, who at the time was tiling the roof of a nearby house, broke his arm after falling having been shocked by the aircraft's low flight path.

== Memorials ==
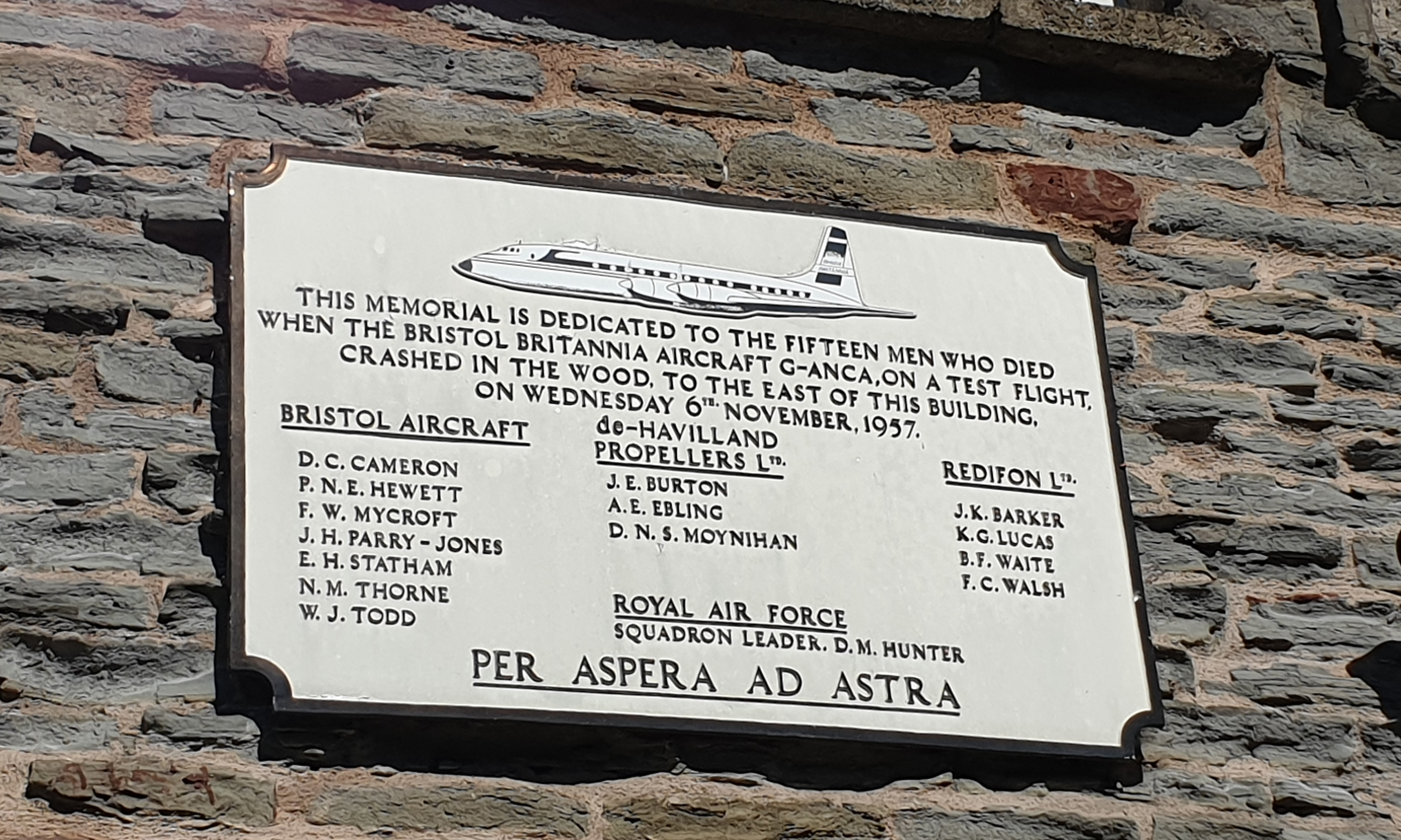
Memorial plaque on Downend Folk House

A memorial service was held at Bristol Cathedral on 19 November 1957.

Commemorative events were held on 25th and 34th anniversaries, when the first memorial plaque listing the names of the dead was erected at Downend Folk House. Downend Local History Society holds its meetings in the building, which have one of its rooms named Britannia Room.

A memorial plaque at the crash site, now called Britannia Wood, was unveiled on 3 November 2007 by Beryl Statham, the pilot's widow.

A memorial plaque honouring the 42 employees of the Bristol Aeroplane Company who lost their lives in the course of their duties, which included the 15 who died in the Downend crash, was unveiled at Aerospace Bristol on 6 November 2025, the 68th anniversary of the crash.
