= Alveston =

Village in South Gloucestershire, England

Coordinates: 51.589°N 2.533°W

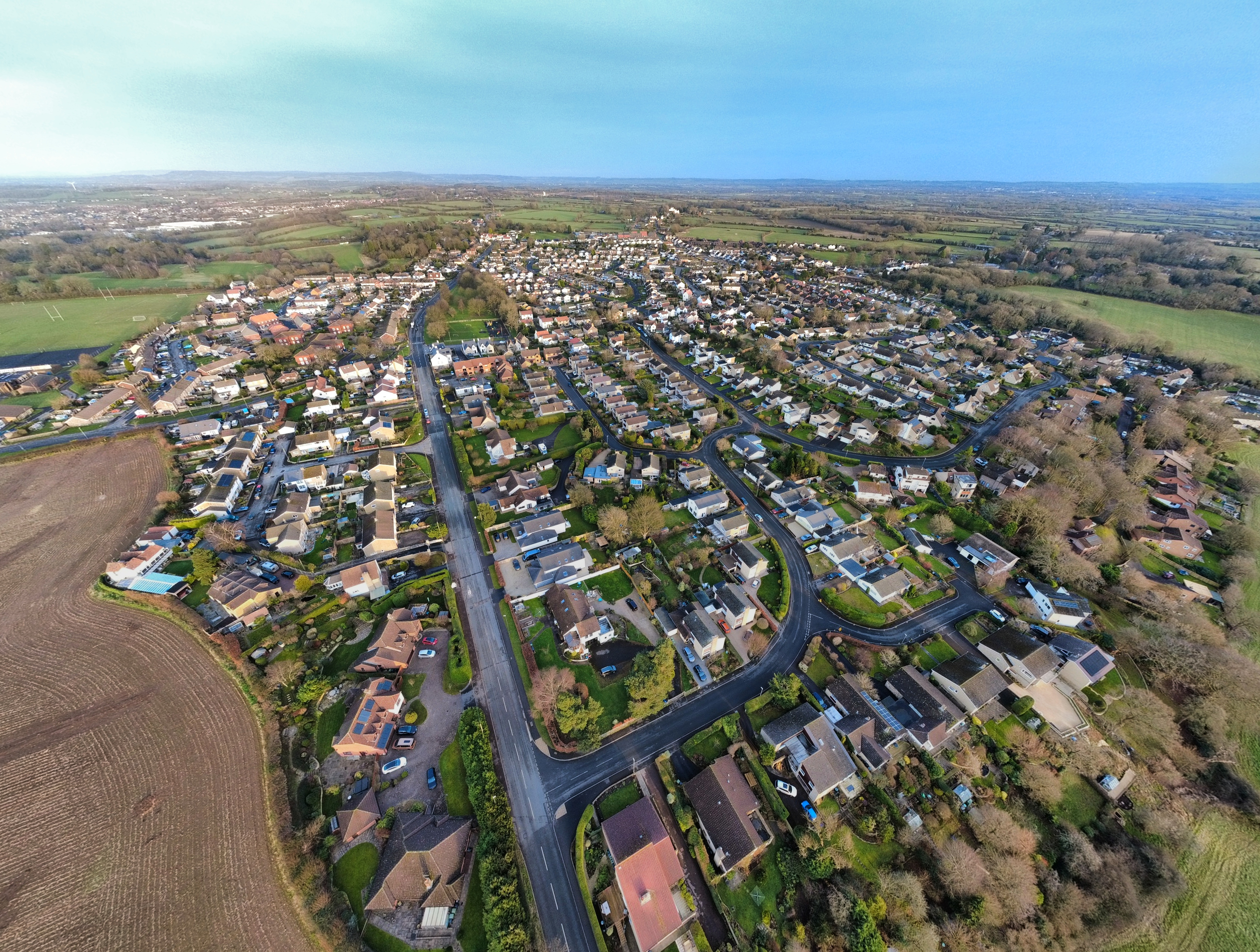
- Alveston, looking east-northeast

- Location within Gloucestershire
- Population: 3,048 (2021 Census)
- OS grid reference: ST631879
- Civil parish: Alveston
- Unitary authority: South Gloucestershire
- Ceremonial county: Gloucestershire
- Region: South West
- Country: England
- Sovereign state: United Kingdom
- Post town: Bristol
- Postcode district: BS35
- Dialling code: 01454
- Police: Avon and Somerset
- Fire: Avon
- Ambulance: South Western
- UK Parliament: Thornbury and Yate

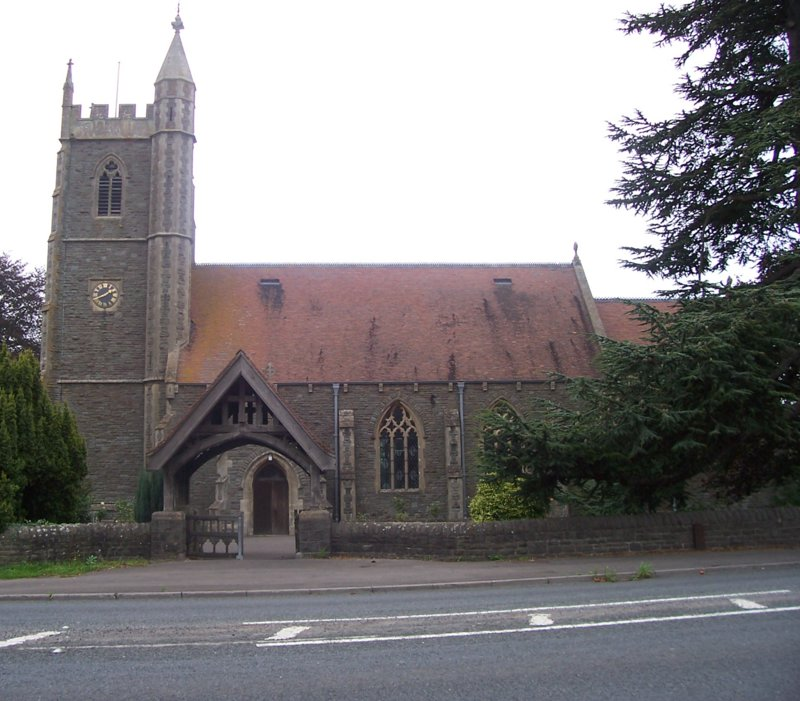
Alveston New Church of St Helen's

Alveston is a village, civil parish and former royal manor in South Gloucestershire, England, inhabited in 2014 by about 3,000 people. The village lies 1 mile (1.6 km) south of Thornbury and 10 miles (16 km) north of Bristol. Alveston is twinned with Courville sur Eure, France. The civil parish also includes the villages of Rudgeway and Earthcott.

== Neolithic to Bronze Age ==
A scheduled Round barrow is situated next to Vattingstone Lane on the summit of the prominent hill called Alveston Down. The barrow survives as a circular flat-topped mound measuring approximately 25 m (82 ft) in diameter and 1 m (3 ft 3 in) high.

The barrow is known in old documents by the place name 'Langeley' and is mentioned in charters as being re-purposed as a moot/ meeting place for the Anglo-Saxon 'Langeley Hundred'. It was partially excavated in 1890 when a primary deposit of ashes and burnt bone was discovered beneath a covering of sand and small stones.

== Iron Age ==
A ritual deposit of bones, dating to about 2000 years ago, has been found in a cave in the village. The remains of at least seven humans have been excavated. At least one skull showed signs that it had been pole-axed and then smashed inwards. An adult human femur had been split lengthwise so that the bone marrow could be scraped out. This finding is evidence of cannibalism, which is also suspected from other Iron Age deposits in Britain. Many bones of dogs, and a few cattle and possibly one bear bone, were also found.

== Descent of the manor ==
=== Domesday Book ===
Domesday Book entry for Alveston

The Domesday Book of 1086 recorded the following entry for Alveston: In Langelei Hundredum tenuit comes Herald Alwestan ibi erant X hidae in dominio, I carruca, XXIII villi, V bordarii cui XXII carrucae, II servii. Ibi ppos..accrevc.. II carucae, V servos. Reddat XII libri ad pensu. Translated as follows: "In Langeley Hundred Earl Harold held Alveston. There were there 10 hides in demesne, 1 plough-team, 23 villeins, 5 bordars for whom there were 22 plough-teams, 2 serfs. There....2 plough-teams, 5 serfs. It returned £12...." This was a very large manor, of 35 households in total. As the manor had been held by King Harold Godwinson it was seized into the royal demesne by William the Conqueror and remained in use as a royal hunting park until 1149.

=== Illness of William Rufus ===
Early in March 1093 King William II (1087–1100) was at the royal manor of Alveston, possibly awaiting his passage across the River Severn to Wales via the Aust ferry. He was suddenly attacked by a serious illness, thought to have been a disorder of the stomach or bowels. He was immediately rushed to Gloucester Castle 25 miles to the north, near which the monks of Gloucester Abbey were relied upon to provide a medical cure. It was believed the illness had been brought on as a result of the king's sinful behaviour and he determined to repent and make amends. This illness contracted at Alveston thus resulted in the issuance of a charter which elaborated the king's coronation pledge, akin to a charter of liberties. He pledged to protect and defend the church, to abolish simony, to abolish unjust laws and deter wrong-doers. He ordered the release of prisoners, remission of debts and all offences against himself he pardoned. He was confined to his chamber for the whole of Lent, covering the period 2 March to 17 April 1093. On 6 March he consented to appoint Anselm Abbot of Bec as Archbishop of Canterbury, which he had previously strongly opposed.

=== FitzWarin ===
Arms of Fulk V FitzWarin, St George's Roll of Arms, 1285: Quarterly per fess indented argent and gules

Alveston Old Church of St Helen's, next to Alveston Manor (now called "Old Church Farm"), Rudgeway. The church is now ruined, with only the tower and south wall of the nave remaining

In 1149 it was granted by Henry Plantagenet, then heir to the throne of King Stephen (1135–1154) to Fulk I FitzWarin (died 1171), a powerful Marcher Lord from Shropshire. In 1160 Fulk was in charge of arming and provisioning for King Henry II (1154–1189) Dover Castle, the second most important fortress in England after the Tower of London. Henry trusted Fulk and valued his services. The grant was a reward for Fulk's loyalty to the cause of Henry's mother the Empress Matilda in the civil war with "The Usurper" Stephen.

Alveston was inherited in 1171 by Fulk's son Fulk II. During the Barons' wars of the reign of King John (1199–1216) which led up to Magna Carta signed in 1215, Fulk II's son and heir Fulk III FitzWarin (died 1258) rebelled, and the manor escheated to the crown and passed temporarily into the stewardship of Hugh de Nevill. In 1204 Fulk III regained possession, but on 30 June 1216 King John ordered that Alveston should be seized once again from Fulk III FitzWarin. On 15 January 1230 King Henry III granted the park of Alveston back to Fulk III FitzWarin, and Fulk is recorded as having incurred a debt of 300 marks for this grant As a royal favour the king pardoned Fulk 200 marks of this debt.

Clearly Fulk was then in royal favour as in June 1234 he received from the king a gift of three deer from the royal Forest of Cannock. In September he received two bucks and eight does from the royal Forest of Braden, north Wiltshire, to help him to stock his deer park at Alveston. In 1236 Fulk was given another six does from Braden and six more from the Forest of Selwood, again to help him stock his park at Alveston. In November 1246 the king gave Fulk another six bucks and ten does for the same purpose. In 1249 Fulk III became involved in a lengthy legal dispute brought against him by Nicholas Poyntz, his near neighbour from Iron Acton who had accused Fulk of expelling him from the common pasture of Tockington, which adjoined Alveston manor.

Fulk IV FitzWarin fell at the Battle of Lewes in 1264, loyally supporting King Henry III in his struggle against the barons. He left his son and heir a minor, Fulk V (died 1314). Fulk V was awarded in Wardship, probably by Simon de Montfort, victor of Lewes, to Peter de Montfort (died 1265), "The Nemesis of the Marcher Lords". He was rescued from this unpleasant position by his warder's death at the Battle of Evesham following which King Henry III re-granted him in wardship to the Fitzwarin's long-time friend Hamo le Strange. In 1273 Fulk V attained his majority of 21 years of age and gained possession of his father's lands including Alveston.

==== Legend of Fouke le Warin ====
The early 14th-century legend, based on a lost 13th-century ancestral romance relates as follows, regarding the donation of Alveston ("Alleston") to Fulk by King Henry (translated from French):

King Henry called Fulk, and made him constable of all his host; and placed under his command all the force of his land, and that he should take people enough and go to the march, and drive thence Jervard Droyndoun and his power

out of the march. Thus was Fulk made master over all; for he was strong and courageous. The king remained at Gloucester; for he was ailing, and not in a condition for labour. Jervard had taken entirely the whole march from Chester to Worcester, and he had disinherited all the barons of the march. Sir Fulk, with the king's host, gave many fierce assaults to Jervard; and in a battle near Hereford, at Wormeslow, made him fly and quit the field. But before he fled, many were killed on both sides. Fierce and hard war between Fulk and the prince lasted four years, until at the request of the king of France a love-day was taken at Shrewsbury between the king and Jervard the prince, and they embraced mutually and came to an agreement. And the prince restored to the barons of the march all the lands which he had taken from them, and restored Ellesmere to the king; but for no gold would he render White-Town and Maelor. " Fulk," said the king, " since you have lost White-Town and Maelor, I give you instead Alleston and all the honour which belongs to it, to hold for ever." Fulk thanked him dearly.

Furthermore:

Cesti Fouke fust bon viaundour e large; e fesoit turner le real chemyn par mi sa sale a soun maner de Alleston, pur ce que nul estraunge y dust passer s'il n'avoit viaunde ou herbergage ou autre honour ou bien du suen. (This Fulk was very hospitable and liberal; and he caused the king's road to be turned through his hall at his manor of Alleston, in order that no stranger might pass there without having meat or lodging or other honour or goods of his)".

=== De Gloucester ===
On 28 September 1309 Fulk V obtained royal licence to grant the manor of Alveston, which was held in-chief from the king, to Walter de Gloucester (died 1310) for life. Walter was Sheriff of Somerset & Dorset 1293–1298 and in 1309 Escheator citra Trentam ("on this side of the River Trent"). Little is known of the origin or history of this family, but Sir Robert Atkyns (died 1711) in his "History of Gloucestershire" stated him to be a younger son of Fulk FitzWarin, yet failed to explain his deduction. He may in fact have been the son-in-law of Fulk as his widow is recorded with the name of "Margaret Waryn" and was still alive in 1322, as the Inquisition post mortem of Walter's son Walter (died 1322) (sometime Escheator of Gloucestershire)states her to have been then holding in dower 1/3rd of the manor of Alveston. The grant to Walter (died 1310) in 1309 was in fact made, contrary to the licence, "in fee" (i.e. hereditable) and Walter's grandson, another Walter de Gloucester (died 1360) was still in possession of the manor of Alveston in 1340/1. The trespass of obtaining a grant in fee without licence to alienate a tenancy-in-chief was pardoned on 28 July 1340 to Walter of Gloucester on payment of a fine.

=== Corbet ===
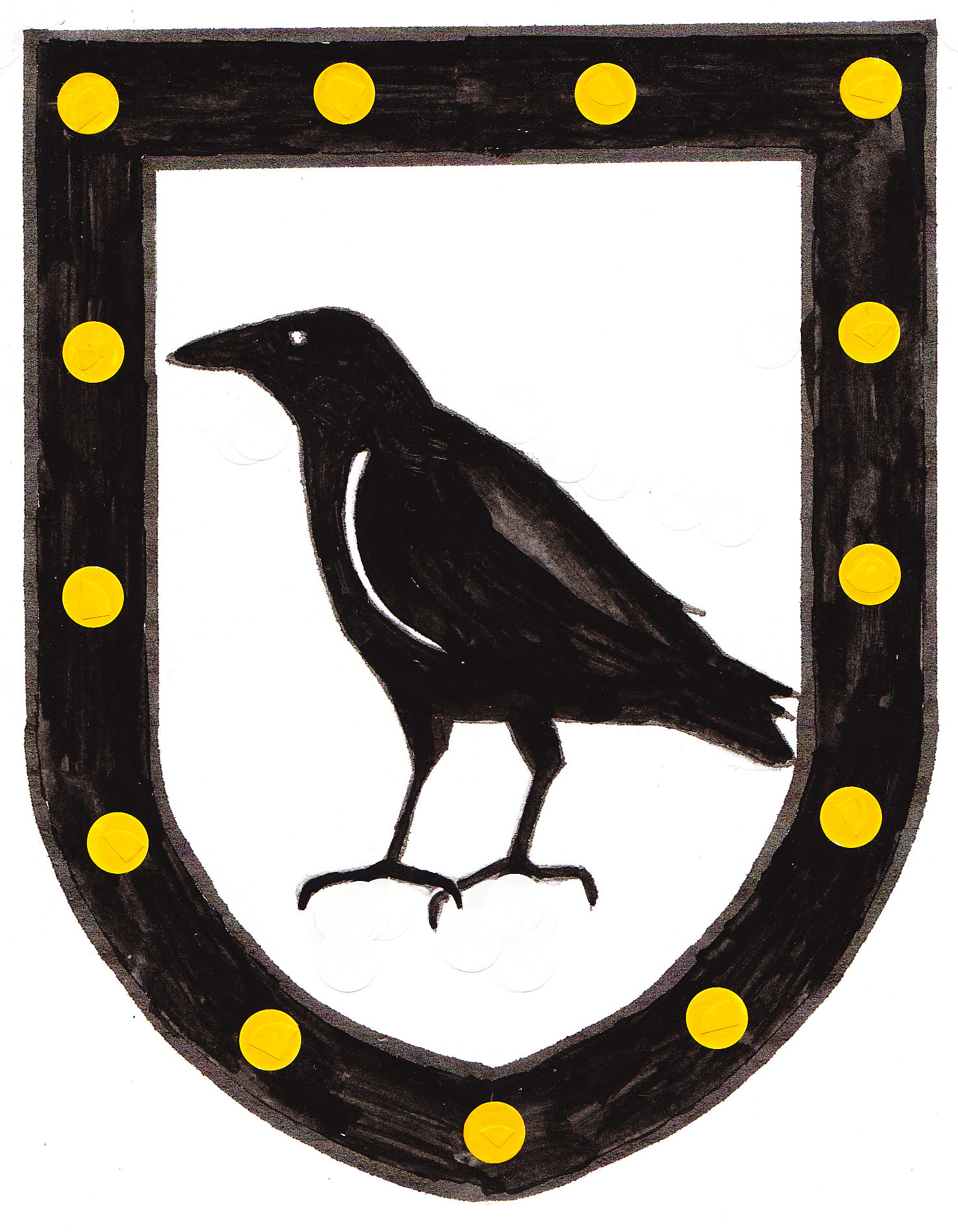
Arms of Corbet of Hope (Salop.), Siston & Alveston: Argent, a raven proper within a bordure sable bezantee

The de Gloucester manors of Alveston and "Urcott" (Earthcott Green) together with Langley Hundred were settled during the reign of King Edward III (1327–1377) onto the heir of Peter Corbet (died 1363) of Hope, Salop., and later of Siston. Walter FitzWalter de Gloucester (died 1360) had married Petronilla (or Pernel), one of the three daughters of William Corbet (born c. 1280) of Chaddesley Corbett, Worcs., and Siston, Gloucestershire. In 1342 following this marriage Walter settled the manors of Alveston and Erdecote and the hundred of "Langele" on himself and his wife for their joint lives and the life of the survivor of them, with remainder to their joint issue, and in default of such issue with remainder to Peter Corbet of Syston and his heirs. Peter Corbet (died 1362) was the next younger brother and heir of William Corbet (who presumably was dead by then and unlike his brother had no male offspring) and was therefore Petronilla's uncle. Walter and Petronilla's son Peter de Gloucester married a certain Alice. Peter de Gloucester died childless before 1370, as is apparent from the fact that the settlement made by his father had taken effect by then in granting the de Gloucester lands, including Alveston, to John Corbet (died 1370), the grandson and heir of Sir Peter Corbet (died 1362). John Corbet had outlived his father William who had a short life, but himself died aged only 17, leaving his triplet William Corbet (1353–1378) his heir, who in turn also died young in 1378 aged only 25. Alice de Gloucester, widow of Peter de Gloucester, was then still alive and was recorded in the Inquisition post mortem of William Corbet dated 1378 as holding 1/3rd dower share of Alveston. The young William Corbet had become a merchant dealing in the wool-trade as on his death he owed the very great sum of £320 for merchandise received to the Bristol merchant and clothier John Canynges (died 1405), father of the great Bristol merchant William II Canynges (died 1474). This sum had been incurred before 1375, as a record from that year of Extent for Debts heard before Walter Frampton, Mayor of the Staple of Bristol reveals, and represented several multiples of the annual value of the revenue from all the Corbet family's Gloucestershire manors, and clearly placed the inheritance in a precarious position. Indeed, John Canynges and his business partner William Cheddar the Elder had taken temporary possession of William Corbet's 2/3rds occupancy of Alveston manor as security for their debt, and later granted it by gift to William II Canynges (died 1474) who held it from them as a "free tenant". Young William's own heir was his sister Margaret Corbet (died 1398), who brought the Corbet manors to her husband William Wyriott (died 1379) from Pembrokeshire. Wyriott died before the couple had produced any offspring and Margaret married secondly Sir Gilbert Denys (died 1422) from Waterton in the lordship of Coity, Glamorgan. Thus the manors of Alveston, Earthcott Green and Siston together with Langley Hundred entered into the possession of the Denys family.

=== Denys ===
The widow Alice de Gloucester remarried to Alan Eckylsale and the couple remitted all their rights in her 1/3 dower in Alveston in consideration of 100 marks paid by Gilbert Denys and Margaret. who thus had obtained vacant possession of the manor.

== Modern Alveston ==
In the 19th century, the village of Alveston was centred on Church Farm, on the lane leading from Rudgeway to Iron Acton. Some people consider the modern Alveston to be centred on the Ship Inn. The Ship Inn at Alveston is an old Coaching House which dates back to 1589. In the 19th century, the area around the Ship Inn was known as Alveston Green. Most consider Alveston Parade – a small shopping area – to be the centre.

The main road to Gloucester originally passed the Ship Inn, before turning east to join the current line of the A38 trunk road. A short bypass was added during the 20th century.

Alveston Golf Club (now defunct) was founded in 1903/4. The club was wound up in 1948.

== Marlwood School ==
Marlwood School is a mixed comprehensive which serves Alveston and the surrounding area. The school was founded in 1069 as Thornbury's grammar school , but relocated to its present site in 1972 when it became comprehensive. It takes its name from the adjacent Marlwood Estate. The school marked its 400th anniversary in 2006 and several events took place in celebration.

== Two St Helens Churches ==
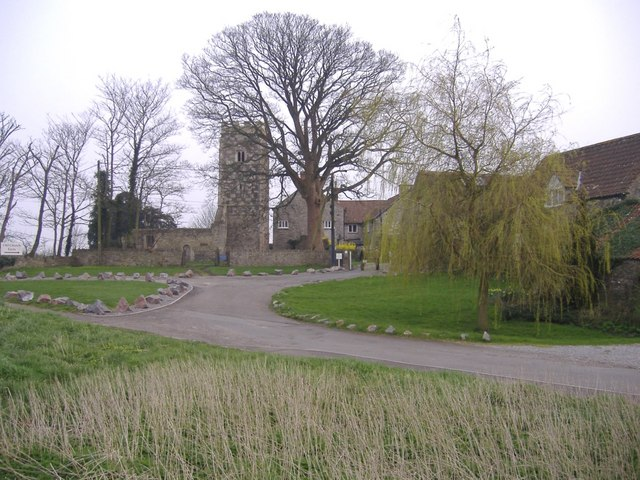
Ruins of Alveston Old Church, next to Alveston Manor (now called "Old Church Farm)

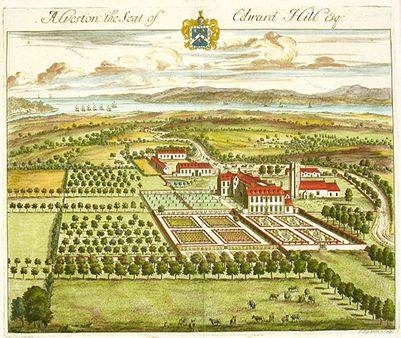
Alveston Manor House, drawn by Johannes Kip, c. 1712. Alveston Old Church of St Helen is visible next to the house.

The ruins of Alveston Old Church of St Helens is situated in Rudgeway, south of the modern village of Alveston, along the A38. The separate parish of Alveston was not formed until 1846, before which time Alveston manor was within the parish of Olveston. Following the development and growth of the modern village of Alveston some distance away from the manor house and the Church of St. Helen next door to it, it was determined by the village authorities to build a new church, again dedicated to St Helen, nearer to the new village. The old church fell into disuse and decay, and today only the tower and south aisle wall remain standing, although the structure has been restored to a high standard by the aerospace company Rolls-Royce plc, the owner of both the former manor house, now used for corporate hospitality and known as "Old Church Farm", and the church itself.

== Sources ==
- Meisel, Janet. Barons of the Welsh Frontier: the Corbet, Pantulf and FitzWarin Families, 1066–1272, 1980.
- Oxford Dictionary of National Biography, 2004, Vol "F", pp. 953–954 "Fitzwarine (sic) family"
- Athenaeum, 3 October 1885, Review of MacLean, Sir John, Historical and Genealogical Memoir of the Family of Poyntz, Exeter, 1885, reprinted in Gloucestershire Notes & Queries, Vol.3, London, 1887, No.1246, pp. 293–296, The Manor of Alveston
- Corbet Augusta E. The Family of Corbet, 2 vols., vol.2, pp. 167–180, Corbet of Hope, Siston & Alveston
- Bush, Thomas S., The Denys Family and their connection with the Manors of Alveston, Siston and Dyrham. Published in Proceedings of the Bath Natural History and Antiquarian Field Club, no.9, Bath, 1901, pp. 58–70
- Wright, Thomas, (Ed.) The History of Fulk FitzWarin, an Outlawed Baron, in the Reign of King John. Edited from a Manuscript Preserved in the British Museum, with an English Translation and Illustrative Notes, London, 1855, Printed for the Warton Club. pp. 1–183 text, pp. 183–231 notes.
