= Mangotsfield School =

Coordinates: 51.4799°N 2.4835°W

Location
- Rodway Hill; Mangotsfield, Gloucestershire, BS16 9LH; England

Information
- Type: Academy
- Motto: Community Achievement Growth
- Established: 1982
- Local authority: South Gloucestershire
- Department for Education URN: 142008 Tables
- Ofsted: Reports
- chair: Ann Duff
- Headteacher: Hetty Blackmore
- CEO: William Roberts
- Gender: Mixed
- Age: 11 to 16
- Enrolment: 1,050
- Houses: Siston, Rodway, Chase, Pomphrey
- Website: http://www.mangotsfieldschool.org.uk/

Mangotsfield School is a secondary school located in Mangotsfield in South Gloucestershire, north of the Kingswood suburb of Bristol.

== History ==
The school was formed in 1982 after a merger of two pre-existing schools; Rodway School (originally Rodway Technical High School) was established in 1957 and located at the current Mangotsfield School site opposite Rodway Common, and the Chase School for Boys was located in Cossham Street and was established in about 1966. The Cossham Street and Rodway sites provided the lower and upper school sites for Mangotsfield School respectively. The Cossham Street site was demolished in 1996 to make way for the Emersons Green housing estate. At this time, the whole school was moved to the enlarged Rodway site.

Previously a community school administered by South Gloucestershire Council, Mangotsfield School converted to academy status in September 2015 sponsored by Castle School Educational Trust. However the school continues to coordinate with South Gloucestershire Council for admissions.

== Structure ==
The school operates within five blocks:

- A Block: ICT, Business and Humanities.
- B Block: Art, Drama, P.E and Music
- C Block: maths, English and MFL
- D Block: Science
- E Block: Design Technology

The school also has a Student Centre, Dining Hall, drama and PE Sports Hall. It is complemented by an astro pitch and tennis courts (Rodway Hill Tennis Centre).

== Alumni ==
=== Rodway Technical High School ===
- Tim Brain - Chief Constable of Gloucestershire

=== Rodway School ===
- Sara Dallin and Keren Woodward of Bananarama
- Australian celebrity chef James Reeson – chase school for boys
- John Hegley, performance poet
- Phil Kite, goalkeeper for Bristol Rovers
- Dave Kirby, general legend

=== Former teachers ===
- Malcolm Arnold (athletics coach) (1964–68), became Head Coach of UK Athletics from 1994 to 1997
- David Parsons (councillor) CBE (science teacher in the 1980s), former president from 1975 to 1976 of Oxford University Student Union, and Conservative Leader from 2003 to 2012 of Leicestershire County Council
