= Wapley =

Village in Gloucestershire, England

Coordinates: 51.513°N 2.412°W

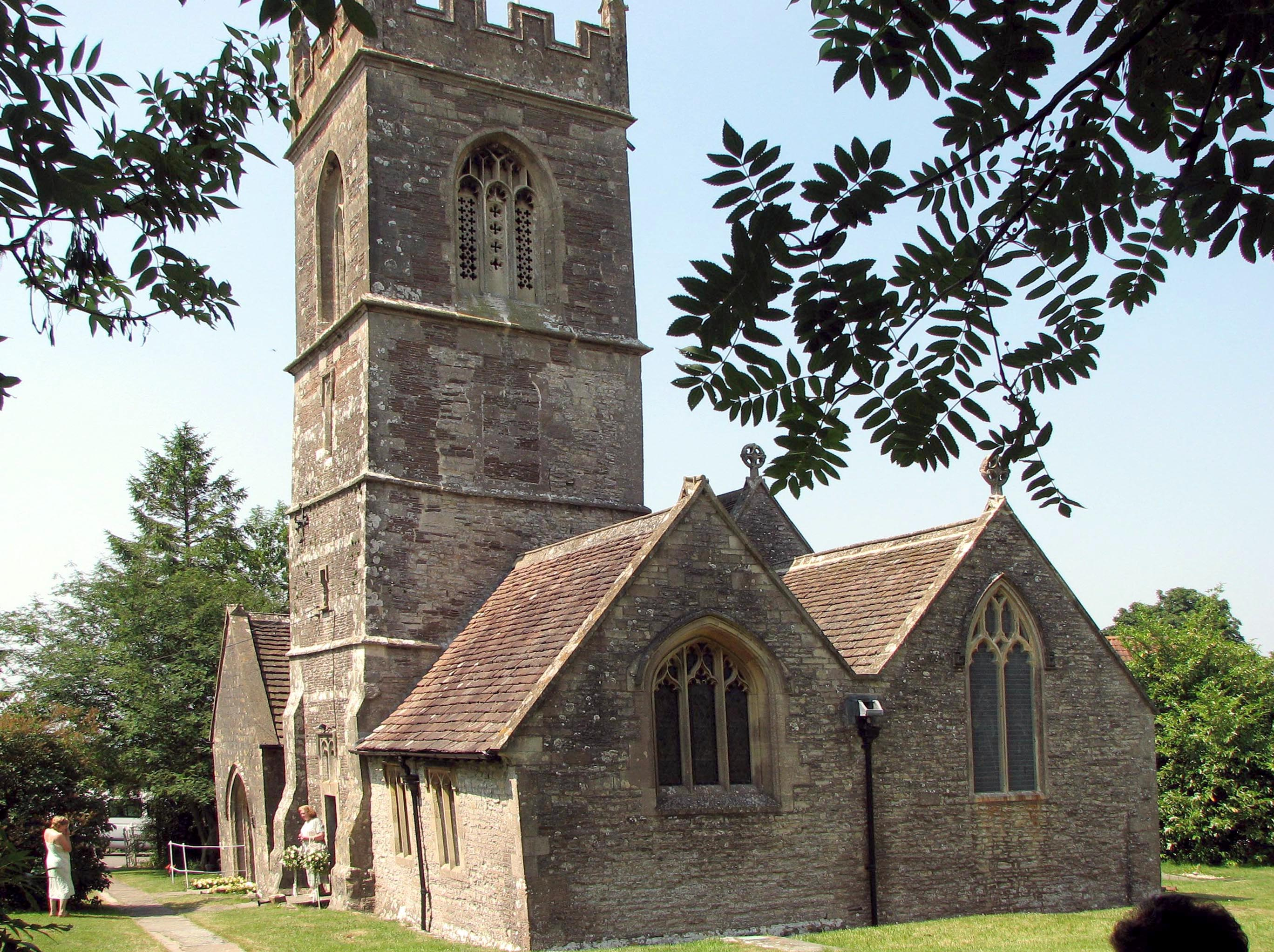
St Peter's, the village church of Wapley

Wapley is a rural village in South Gloucestershire, England.

== See also ==
- Do not stand at my grave and weep
