= Northwick, South Gloucestershire =

Hamlet in South Gloucestershire, England

Coordinates: 51°34.64178′N 2°38.1207′W

- Hamlet
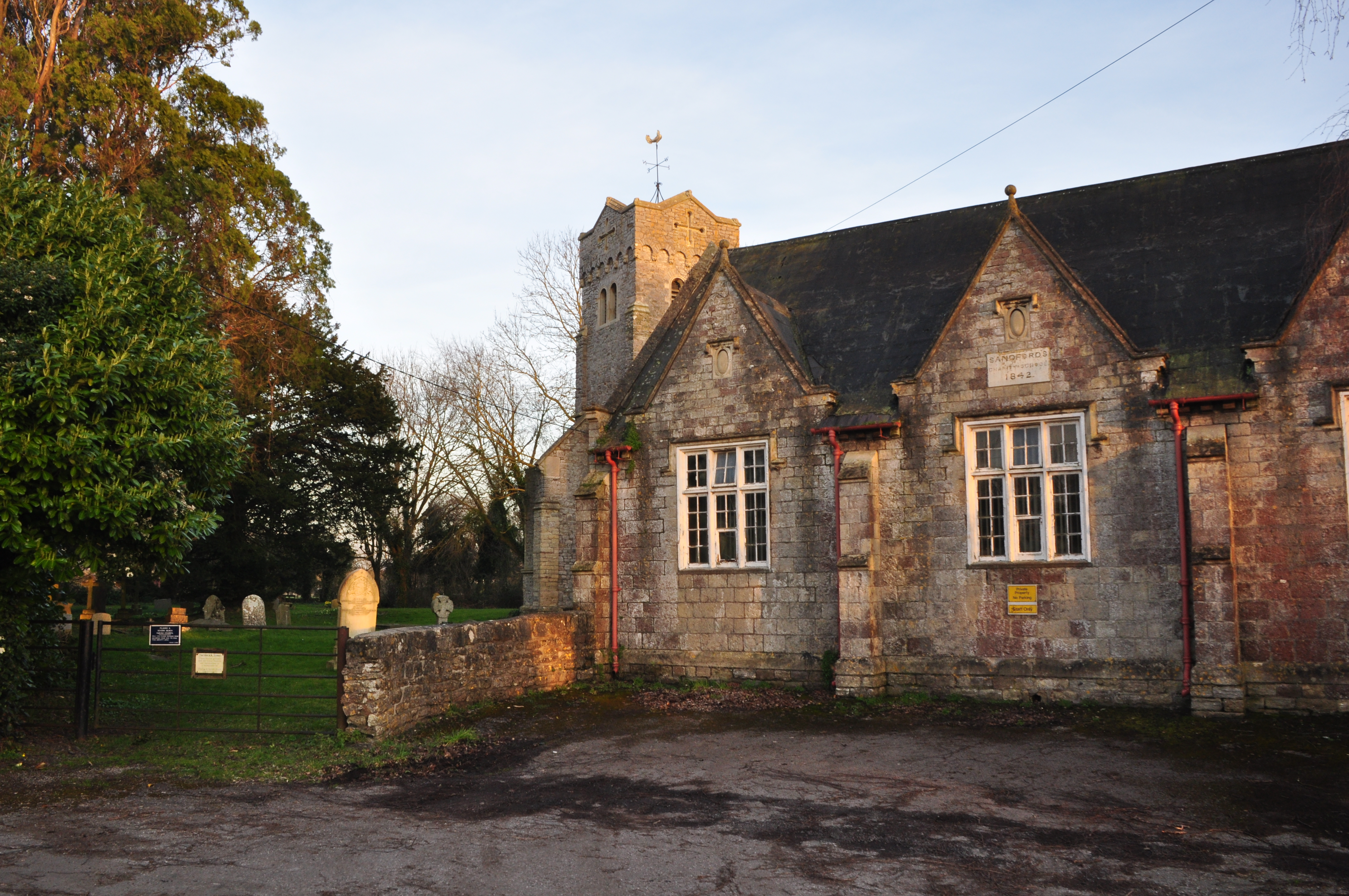
- School and St Thomas' Church Tower
- Interactive map of Northwick, South Gloucestershire
- Country: England

Northwick is a hamlet in South Gloucestershire, England, first mentioned in 955.

The hamlet lies on the River Severn, between Pilning and Aust. It was part of the tything of Northwick with Redwick in the ancient parish of Henbury. It is now in the parish of Pilning and Severn Beach.

The church of St Thomas was declared redundant in 1971.
