= Redwick, Gloucestershire =

Village in Gloucestershire, England

Coordinates: 51.56669°N 2.65°W

Redwick
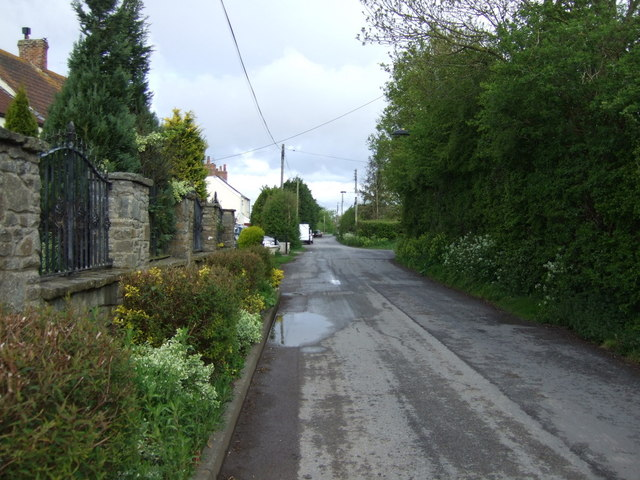

- Location within Gloucestershire
- OS grid reference: ST550858
- Civil parish: Pilning and Severn Beach
- Unitary authority: South Gloucestershire
- Ceremonial county: Gloucestershire
- Region: South West
- Country: England
- Sovereign state: United Kingdom
- Post town: Bristol
- Postcode district: BS35
- Dialling code: 01454
- Police: Avon and Somerset
- Fire: Avon
- Ambulance: South Western

Redwick is a village in South Gloucestershire, England. It is part of the parish of Pilning and Severn Beach, and is bounded by the River Severn to the north and the Chessell Pill Rhine to the east. To the south is the village of Pilning, at the end of Redwick Road near Pilning Stores and the village war memorial. Immediately to the west, the South Wales Main Line railway enters the Severn Tunnel.

Historically Redwick was, with Northwick, a tything of the parish of Henbury. The village was first mentioned in 955 under the name Hreodwican, meaning "place of reeds". The village is also mentioned in the Domesday Book in 1086.
