= Rangeworthy =

Village in Gloucestershire, England

Coordinates: 51°34′N 2°27′W

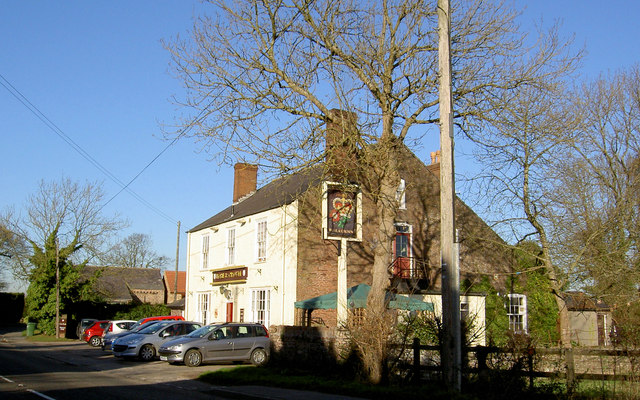
The Rose and Crown pub in Rangeworthy

Rangeworthy is a semi-rural farming village in South Gloucestershire, England, nearby communities include Falfield and Charfield. The village population taken at the 2011 census was 675.

The village lies between Iron Acton and Bagstone, along the B4058 road. It is a long village divided by a road with a well used village hall, pub, hotel, recreation ground, primary school and church. The Indian restaurant that was previously in Rangeworthy closed on October of 2025. A village committee organises village events including the children's Christmas party, Summer Fete and Beer Festival. There are other organisations such as the Court Players, Women's Institute, a Youth Club, Toddlers group and Parish magazine.

Several good public footpaths give access to the countryside & there are bridle paths for horse riders & cyclists.

Rangeworthy was historically a chapelry in the ancient parish of Thornbury, a detached part of that parish. It became a separate civil parish in 1866. The organist Charles Harford Lloyd served there in his youth.
