= Digitech Studio School =

Digitech Studio School Bristol

Location
- Tower Road North; Warmley, Gloucestershire, BS30 8XQ; England; 51.4558°N 2.4806°W

Information
- Type: Studio school
- Motto: Designing the Future
- Established: 2015
- Trust: Cabot Learning Federation
- Department for Education URN: 142079 Tables
- Ofsted: Reports
- Principal: Chris Ballard
- Executive Principal: Simon Jones
- Gender: Mixed
- Age: 14 to 19
- Capacity: 250 Approx.
- Houses: Kusama Picasso Banksy
- Colours: Purple, Orange, Blue
- Website: http://www.digitechstudioschool.co.uk

Digitech Studio School is the first studio school in the wider Bristol area. It opened in 2015 and moved to a new building in Warmley, Gloucestershire in 2016. It is part of the Cabot Learning Federation.

It takes students from 14 to 19 years old.

In 2017 Ofsted rated the school as "requiring improvement", but the school improved to "Good" by its next inspection in 2021.

In 2018 Partner college Boomsatsuma moved out of the Digitech building and into its own facilities
