= Downend, South Gloucestershire =

Residential suburb of Greater Bristol, England

Coordinates: 51.4947°N 2.5049°W

Downend
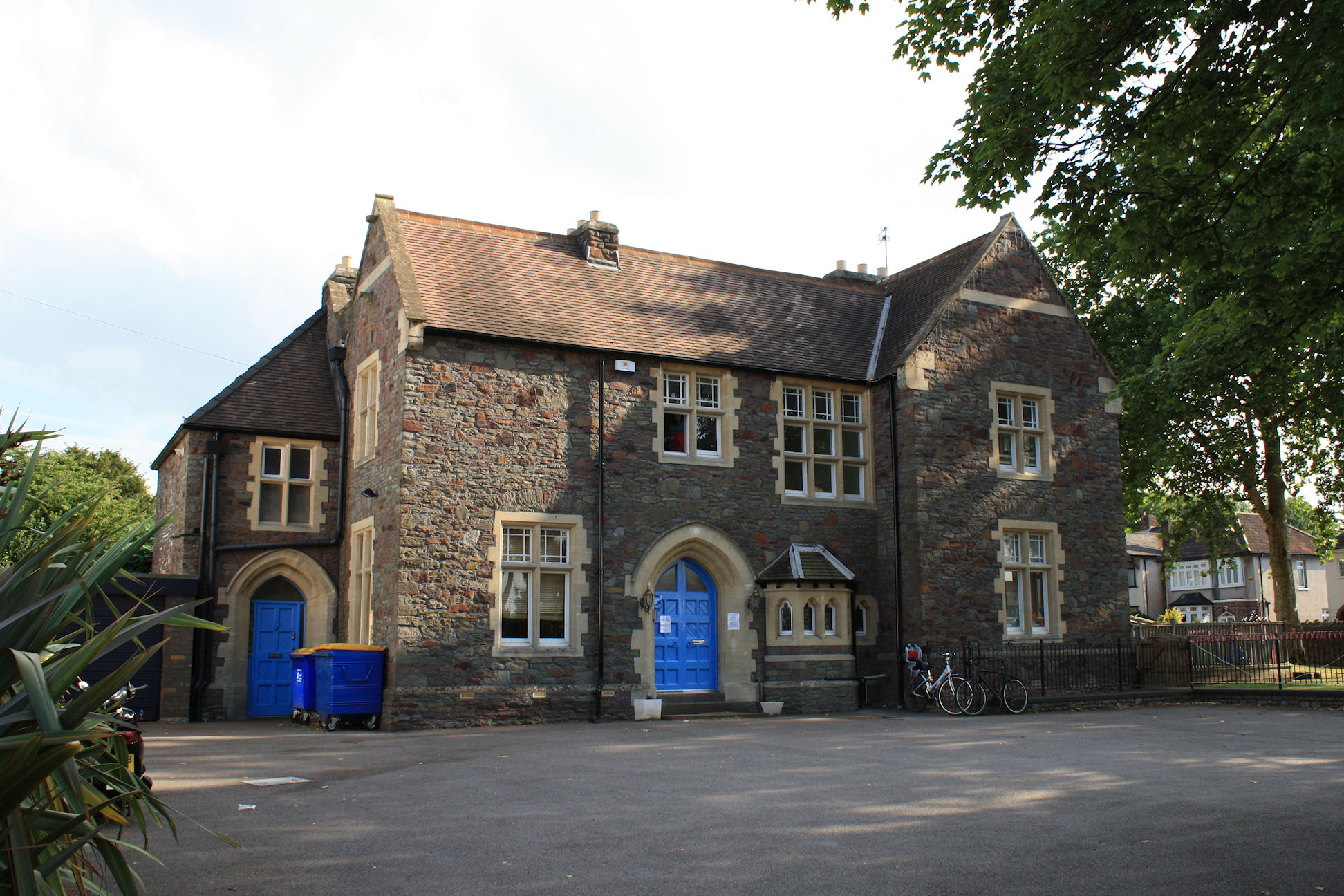
- The old vicarage, typical late-19th-century architecture of Downend

- Location within Gloucestershire
- Population: 12,716 (2021)
- OS grid reference: ST650774
- Civil parish: Downend and Bromley Heath
- Unitary authority: South Gloucestershire
- Ceremonial county: Gloucestershire
- Region: South West
- Country: England
- Sovereign state: United Kingdom
- Post town: BRISTOL
- Postcode district: BS16
- Dialling code: 0117
- Police: Avon and Somerset
- Fire: Avon
- Ambulance: South Western
- UK Parliament: Filton and Bradley Stoke

Downend is a residential suburb of Greater Bristol, England, the housing stock is typically terraced Victorian, 1930s and 1950s semi-detached and detached. It is in the South Gloucestershire local district, located to the northeast of Bristol and bordered by the Bristol City suburb of Fishponds, and the South Gloucestershire suburbs of Staple Hill, Frenchay, Mangotsfield, and Emersons Green. The community was formerly part of the parish of Mangotsfield. On 19 January 2020 The Sunday Times ran an article which named Downend as one of the UK's best suburbs.

Downend forms, with the suburb of Bromley Heath, the civil parish of Downend and Bromley Heath, created in 2003.

== Schools and Education ==
In the areas of Downend and Bromley heath, there are multiple schools. These are listed below:

- Downend Secondary School (Part of Pathway trust)
- Bromley Heath Junior School
- Bromley Heath Infants School
- Christ Church CofE Junior School
- Stanbridge Primary School
- St Augustine of Canterbury Catholic Primary School

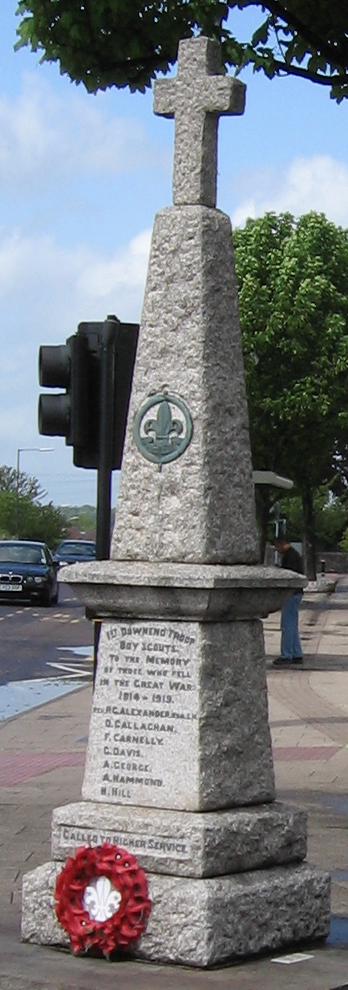
Downend war memorial

== Recognition ==
In January 2020, *The Sunday Times* included Downend in its list of the best suburbs to live in the United Kingdom.

== Governance ==
An electoral ward in the same name exists. The total population of the ward at the 2011 census was 10,785.

== Notable residents ==
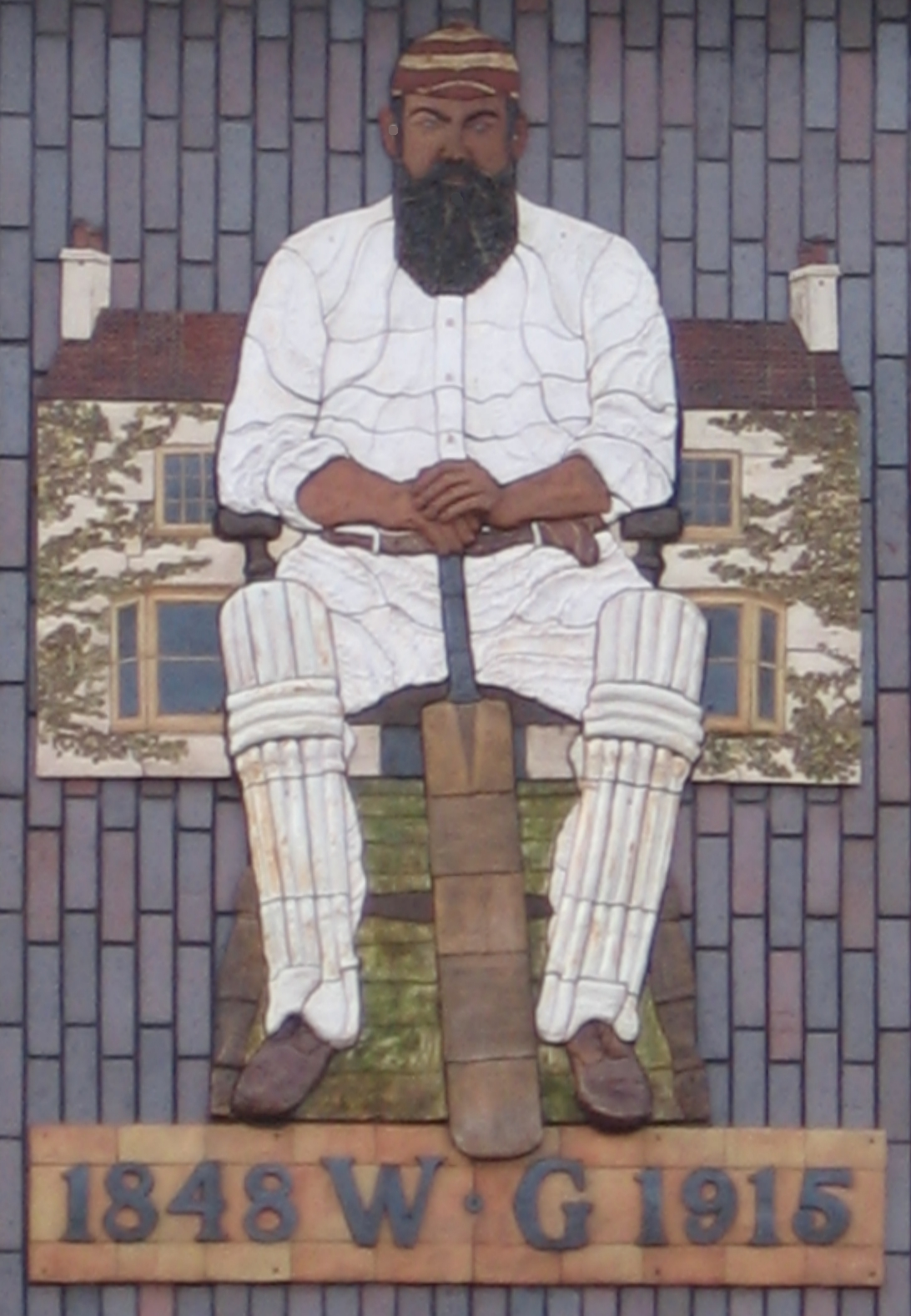
A mural of W. G. Grace in Downend

W. G. Grace, the cricketer, was born at Downend House on North Street. The house overlooks the ground of Downend Cricket Club.

Olympic bronze medal winner Jenny Jones (snowboarder) was also born in Downend.

Edward Hodges Baily sculptor of Nelson's column.

== See also ==
- Downend air crash
