= Rudgeway =

Village in Gloucestershire, England

Coordinates: 51.57814°N 2.54025°W

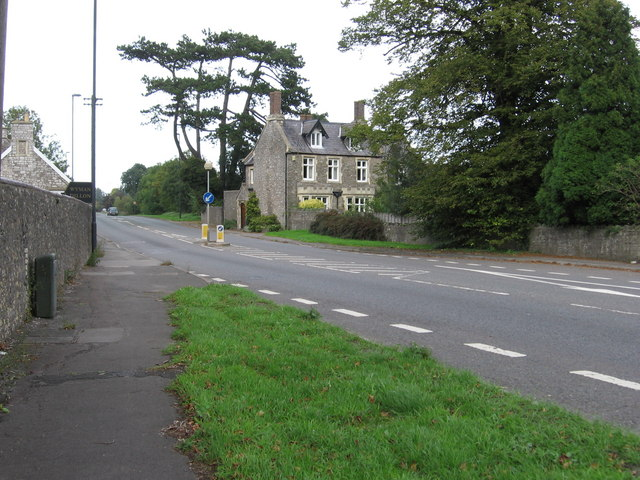
- The A38 road running through the southern end of Rudgeway

- Location within Gloucestershire
- Population: 593 (2015 estimate)
- OS grid reference: ST626867
- Unitary authority: South Gloucestershire
- Ceremonial county: Gloucestershire
- Region: South West
- Country: England
- Sovereign state: United Kingdom
- Post town: BRISTOL
- Postcode district: BS35
- Dialling code: 01454
- Police: Avon and Somerset
- Fire: Avon
- Ambulance: South Western
- UK Parliament: Thornbury and Yate

Rudgeway is a village in South Gloucestershire in south west England, located between Alveston and Almondsbury on the A38 trunk road. It lies west of Earthcott, Latteridge, Iron Acton and Yate on the B4059 road.

== Etymology ==
The name Rudgeway refers to a local section of Roman road known as the Ridge Way or Rudge Way which ran through it on the path now followed by the A38. The road started in what is now the Sea Mills area of Bristol, near the present-day site of Sea Mills railway station, and ran in a north-north-easterly direction via the Ridge Way section towards Gloucester. The name of the village has appeared on various documents throughout history as Rugewei (in 1191), Rugweye (1248), Rigweye (1276) and as both Rudgeway and Rudgewaye in 1587.

== The village ==
Rudgeway is located in the parish of Alveston and is spread out along the upper edge of the escarpment above the Severn floodplain on the A38 road. It lies approximately 1.75 miles (2.82 km) north of the Almondsbury Interchange between the villages of Almondsbury and Alveston, to the north of Bristol.

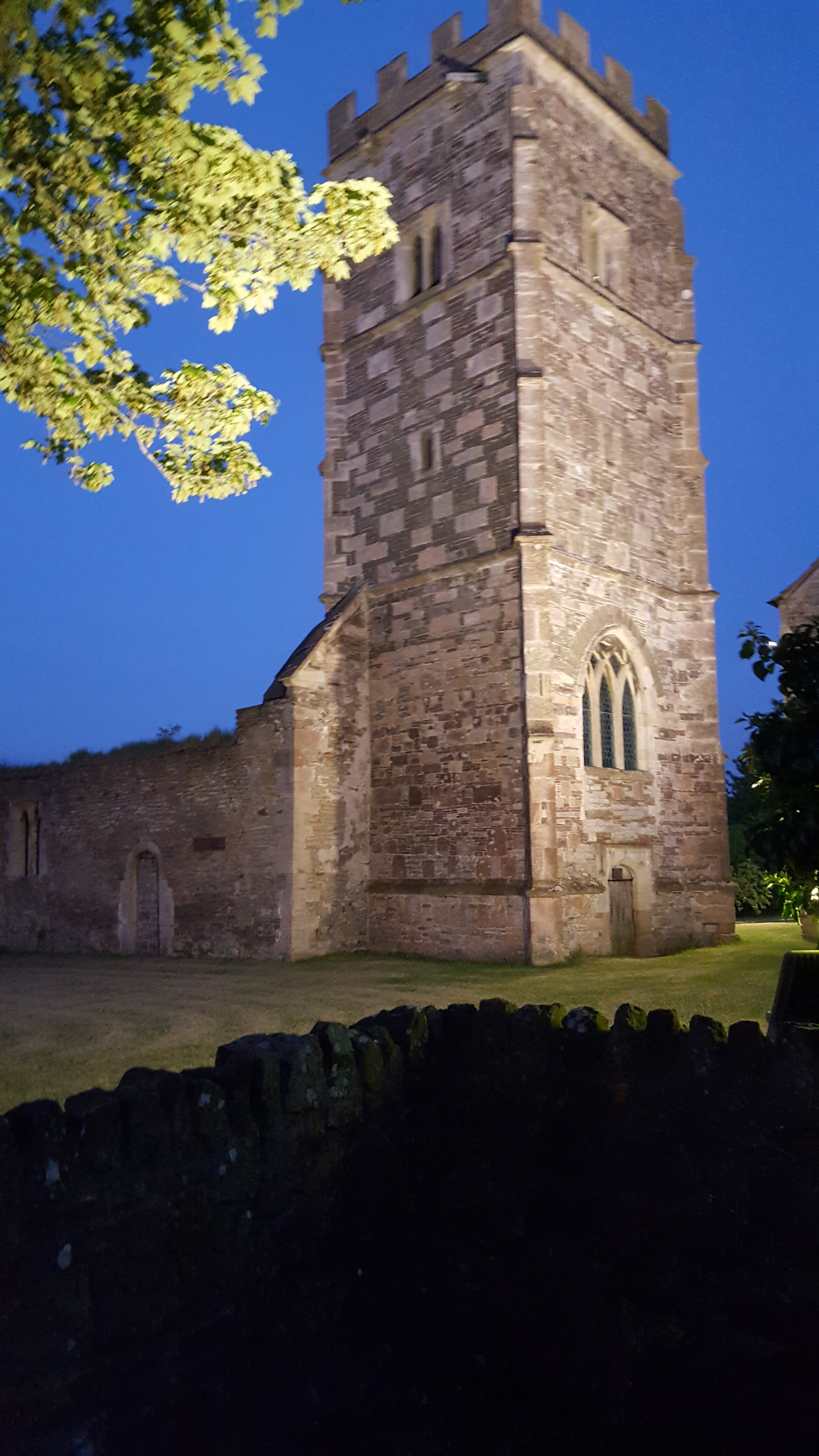
The remains of St Helen's Church

The village contains a small number of listed buildings, including the grade II-listed Old Church Farm. Formerly known as Alveston Manor, it was originally built as a house for the Veel family in the late 16th century and features their coat of arms above the front door along with the year 1634. By the end of the 18th century it was being used as a farmhouse and in 1960 the property was purchased by the aircraft engine manufacturer Bristol Siddeley, who were later purchased by and amalgamated into Rolls-Royce Limited. Rolls-Royce used the property as a conference centre and for visitors' accommodation until 2017 when it was bought from them and converted into a hotel.

Within the grounds of Old Church Farm is the ruin of St Helen's Church, which is also grade II-listed. All that remains of the building now is the tower and a portion of the nave wall. The remains of the church are also a scheduled monument.

The neighbouring Pypers estate also has a number of buildings and structures that are all grade II-listed. These include main house itself, originally built in the late 18th century with additions made in the 19th and 20th centuries and built in the classical style, the entrance gates and surrounding piers and walls, and the stables and adjacent wall and piers.

The only other listed building in Rudgeway is the Grade II Tockington Park Farmhouse. Built in the 17th century and extended in the nineteenth, its barn is said to contain a portion of Roman wall. A small former Methodist chapel, known as Ebenezer Chapel, was built in the village in 1896 and closed in 2001 and has since been converted into a private dwelling.

There is one pub in Rudgeway, The Masons Arms, which lies at the northern edge of the village on the A38 Gloucester Road.

The village was formerly home to Silverhill School, an independent preparatory school now based in Winterbourne. The establishment took its name from Silverhill Brake, the road on which it was located, and was based there from 1949 until 1992. Since 1994 the former school building, known as Silverhill, had been home to a market research and data processing company. In 2024 a new school called Castlefell School opened at the site of the old school buildings.

== Demographics ==
The village is split across two UK census Output Areas (numbered E00075103 and E00075104 by the Office for National Statistics) which combined were estimated to have a population of 593 in 2015. These output areas covered the village of Rudgeway as well as a few surrounding farms and isolated dwellings. It is an area of relatively low deprivation, with 2019 figures ranking the Lower Layer Super Output Area in which the village resides as the 21,849th most deprived neighbourhood out of the 32,844 in England in terms of Index of Multiple Deprivation, putting it in the 40% least deprived areas nationally. This was a big fall from 2015 when it was ranked 29,860th, putting it in the 10% least deprived areas of England.
