= South Gloucestershire =

Local government district in Gloucestershire, England

- Unitary authority area
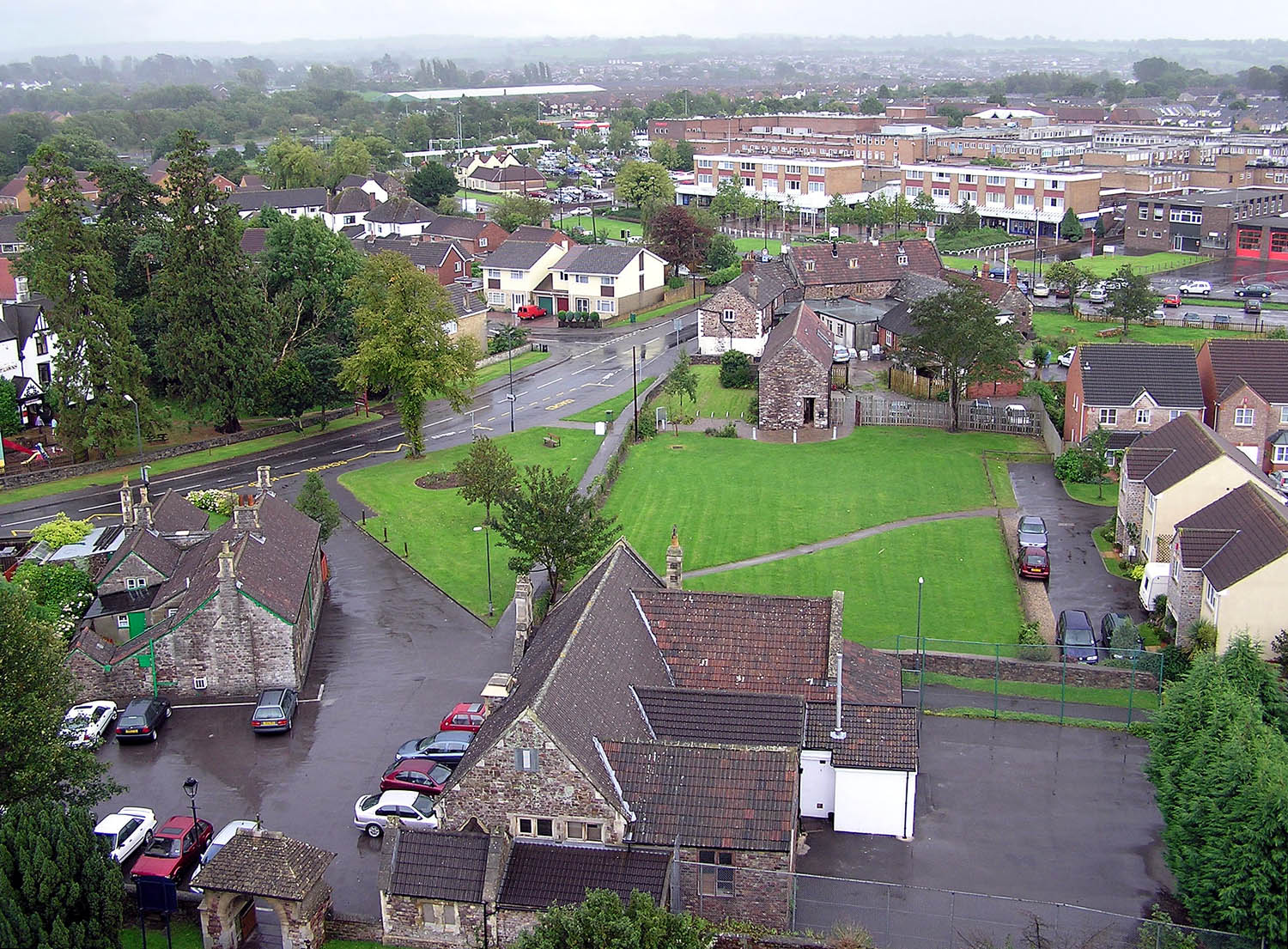
- Yate town skyline

- Shown within Gloucestershire
- Coordinates: 51°32′25″N 2°24′57″W
- Sovereign state: United Kingdom
- Constituent country: England
- Region: South West England
- Ceremonial County: Gloucestershire
- Combined authority: West of England
- Admin HQ: Yate

Government
  - Type: Unitary authority
  - Body: South Gloucestershire Council
  - Leadership: (No overall control)
  - MPs: Claire Hazelgrove (L); Damien Egan (L); Claire Young (LD); Dan Norris (I) (Note: Elected as a Labour MP; party whip suspended since April 2025.)

Area
  - Total: 191.87 sq mi (496.94 km^{2})
  - Rank: 78th (of 296)

Population (2024)
  - Total: 306,332
  - Rank: 49th (of 296)
  - Density: 1,596.6/sq mi (616.44/km^{2})

Ethnicity (2021)
  - Ethnic groups: List: 91.2% White; 3.8% Asian; 2.5% Mixed; 1.6% Black; 0.9% other

Religion (2021)
  - Religion: List: 46.1% no religion; 44.1% Christianity; 8.2% other; 1.6% Islam
- Time zone: UTC0 (GMT)
  - Summer (DST): UTC+1 (BST)
- ISO 3166: GB-SGC
- ONS code: 00HD (ONS) E06000025 (GSS)
- OS grid reference: ST735757
- Police: Avon and Somerset
- Fire: Avon
- Ambulance: South Western
- Website: southglos.gov.uk

South Gloucestershire is a unitary authority area in the ceremonial county of Gloucestershire, South West England. The majority of its population lies in the towns and villages of the Greater Bristol urban area surrounding the city of Bristol, including Kingswood, Staple Hill, Warmley, Filton, Patchway, Bradley Stoke, Longwell Green, Mangotsfield and Emersons Green. It is also home to standalone towns including Yate, Chipping Sodbury, and Thornbury.

South Gloucestershire was created in 1996 to replace the Northavon district and Borough of Kingswood of the abolished county of Avon. It is separate from Gloucestershire County Council, but is part of the ceremonial county and shares Gloucestershire's Lord Lieutenant (the Sovereign's representative to the county). Because of its history as part of the county of Avon, South Gloucestershire works closely with the other unitary authorities that took over when that county was abolished, including shared services such as Avon Fire and Rescue Service and Avon and Somerset Police, together with co-operation in planning strategy for transport, roads and housing.

== History ==
Prior to the implementation of the Local Government Act 1972 on 1 April 1974, the area that now forms South Gloucestershire formed part of the shire county of Gloucestershire, comprising the urban districts of Kingswood and Mangotsfield and the Rural Districts of Warmley, Sodbury and Thornbury. However, under the terms of that act, the area was removed from Gloucestershire, and became part of the county of Avon, forming the districts of Kingswood and Northavon.

In 1996, the county of Avon was abolished, and South Gloucestershire was created as a unitary authority area comprising the former districts of Kingswood and Northavon. The area borders the city and county of Bristol, the Bath and North East Somerset unitary authority area, and the shire counties of Gloucestershire and Wiltshire.

The geographic area currently known as South Gloucestershire should not be confused with Southern Gloucestershire. Nor should organisations or bodies in the past titled 'South Gloucestershire' (meaning Southern Gloucestershire) be confused with the area covered by the unitary authority.

== Demographics ==
=== Population ===
At the 2001 census, the population of South Gloucestershire was 245,641.

At the 2011 census, the population had increased to 262,767.

At the 2021 census, the population estimate for South Gloucestershire is 290,400.

=== Age ===
According to Government data, the population of 25-34 year olds in South Gloucestershire has increased by 1.7% between 2011 and 2021. There has been a decrease in the population of under-4 year-olds and 10-19 year-olds between the 2011 Census and the 2021 Census.

Population by age in South Gloucestershire
Age group	Population percentage in the 2011 Census	Population percentage in the 2021 Census	Percentage change (%)
0 to 4 years	6.1%	5.6%	-0.5%
5 to 9 years	5.6%	5.9%	+0.3%
10 to 15 years	7.4%	6.8%	-0.6%
16 to 19 years	5.4%	4.5%	-0.9%
20 to 24 years	5.9%	6.2%	+0.3%
25 to 34 years	12.0%	13.7%	+1.7%
35 to 49 years	22.6%	19.2%	-3.4%
50 to 64 years	18.3%	19.4%	+1.1%
65 to 74 years	9.1%	9.5%	+0.4%
75 to 84 years	5.6%	6.6%	+1.0%
85 years and over	2.1%	2.6%	+0.5%

=== Ethnic Groups ===
According to the 2001 census estimates, 97.6 percent of the population was described as white, 0.8 percent as dual heritage, 0.7 percent as Asian or Asian British, 0.4 percent as Black or Black British and 0.5 percent as Chinese or other.

Much of the population is in towns that form the 'suburbs' to the north and east of Bristol. There are also the large towns of Yate and its neighbour Chipping Sodbury, Thornbury, the large villages of Winterbourne and Frampton Cotterell, Wickwar, Alveston, Olveston and Tockington.

== Economy ==
The main employers are the local authority with 9,500 people and the Ministry of Defence Headquarters for Defence Procurement and the Naval Support Command with 7,000 employees. Other key employers include Airbus, Rolls-Royce and the Royal Mail, which dominates the Filton-Patchway area of South Gloucestershire. Friends Provident and Hewlett-Packard also have major offices in nearby Stoke Gifford.

Many employers operate in the heavily developed area between the northern edge of Bristol and the M5 motorway, an area sometimes described as the North Fringe of Bristol. This includes the Cribbs Causeway shopping centre, comprising The Mall regional shopping centre and the surrounding retail parks. East of Patchway are the Aztec West and Almondsbury business parks either side of the A38, extending to Bradley Stoke and the M4/M5 Almondsbury Interchange. Employers with sites in this area include EE and the RAC.

== Education ==
South Gloucestershire is home to 99 primary schools, 16 secondary schools, and post-16 colleges and centres. There is one university, the University of the West of England, which was a former polytechnic. In 2008, DCSF figures revealed that there was a 6.6% overall absence in the district's secondary schools, whilst 7.4% is the national average.

Key Stage 4 results (2008)	5 or more grades A*-C including English and maths GCSEs %	Level 2 in functional English and maths	Level 1 in functional English and maths	Level 2 (5 or more grades A*-C)	Level 1 (5 or more grades A*-G)	2 grades A*-C which cover the Key Stage 4 science programme of study	A*C in a modern foreign language	A*G in a modern foreign language	At least one qualification
Local Authority average	48.1%	56.9%	92.8%	63.6%	93.0%	50.3%	30.6%	49.7%	98.0%
England average	48.1%	52.0%	90.2%	65.3%	91.6%	50.3%	30.7%	44.8%	98.6%

In 2005, the then Chancellor of the Exchequer recognised the City of Bristol's ties to science and technology by naming it one of six "science cities", and promising funding for further development of science in the city, with a £300 million science park planned at Emersons Green, in South Gloucestershire.

== Media ==
The area is served by BBC West and ITV West Country broadcasting from the Mendip TV transmitter.

Radio stations for the area are:

BBC Local Radio

- BBC Radio Bristol

Independent Radio

- Heart West
- Greatest Hits Radio Bristol & The South West
- Hits Radio Bristol
- Kiss

Community Radio

- BCfm
- Thornbury Radio (formerly Gloss FM)
- Bradley Stoke Radio

== Geography ==
The River Severn forms the north-western edge of the area, with a wide coastal plain terminated by an escarpment. East of this is the wide River Frome Valley drainage area. Further east is another escarpment running roughly north–south, passing between Yate and Chipping Sodbury and west of Pucklechurch. The Cotswolds Escarpment forms the eastern edge of South Gloucestershire, while the western half is mainly urbanised.

A small part of the Cotswolds and the National Trust site of Dyrham Park are also in the district. South of the motorways are suburbs of Bristol while areas north are rural. Some of the inner green belts have been taken away by developments like the new town of Bradley Stoke.

== Transport ==
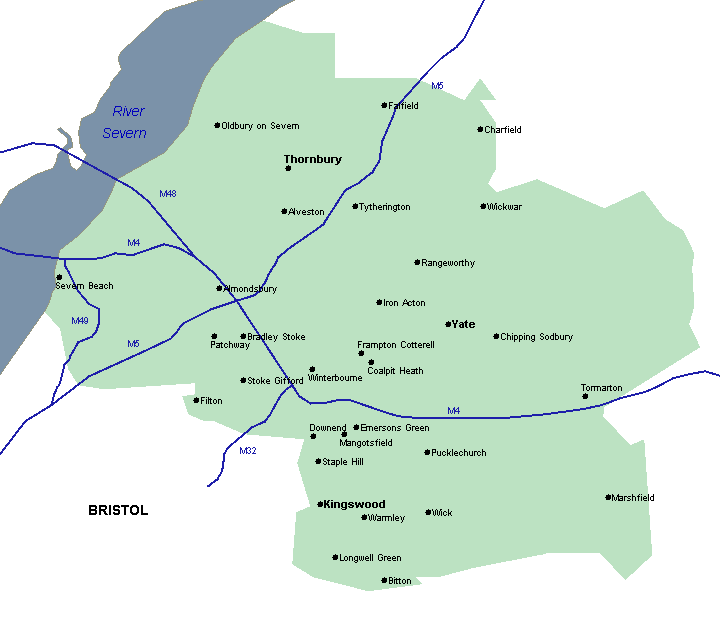
Map of South Gloucestershire; the blue lines are motorways

Many areas of South Gloucestershire have easy commuting access to Bristol (via the A38 and M32) and to Bath, as well as westward to South Wales and Cardiff via the two Severn bridges. The M5 and M4 motorways provide access to Gloucester and London. Bristol's northern and eastern ring road, the A4174, passes through South Gloucestershire. The Metrobus express bus network extends from Bristol into South Gloucestershire, and is supported by the district council.

The area also has an important and well used railway network, with many direct routes to towns and cities across the UK. This includes eastward to London and westward through the Severn Tunnel to Cardiff and the rest of South Wales. There are also routes to the South-West counties and north to England's second city, Birmingham. Many routes cross in Stoke Gifford at Bristol Parkway station. There are six stations within the district, mainly located near the border with Bristol in the west of the district.

Mode of transport in 2001	South Glos %	National %
Car driver	65.4	55.2
On foot	7.3	10.0
Bus or coach	6.5	7.4
Car passenger	6.3	6.3
Bicycle	3.0	2.8
Motorcycle	1.8	1.1
Train	0.6	4.1
Taxi	0.2	0.5
Other	0.3	0.5
Work from home	8.5	9.2

== Settlements ==
- Kingswood 40,734
- Bradley Stoke 27,805
- Yate 27,603
- Thornbury 12,342
- Stoke Gifford 11,509
- Patchway 10,465
- Filton 9,861

=== Other towns and villages ===
- Abson, Acton Turville, Almondsbury, Alveston, Aust, Awkley
- Badminton, Bagstone, Beach, Bitton, Bridgeyate
- Cadbury Heath, Catbrain, Charfield, Cheswick, Charlton (former village), Charlton Hayes, Chipping Sodbury, Churchend, Coalpit Heath, Codrington, Cold Ashton, Compton Greenfield, Conham, Cowhill, Cromhall
- Dodington, Downend, Doynton, Duckhole, Dunkirk, Dyrham
- Earthcott, Easter Compton, Elberton, Emersons Green, Engine Common
- Falfield, Frampton Cotterell, Frenchay
- Gaunt's Earthcott
- Hallen, Hambrook, Hanham, Harry Stoke, Hawkesbury, Hawkesbury Upton, Hill, Hinton, Horton
- Ingst, Iron Acton, Itchington
- Latteridge, Little Badminton, Little Sodbury, Little Stoke, Littleton-upon-Severn, Longwell Green
- Mangotsfield, Marshfield, Milbury Heath, Upper and Lower Morton
- Nibley, Northwick
- Oldbury Naite, Oldbury-on-Severn, Old Down, Oldland, Oldland Common, Old Sodbury, Olveston, Over
- Pilning, Pennsylvania, Petty France, Pucklechurch
- Rangeworthy, Redwick, Rockhampton, Rudgeway
- Severn Beach, Shepperdine, Siston, Soundwell, Staple Hill, Swineford
- Tockington, Tormarton, Tortworth, Tytherington
- Upton Cheyney
- Wapley, Warmley, West Littleton, Westerleigh, Whitfield, Wick, Wickwar, Willsbridge, Winterbourne

== Places of interest ==
- Avon Valley Railway
- Cribbs Causeway and The Mall
- Aerospace Bristol – aviation and space museum, Concorde among the exhibits
- Severn Way
- The Severn crossings
- Thornbury Castle
- Bristol Zoo Project

== Democracy ==
The Conservatives held an overall majority on the council from 2015 until 2023; previously no party had overall control, except for 1999–2003 when the Liberal Democrats had a majority. After the 2023 elections, Labour and the Liberal Democrats formed a coalition which took control of the council, this being Labour's first time in control and the Liberal Democrats for the first time in twenty years.

In 2012, it became one of the first authorities in the UK to return to a Committee System, abolishing the single party Cabinet, as allowed under the Localism Act. This was later reverted to a leader and cabinet system in 2017 during the Conservative majority.

For Westminster elections, the area is covered by three constituencies, all lying within the authority boundary. These are:

- Thornbury and Yate (county)
- Filton and Bradley Stoke (county)
- Kingswood (borough)

County/Borough is a legal term denoting the type of constituency. County is a rural area, Borough is an urban area.
