= Tytherington =

Tytherington may refer to:

== Places in England ==
- Tytherington, Cheshire, an area in the north of Macclesfield
  - Tytherington School, Macclesfield
- Tytherington, Gloucestershire, a village in south Gloucestershire
  - Tytherington Rocks F.C., a football club in the village
  - Tytherington railway station, a former railway station
- Tytherington, Wiltshire, a small village in Wiltshire

== See also ==
- Tytherington Down, a site of significant scientific interest in Wiltshire
- Tytherington Old Hall, a former country house in Macclesfield
- Tytherington Quarry, a site of significant scientific interest in south Gloucestershire
