= Wickwar =

Village in South Gloucestershire, England

Coordinates: 51.595°N 2.398°W

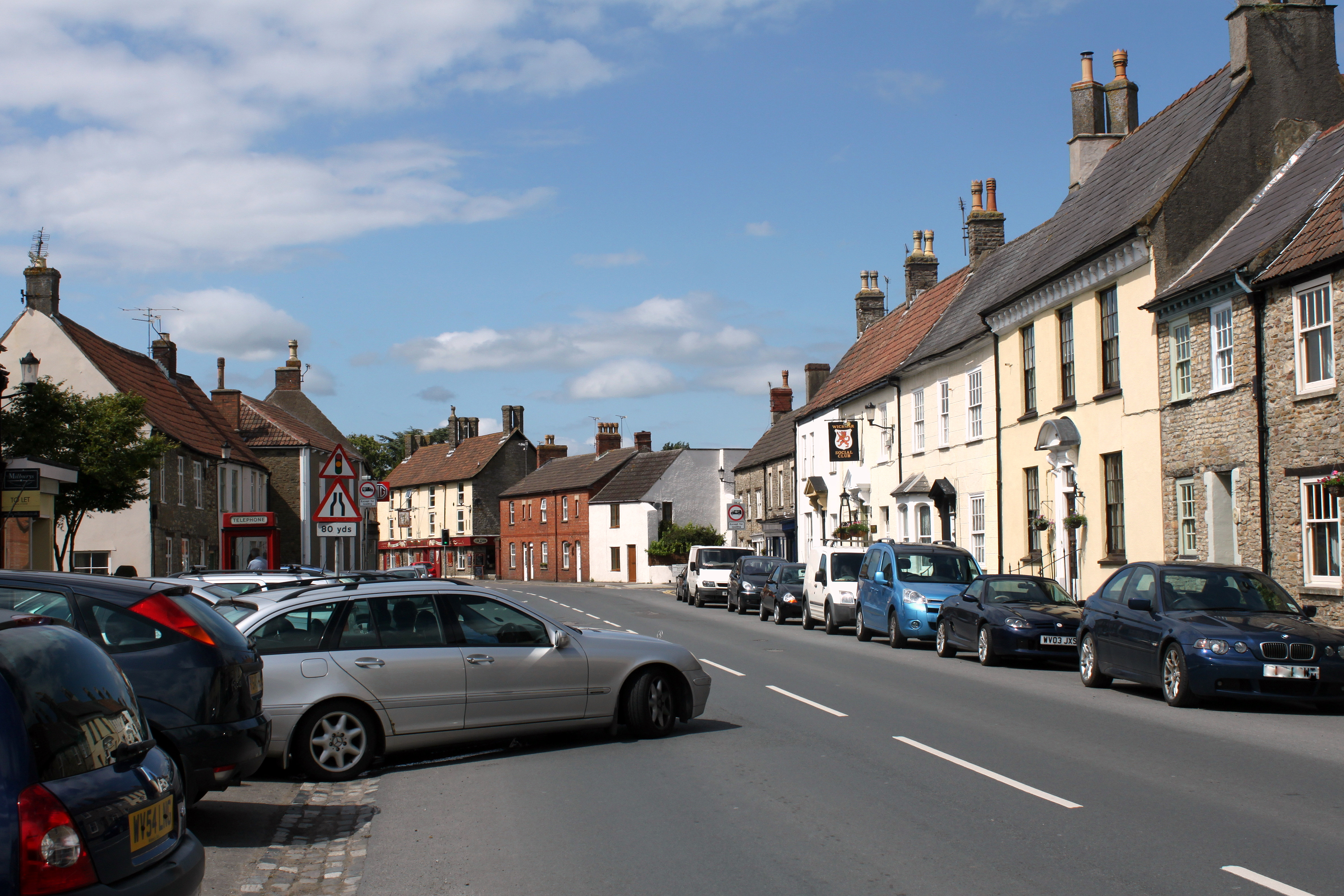
- Wickwar High Street

- Location within Gloucestershire
- Population: 2,083 (2021 census)
- OS grid reference: ST7288
- Civil parish: Wickwar
- Unitary authority: South Gloucestershire
- Ceremonial county: Gloucestershire
- Region: South West
- Country: England
- Sovereign state: United Kingdom
- Post town: WOTTON-UNDER-EDGE
- Postcode district: GL12
- Dialling code: 01454
- Police: Avon and Somerset
- Fire: Avon
- Ambulance: South Western
- UK Parliament: Thornbury and Yate

Wickwar is a village and civil parish in Gloucestershire, England, located between Yate and Charfield. At the 2021 census, the parish had a population of 2,083.

== History ==
Wickwar was mentioned in the Domesday Book of 1086, where it appears as "Wichen", from the Old English (aet) wicum, meaning "(at) the dwellings". The manor was given to John la Warre by King John and was held by Roger la Warre in 1285, when it was referred to as "Warre Wyke". Warre is a Norman family name which gave its name to Wickwar.

The village lay on the Old Saltway from Droitwich to Old Sodbury and Pucklechurch, and was developed in the 13th century by the de la Warre family with the establishment of a market in 1285. The main street, the present High Street, was laid out around the market place with uniform burgage plots and rear access lanes. Burghers paid an annual fixed rent to the overlord and they carried on trades and crafts which, together with their property rights, distinguished them from the feudal peasant. Livestock were often kept on the burgage plots behind the house, and this necessitated the rear access lane.

The original settlement of Wickwar was located around the church and Poole Court, a 16th-century Manor House demolished in the 19th century, to the north of the village. All that remains of the Manor is its terraced garden, south-west of the church.

The parish church of the Holy Trinity is set on a small hill and is of 12th-century origin. At the northern edge of the village, it is reached by a raised footpath called the Stank, meaning "dam" – there were fish ponds here until the 19th century. It was extensively remodelled in the 14th and 15th centuries and was restored c.1881 by W L Bernard. Inside there is a sculpture of St John the Baptist dated 1496, which was originally housed at Poole Court. It is a Grade II* listed building.

To the north of the church, within the churchyard is the Sunday School, built in 1837 in a Gothic Revival style. The churchyard also has a number of chest tombs, which represent a collection of local and classical tomb forms.

The High Street has a collection of mostly 18th-century fronted, rendered or stuccoed houses, including Albert House and the Police station. The Town Hall c.1795 has arched openings and a bellcote with pinnacle. The Town Hall clock mechanism is thought to date from 1660.

The village is on the main Bristol–Birmingham railway line, and once had a station, but this was closed in January 1965. The village also used to have a shop and brewery which also closed in 2018 and 2020 respectively, leaving the village without any shops. There is also Wickwar Social Club, which is open to members only.

In April 2020, after hostility from the local area, a new home development in the village was targeted in a suspected arson attack, severely damaging a partially completed property.

Spherules are found lying unconformably over Carboniferous limestone in Wickwar Quarry. These are possibly tektite deposits, formed as molten material ejected by a meteorite impact that may have fallen back to Earth.

== Governance ==
The village is part of "Ladden Brook" electoral ward. This ward stretches south east to Iron Acton and east to Tytherington. The total population of the ward taken from the 2011 census was 3,858.

== Recent events ==
=== 1987 gas explosion ===
On the morning of 9 January 1987, a gas pipe running underneath the High Street exploded, demolishing a house and damaging others nearby. However, an off-duty policeman returning from a late-night game of backgammon smelt the gas and raised the alarm, evacuating the street before the explosion. His house was destroyed, and others significantly damaged, but no-one was harmed. As he said at the time, had he been in bed at the usual time, it would have been far worse.

As a result of the explosion, a ban on heavy vehicles was introduced throughout the village, as it was thought that frequent use of the road by lorries, coupled with freezing weather conditions, had caused the 1950s pipes to break.

=== Geronimo the Alpaca ===
In August 2021, the farm owned by Helen Macdonald in Wickwar became the focal point of a controversial decision by DEFRA to kill an alpaca named Geronimo after the animal tested positive for bovine tuberculosis. On 31 August it was confirmed that the animal had been "euthanised" by staff from the Animal and Plant Health Agency (APHA).
