= Thornbury (Gloucestershire) railway station =

Former railway station in England

Coordinates: 51.6050°N 2.5249°W

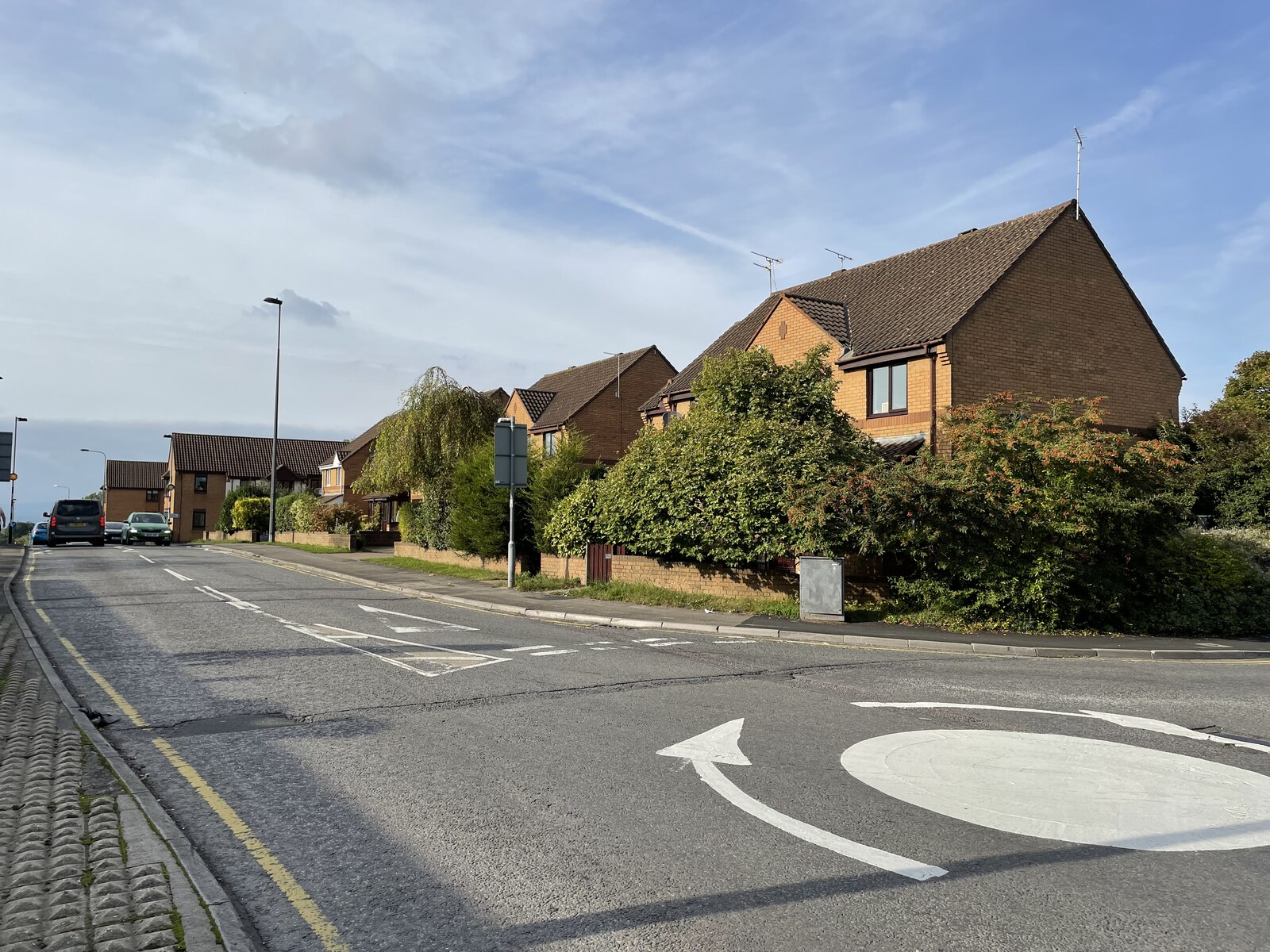
The site of the station in 2021

Thornbury railway station served the town of Thornbury in Gloucestershire. The station was the terminus of a short 7 1/2-mile (12.1 km) branch from Yate on the Midland Railway's line between Bristol and Gloucester.

== History ==
The station was designed by the Midland Railway company architect John Holloway Sanders. It opened in 1872 with two trains in each direction a day, both connecting at Yate with trains on the mainline. Later trains appear to have run through to and from Bristol Temple Meads, though the service was never frequent. In 1910, there were four trains in each direction on week-days.

Thornbury station appears to have been badly affected by the rise of industrial development in the Patchway and Filton areas that were not accessible from the railway, but could be reached using cheaper road services to Patchway railway station and Great Western Railway trains from there.

The station at Thornbury had a large double-roomed terminus building. The single platform was on the north side and there was a run-round loop. Sidings occupied the land opposite the platform, and there were goods facilities for handling livestock beyond the platforms towards the terminal buffers. The station had a basic wooden engine shed, turntable, goods shed, water tower and a substantial station master's house.

Thornbury station was an early casualty to rail closure, and passenger services ceased in 1944, though passengers to and from the US military hospital at Leyhill, now a prison, continued later. It remained open for goods traffic until 1966 and was used extensively in the construction of the first Severn road bridge and the Oldbury Power Station. Even after Thornbury closed, a section of the branch remained open for quarry traffic to Tytherington Quarry. At Thornbury, the station buildings were demolished and are now the site of a Tesco supermarket.

From the 1990s onwards various proposals have been made for reopening the line to Thornbury as part of a Bristol/South Gloucestershire suburban rail network, most recently in a consultation report produced by Halcrow Group in 2012, as well as the November 2015 joint transport study report produced by The West of England Local Enterprise Partnership.

== Services ==
Preceding station	Disused railways	Following station
Tytherington; Line and station closed	Yate to Thornbury Branch; Midland Railway	Terminus
