= Iron Acton railway station =

Former railway station in England

Iron Acton
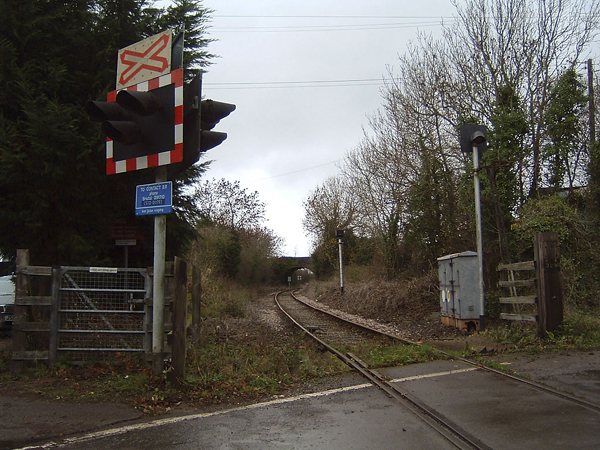
- The site of Iron Acton railway station in 2004

General information
- Location: Iron Acton, South Gloucestershire; England
- Coordinates: 51.5477°N 2.4690°W
- Grid reference: ST675833
- Platforms: 1

Other information
- Status: Disused

History
- Original company: Midland Railway
- Pre-grouping: Midland Railway
- Post-grouping: London, Midland and Scottish Railway

Key dates
- 2 September 1872: Station opened
- 19 June 1944: Station closed
Location

Iron Acton station opened on 2 September 1872, with the start of services on the Midland Railway Thornbury branch line from Yate to Thornbury. The station was designed by the Midland Railway company architect John Holloway Sanders.

It closed to passenger services on 19 June 1944.

The station served Iron Acton village and was sited to the south west of it. It consisted of a single platform face and a large wooden station building. A freight-only branch serving an iron mine in Frampton Cotterell connected at the station. This closed in 1872 and a truncated section of this route served as a coal depot until closure on 10 June 1963.

The station was demolished in the 1960s. The part-remains of the platform survive, as does a crossing-keeper's cottage to the south of the station site.

In mid 2013, the line beyond Yate Middle Jn was placed 'Out of Use', due to the mothballing of the Tytherington Quarry. However the line has since reopened with the resumption of quarry traffic.

== Services ==
Preceding station	Disused railways	Following station
Yate	Yate to Thornbury Branch; Midland Railway	Tytherington; Station closed
