= Tytherington railway station =

Former station in Gloucestershire, England

Coordinates: 51.5907°N 2.4796°W

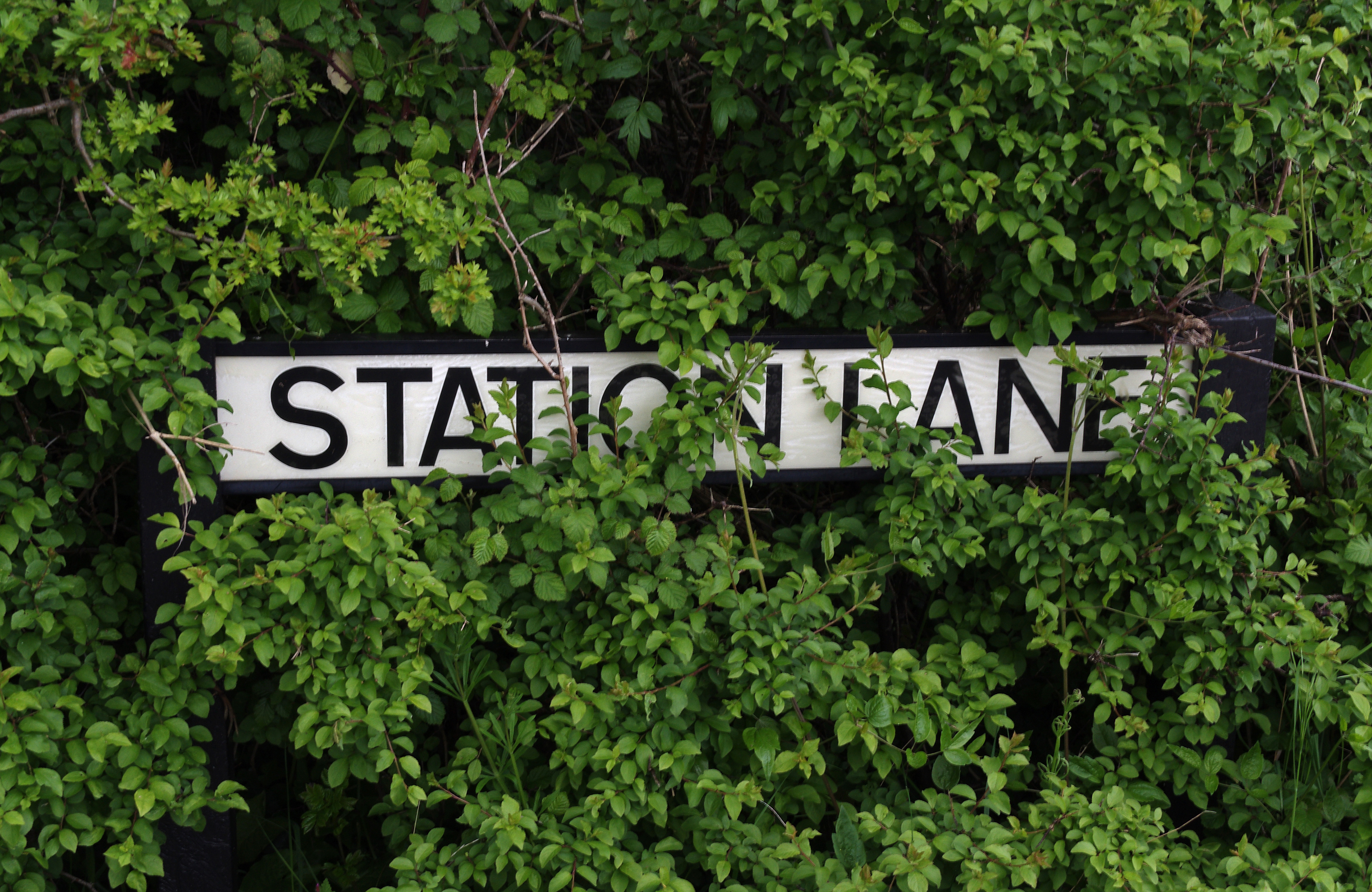
The road name is one of the only indications of the station.

Tytherington railway station served the village of Tytherington in South Gloucestershire. The station was on the Yate to Thornbury branch line that was opened by the Midland Railway in 1872. The station was designed by the Midland Railway company architect John Holloway Sanders.

Tytherington was a small station with a single platform on a single track section of the line. There was a single-storey wooden building. The station was closed to passengers with the rest of the line in 1944, but remained open for goods traffic until 1963. In mid 2013, the line beyond Yate Middle Jn was signed 'Out of Use' by Network Rail due to the quarry being mothballed and rail traffic having ceased.. The line has since been reinstated with regular freight workings from Tytherington Quarry to Calvert and Didcot

The station building has now been demolished, but the station master's house remains in residential use.

== Services ==
Preceding station	Disused railways	Following station
Iron Acton; Station closed	Yate and Thornbury Branch; Midland Railway	Thornbury; Station closed
