= Midland Railway Class 3 4-4-0 =

Class of British steam locomotives

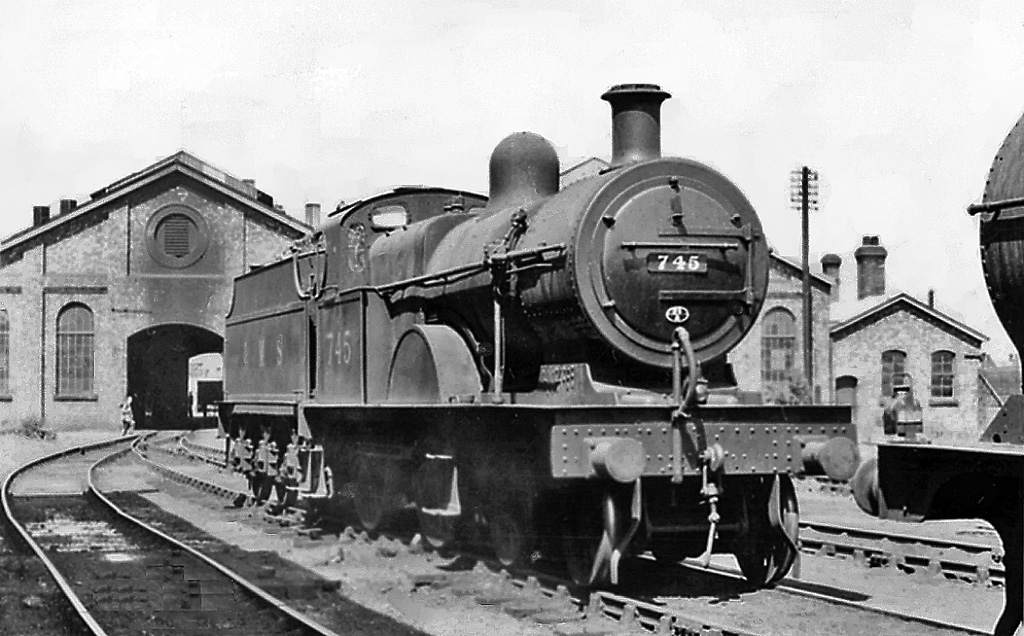
- 745 at Bourneville (Birmingham) Locomotive Depot, July 1947
Type and origin
- Power type: Steam
- Designer: Samuel W. Johnson
- Builder: Derby Works
- Build date: 1900–1905
- Total produced: 80
Specifications
- Configuration
  - Whyte: 4-4-0
  - UIC: 2′B n2 → 2′B h2
- Gauge: 4 ft 8 1/2 in (1,435 mm)
- Leading dia.: First ten: 3 ft 6 1/2 in (1.080 m); Remainder: 3 ft 3 1/2 in (1.003 m)
- Driver dia.: 6 ft 9 in (2.057 m)
- Loco weight: 53 long tons 0 cwt (118,700 lb or 53.9 t)
- Fuel type: Coal
- Water cap.: 3,500–4,500 imp gal (16,000–20,000 L; 4,200–5,400 US gal)
- Cylinders: Two, inside
- Cylinder size: Original: 19 1/2 in × 26 in (495 mm × 660 mm); Rebuilt: 20 1/2 in × 26 in (521 mm × 660 mm)
Career
- Operators: Midland Railway; → London, Midland and Scottish Railway; → British Railways
- Power class: MR: 3; LMS/BR: 3P
- Withdrawn: 1925–1926 (7); 1928 (1); 1935–1953
- Disposition: All scrapped

The Midland Railway Class 3 4-4-0 was a series of 80 steam engines built by the Midland railway at the Derby locomotive works between 1900 and 1905.

They were designed for express passenger trains, earlier types not being powerful enough for the new heavier trains. They were the first of that railway's engines to be built new with Belpaire fireboxes, and the engines were generally known as "Belpaires".

== Overview ==
There were only minor differences between the four groups. All had 6 ft 9 in driving wheels with inside cylinders of 19½ in diameter with 26 in stroke. Seventy-three received type G8AS superheated boilers between 1913 and 1926. The remaining 7 continued in service with non-superheated boilers.

== Accidents and incidents ==
- On 13 October, 1928, locomotive No. 714 of the class was hauling a night mail train from Leeds to Bristol, when it failed to stop at a signal near Charfield railway station. It collided with a freight train, which was hauled by GWR 4300 Class no. 6381. Another freight train, hauled by an 0-6-0 on the opposite line, was partially derailed. In total, 16 people were killed and 41 people were injured. No. 714 was scrapped as a result of the accident.

== Disposal ==
The 7 non-superheated locomotives were withdrawn in 1925/6. No. 714, was destroyed in the Charfield railway disaster of October 1928 and the remainder withdrawn between 1935 and 1953. None has been preserved.

== Numbering ==
Original numbers	Post-1907 numbers	Year built	Boiler
2606–2610, 800–804	700–709	1900–1901	GX - 175 psi
2781–2790, 810–839	710–749	1902–1904	G8 - 180 psi
840–849	750–759	1904	G8 - 180 psi
850–869	760–779	1904–1905	G8A - 200 psi

== Sources ==
- Baxter, Bertram (1982). Baxter, David (ed.). British Locomotive Catalogue 1825–1923. Vol. 3A: Midland Railway and its constituent companies. Ashbourne, Derbyshire: Moorland Publishing Company. ISBN 9780903485524.
- Cook, A.F. (2000). Raising Steam on the LMS: The Evolution of LMS Locomotive Boilers. RCTS. ISBN 978-0901115850.
- Bob Essery and David Jenkinson An Illustrated Review of Midland Locomotives from 1883 (Didcot, Oxon: Wild Swan Publications)
  - Vol. 2 – Passenger tender classes (1988) ISBN 0-906867-59-2
- Gerard, Malcolm; Hamilton, J.A.B. (1981) [1967]. Trains to Nowhere. London: George Allen & Unwin. ISBN 0-04-385084-7.
- Stephen Summerson Midland Railway Locomotives – Irwell Press
  - Vol. 4 – Johnson classes part 2 : the goods and later passenger tender engines, Deeley, Fowler and LTSR classes. ISBN 1-903266-55-6
