= Thornbury railway station =

Thornbury railway station may refer to:

- Thornbury (Gloucestershire) railway station in England
- Thornbury railway station, Melbourne in Australia
