= Iron Acton =

Village in South Gloucestershire, England

Coordinates: 51.549°N 2.463°W

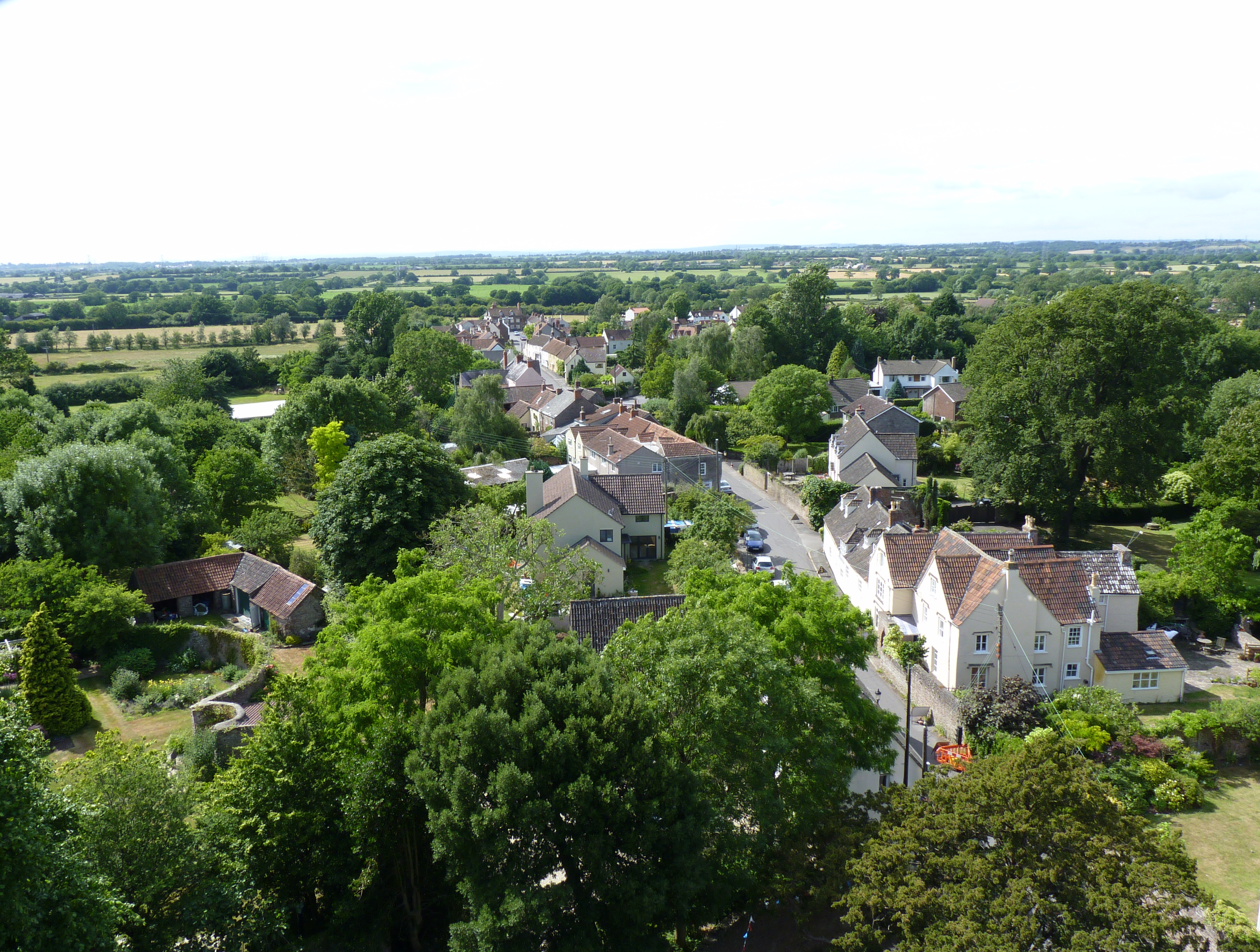
- Looking west down High Street from the tower of St. James the Less parish church

- Location within Gloucestershire
- Population: 1,346 (2011census)
- OS grid reference: ST680835
- Civil parish: Iron Acton
- Unitary authority: South Gloucestershire
- Ceremonial county: Gloucestershire
- Region: South West
- Country: England
- Sovereign state: United Kingdom
- Post town: Bristol
- Postcode district: BS37
- Dialling code: 01454
- Police: Avon and Somerset
- Fire: Avon
- Ambulance: South Western
- UK Parliament: Thornbury and Yate
- Website: IronActon.info

Iron Acton is a village, civil parish and former manor in South Gloucestershire, England. The village is about 2 miles (3 km) west of Yate and about 9 miles (14 km) northeast of the centre of Bristol. The B4058 road used to pass through the village but now by-passes it just to the north.

The "iron" part of the toponym originates from the iron that used to be mined near the village. "Acton" is derived from the Old English for "farm (or village) with oak trees". Still today there is an oak wood in the village beside the River Frome.

The civil parish also includes the smaller villages of Latteridge and Engine Common.

== Manor ==
The manor of Iron Acton was held by the de Acton family, which took its name from the manor, and which expired in the male line on the death of John IV de Acton in 1362. His heir to Iron Acton became the descendant of his aunt Matilda (or Maud) de Acton, wife of Nicholas Poyntz (d. 1311), feudal baron of Curry Mallet in Somerset. His descendants remained seated at Iron Acton for many generations and rose to prominence under the Tudor monarchs. Sir Nicholas Poyntz (1510–1556) was a prominent courtier during the latter part of the reign of King Henry VIII (1509–1547). His portrait drawing by Hans Holbein the Younger survives in the Royal Collection at Windsor Castle. He added the east wing to the moated manor house of Acton Court, which addition was lavishly decorated to impress King Henry VIII, who with his second wife, Anne Boleyn, visited the house in 1535 during a tour of the West Country. Sir Robert Poyntz (d. 1666), KB, MP for Gloucestershire and High Sheriff of Gloucestershire was the last in the male line of Poyntz of Iron Acton. He left no male progeny, only two daughters and co-heiresses, Grissel Poyntz and Margareta Poyntz.

== Acton Court ==
Acton Court on Latteridge Lane is the historic manor house of the manor of Iron Acton. It is a Tudor building, with later restorations. In the 16th century Nicholas Poyntz added the east wing to the existing moated house, which addition was lavishly decorated to impress King Henry VIII, who with his second wife, Anne Boleyn, visited the house in 1535 during a tour of the West Country.

Archive records describe the settlement as tenant for life by Sir Philip Parker Long (formerly Sir Philip Parker) of Erwarton, Suffolk (d.1741) surviving co-executor of the estate of Sir Walter Long of Whaddon 2nd Bart, and his wife Lady Martha, of property in the parish of Iron Acton, comprising principally the manor of Iron Acton with the manor house, grounds, rabbit warren and park of 153 acres.

== Historic estates ==
- Algars Court or Algars Manor, just south of the village, is also a Tudor house.

== Parish church ==
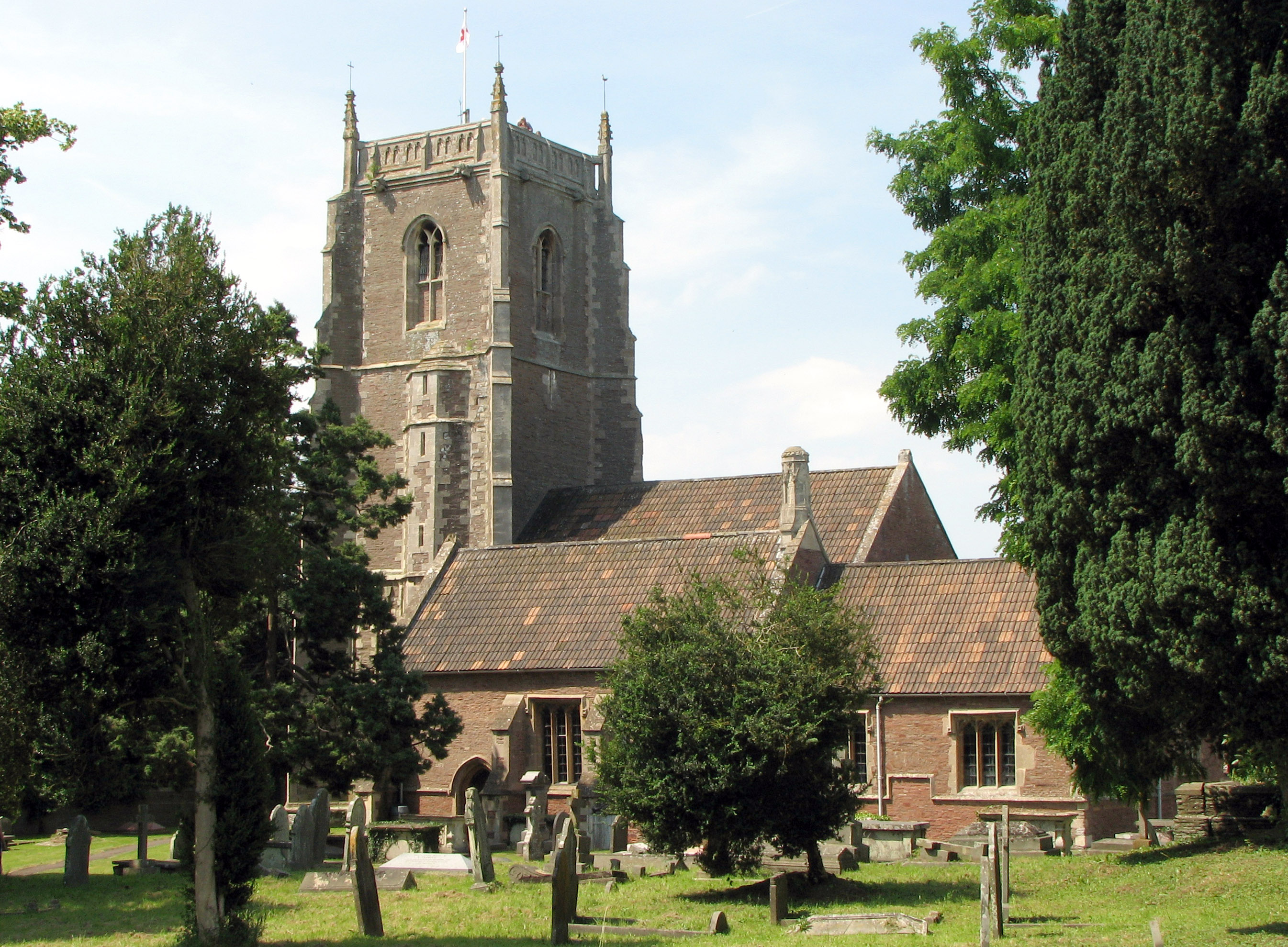
Parish church of St James the Less

19th-century engraving of Parish church of St James the Less. The preaching cross, of which then only the base survived, erected by Sir Robert Poyntz, is shown in the churchyard, centre.

The Church of England parish church of Saint James the Less is Perpendicular Gothic and includes a clerestory, south aisle and south chapel, two-storey north porch and three-stage bell-tower. The nave and south arcade are of three bays. The nave, chancel and south chapel all have wagon roofs and there is a fan vault under the tower.

The church was restored in 1878–79 under the direction of the Gothic Revival architect Sir T. G. Jackson. The high altar has a reredos designed by F. C. Eden and made in about 1930. Behind the altar of the south chapel is a screen also designed by Eden.

=== Poyntz Chapel ===
Arms of Poyntz: Quarterly 1st & 4th, barry of eight or and gules (Poyntz); 2nd & 3rd, quarterly per fess indented argent and azure (Acton). The escutcheon, suspended by the guige strap from an initial letter "T", is shown on a field of oak leaves, a reference to the etymology of the ancient settlement of Acton ("Oak-town").

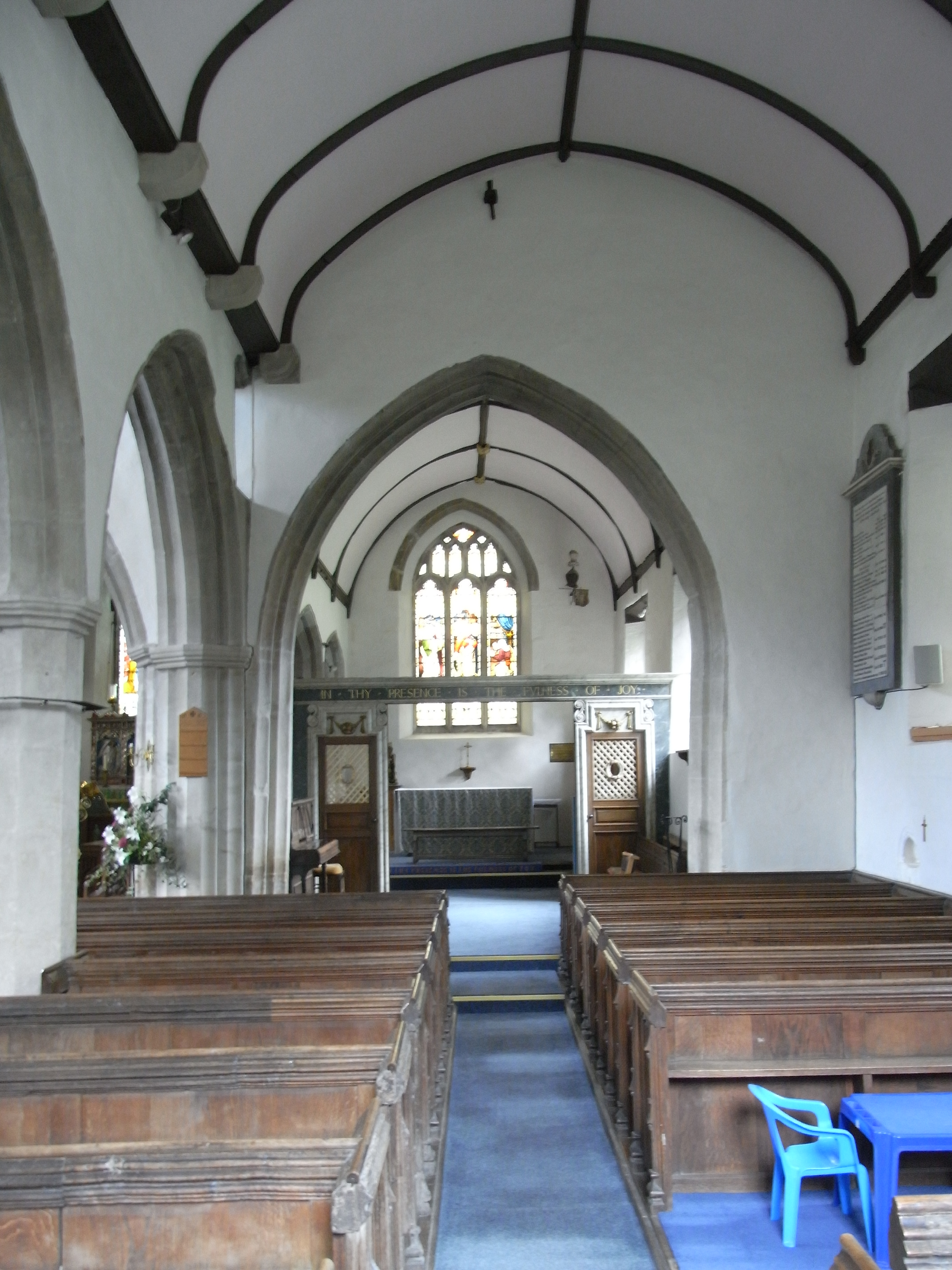
View eastwards along the south aisle towards the Poyntz Chapel. High on the east wall to the right of the window can be seen hanging the funeral helm with spur and piece of leather surcoat borne on the funeral bier of Sir John Poyntz (d. 1680).

The altar at the east end of the south aisle forms the focal point of the so-called Poyntz Chapel, which is not a separate chamber or structure. This is not to be confused with the Poyntz Chapel (formally termed "Chapel of Jesus") built by Sir Robert Poyntz (d. 1520) within The Gaunt's Chapel, Bristol.

Against the south wall is a 16th-century canopied tomb erected for a now unknown member of the Poyntz family. Of the three heraldic escutcheons comprised within the structure two are now blank and one bears the arms of the Acton family, from which the Poyntz's inherited the manor, A fess indented. No inscription survives. The tomb was covered with many layers of whitewash until this was removed in the 19th-century restoration.

Dividing the Poyntz Chapel from the chancel are a pair of stone effigies set on slabs at floor level. The figures show an armed knight of the 14th century beside a female figure, possibly his lady, but perhaps of a slightly later date. The knight is believed to represent Sir John Poyntz (d. 21 Sept 1376), son of Sir Nicholas Poyntz (d. 12 July 1311) feudal baron of Curry Mallet, Somerset, by Matilda Acton, his 2nd wife, daughter and eventual heiress of Sir John Acton (d. 1312) of Iron Acton. Buried beneath an incised slab set into the floor in the centre of the Poyntz Chapel is Robert Poyntz (1359–1439) between his two wives, 1st, Ann (family unknown), 2nd (marr. pre. 1389) Katherine FitzNichol, daughter of Sir Thomas FitzNichol of Hill, Gloucestershire, many times MP for Gloucestershire. Two other tombstones commemorate Florence Poyntz (d. 1598) and Hugh Poyntz (d. 1604), son of Sir Nicholas Poyntz (d. 1585/6) by Margaret Stanley, daughter of Edward Stanley, 3rd Earl of Derby.

== Transport ==
=== Rail ===
The Midland Railway opened its Thornbury Branch Line in 1872, including Iron Acton railway station to serve the village. The LMS closed the station in 1944 and it was demolished in the 1960s, but the line still carries one freight train per week between a stone quarry at Tytherington and the junction at Yate with the Birmingham and Gloucester line.

A freight-only branch serving an iron mine in Frampton Cotterell joined the branch line at the station. This was closed in 1872 but a truncated section of the line served as a coal depot until closure on 10 June 1963.

Iron Acton station had a single platform and a large wooden station building. The remains of the platform survive, as does a crossing-keeper's cottage to the south of the station site.

=== Bus ===
Buses through Iron Acton were severely cut back in 2022. As of October 2022, it was only served by a single bus per day in each direction on route 626.

== Amenities ==
Iron Acton hosts events throughout the year, including the annual May Day fair and horticultural show. Other events are organised by Acton Aid, a community organisation made up of men of the village who work together to benefit the parish of Iron Acton. Money is raised by holding social events such as the annual fireworks display and the Proms in the Meadows, and working with other parish organisations at the annual May Day fair. An example of such an event is the Victorian evening, during which local residents dressed up in Victorian era clothing for a fair on the street, which is accompanied by a brass band.

The village has its own football club, which played home games on the field behind the Rose and Crown public house on the High Street. The pub was closed and was turned into residential accommodation; Iron Acton F.C. now plays home games on Yate Common, Sunnyside Lane, Yate, 1.5 miles (2.4 km) away. There are two pubs in the village and there is no shop in the main part of the village, there is however a garage on the outskirts of the village that is open 24/7

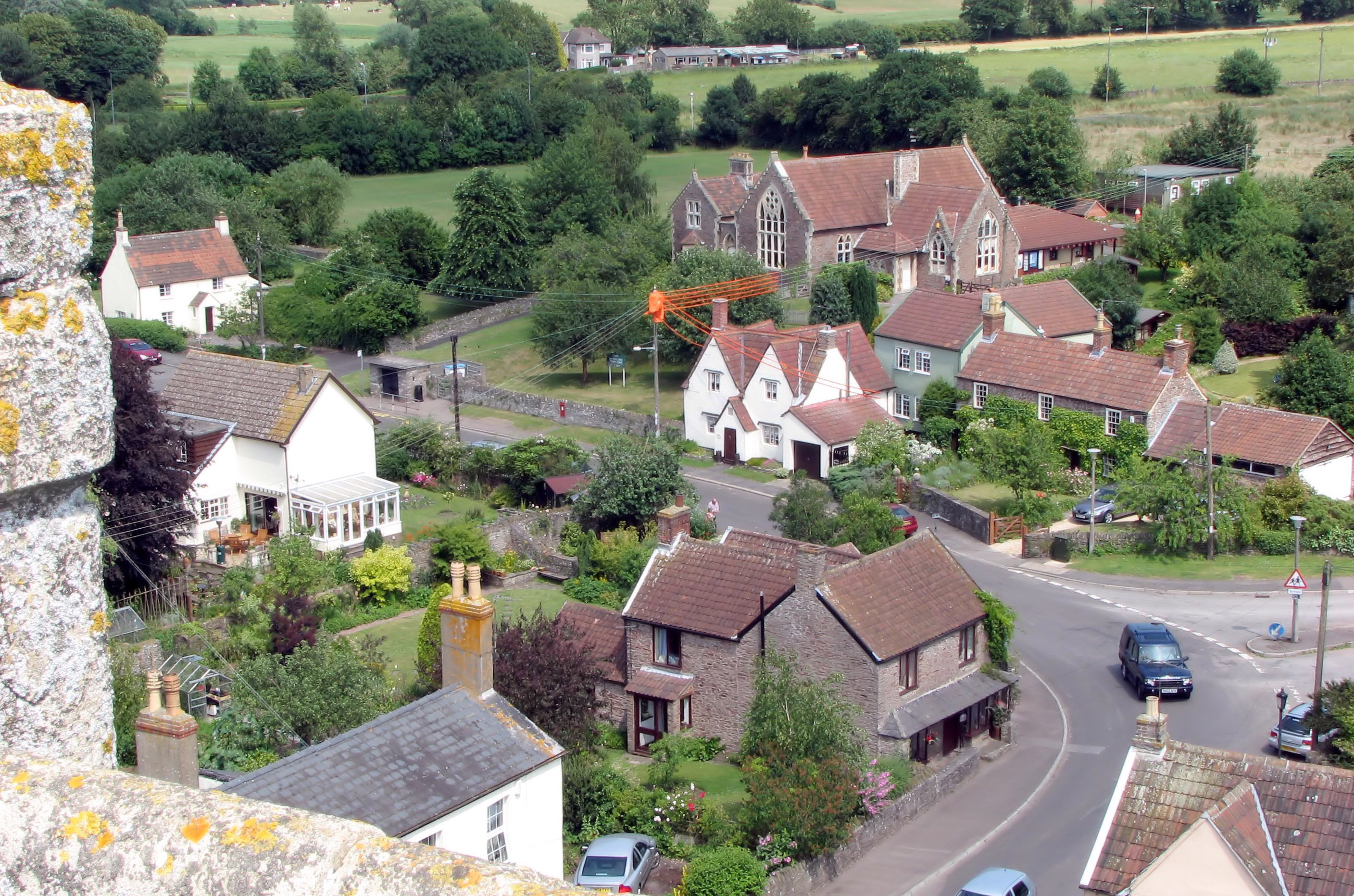
Iron Acton Primary School (above the orange wires), seen from the tower of the church

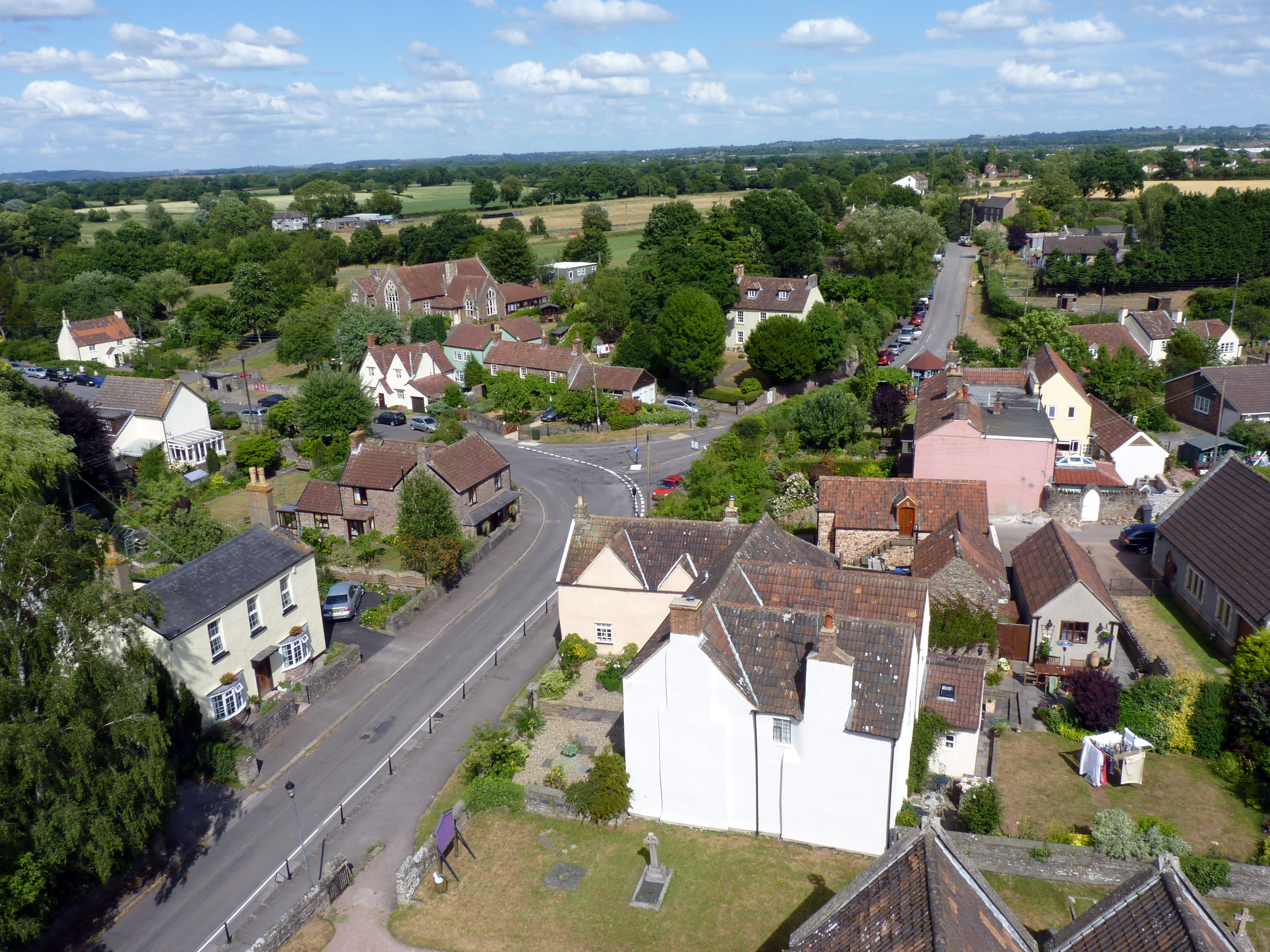
Looking east along the High Street, seen from tower of the church

== Bibliography ==
- Maclean, Sir John, Historical and Genealogical Memoir of the Family of Poyntz (Exeter, 1885)
- The Topographer, volume 5, issue 1 (March 1821), edited by Stebbing Shaw, Oxfordshire Visitation, pp. 45–8, pedigree and heraldry of Poyntz

== Sources ==
- Blair, Peter Hunter (1977) [1956]. An Introduction to Anglo-Saxon England (2nd ed.). Cambridge & London: Cambridge University Press. pp. 258–259. ISBN 0-521-29219-0.
- Verey, David (1970). Gloucestershire: The Vale and the Forest of Dean. The Buildings of England. Vol. 2. Harmondsworth: Penguin Books. pp. 276–278.
- Thompson, H.L., The Poyntz Family, Transactions of the Bristol and Gloucestershire Archaeological Society, 1879–80, Vol. 4, pp.73–85
