= Engine Common =

Village in Gloucestershire, England

Coordinates: 51°33′N 2°26′W

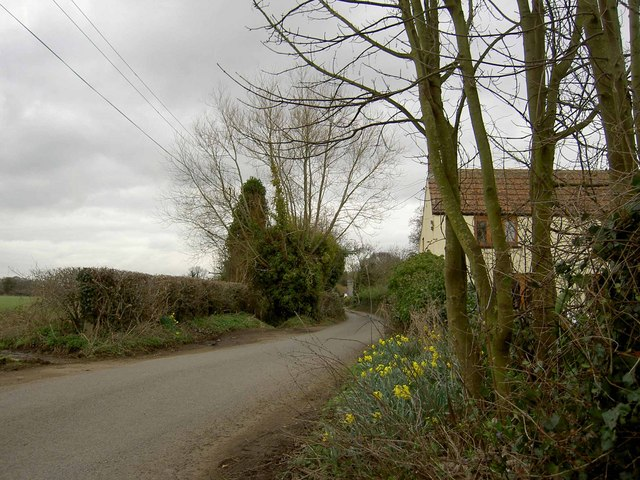
Dyers Lane, Engine Common

Engine Common is a village in the civil parish of Iron Acton in South Gloucestershire, England. It lies about 1 mile north west of Yate.
