= Charfield railway disaster =

1928 train crash in Charfield, England

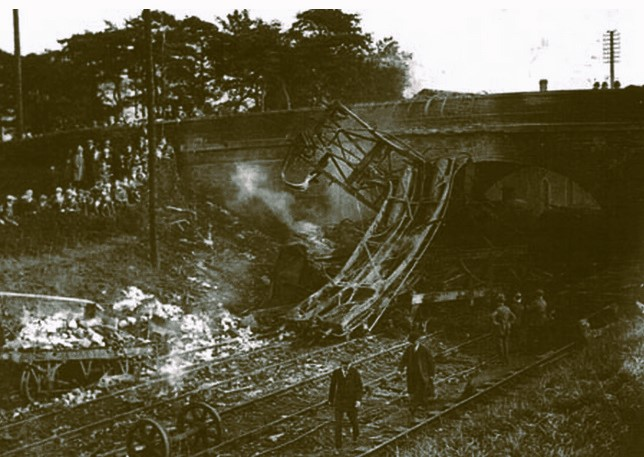
- The aftermath of the Charfield railway disaster

Details
- Date: October 13, 1928; 97 years ago 05:20
- Location: Charfield, Gloucestershire
- Coordinates: 51.6287°N 2.4005°W
- Country: England
- Line: Bristol and Gloucester Railway
- Incident type: Collision
- Cause: Driver error

Statistics
- Trains: 3
- Passengers: 60
- Deaths: 16
- Injured: 41

The Charfield railway disaster was a fatal train crash which occurred on 13 October 1928 in the village of Charfield in the English county of Gloucestershire. The London, Midland and Scottish Railway (LMS) Leeds to Bristol night mail train failed to stop at the signals protecting the down refuge siding at Charfield railway station. The weather was misty, but there was not a sufficiently thick fog for the signalman at Charfield to employ fog signalmen. A freight train was in the process of being shunted from the down main line to the siding, and another train of empty goods wagons was passing through the station from the Bristol (up) direction.

The mail train collided with the freight train and was derailed, coming into collision with the up train underneath the road bridge to the north of the station. Gas used to light the carriages ignited, and four carriages were burnt out. The driver and fireman of the mail train claimed that they had seen a clear distant signal on approach to the station, and therefore had assumed that the home signals protecting the station were also clear; however, testing of the signals after the accident confirmed that the distant had been correctly in the yellow "caution" position. The driver and fireman were charged with manslaughter, but were subsequently acquitted.

== Background ==
Early in the morning of 13 October, three down trains (the LMS parcels and goods trains and the GWR goods train) were expected to pass through Charfield.

The two goods trains were proceeding much slower than the parcels train. To prevent delays to the more important parcels train, signalmen H. Button of Charfield Box and R.H Smith of Berkeley Road Junction (the block post before Charfield) agreed to shunt the two goods trains clear. Button shunted the LMS Goods Train into a siding at Charfield whilst Smith shunted the GWR Goods Train into a siding at Berkeley Road Junction. The parcels train raced through the stations. After signalman F.W Booking of Wickwar (the signalbox after Charfield) signalled "out of section" to Button, he signalled for the LMS goods train to depart the sidings. However, the driver of this train chose to spend five minutes taking on water at Charfield, something he wasn't booked to do. Nor did he inform Button of this. As a result, the original plan for the GWR goods train had to be altered. The mail train meanwhile was fast approaching Charfield and with this in mind, Button was forced to shunt the GWR goods train into the sidings in Charfield once the LMS goods train had left.

== Trains involved ==
The 10:00 pm LMS down passenger and mail express from Leeds to Bristol consisted of Midland Railway Class 3 4-4-0 No. 714 steam locomotive hauling a 6-wheel tender, a 6-wheeled parcels van, a goods van, a composite passenger coach, two third-class coaches, another composite coach, a TPO sorting van, a TPO tender, a pair of TPO vans and a passenger brake van. Of these cars, the parcels van, front composite, both 3rd class Coaches and all four TPO vehicles' lighting was powered by flammable gases. In total, the train was carrying 23 gas canisters in these carriages. Only the front goods van had been constructed with electrical lighting, whilst the rear composite and brake van were built to use gas lighting, but had been converted. All eleven carriages were wooden and old at the time of the crash, with the newest coach being the goods van which was built in 1915; the oldest vehicles were the TPO vans which dated back to 1885.

All but the two front vans on the train had vacuum brakes which could be activated from the locomotive. The locomotive also carried a steam brake to brake itself and its tender. Both brakes were able to be activated from the footplate of the engine, and the vacuum brakes could be activated from the guard's van. In the locomotive was driver E.H Aldington and fireman F.C Want whilst in the brake van at the rear of the train was guard Miller. All three men knew each other well and were experienced. Aldington had worked on the railways since 1891, had been driving goods trains since 1916 and passenger trains since 1924. His last working day prior to the crash was 12 October, where he had driven the 1:45 am mail train from Birmingham to Bristol and then the 7:40 am Birmingham to Bristol mail train. Aldington had considerable experience running on this line, having been scheduled to work it every five days for eleven weeks. Fireman F.C Want had worked on the railways since 1917 with nine and three quarters of a year as a fireman and had known Aldington since December 1926. Unlike Aldington, Want was much less experienced on the route, having only handled it 30 times before. Guard Miller had worked on the railways since 1921.

The 9:15 pm Great Western Railway (GWR) down semi-fitted goods train from Oxley bound for Bristol. This train consisted of GWR 4300 Class 2-6-0 Locomotive No. 6381, a 6-wheeled tender, forty-nine loaded wagons and a brake van. The locomotive, tender and the front fifteen wagons had vacuum brakes to be operated from the engine, but the remaining 34 wagons were braked from the brake van. The crew aboard this train consisted of driver Gilbert and fireman H. Sutton in the engine and guard W. Fortune in the brake van.

The 4:45 am LMS up empty goods train from Westerleigh to Gloucester consisted of a 0-6-0 locomotive hauling its tender, forty-five empty wagons and a brake van. The crew aboard this train consisted of driver G. Honeyfield and fireman A. Clarke in the engine and guard Callaway.

Although not in the crash itself, two more trains were involved in the lead-up to the disaster, these being the 12:45 am down parcels train from Leicester to Bristol and the 10:35 pm down goods train from Washwood Heath to Bristol, both operated by the LMS.

== Crash ==
Approaching Charfield at high speed, Aldington told Want to look out for the down distant signal, even though Want wasn't as experienced on this line as he was, and the fog and lack of knowledge meant he was unsure as to the signal's location. However, 60 yards from the down distant, Want claimed to see the green signal and said to Aldington "He's got it off mate!" before shovelling in some more coal to the engine. As he returned the shovel to the tender, Aldington saw the GWR goods engine emerge from the fog. Realizing a collision was about to occur, he quickly applied the brakes before ducking down.

The mail train crashed into the GWR goods train, the engine of the LMS train clipping the edges of the two front-most goods vans of the GWR train before crashing into the tender, which at that point was slightly askew of the main line as it was being shunted clear. The LMS engine crashed into the right-hand side of the GWR tender and derailed to the right, ploughing into two empty wagons of the up LMS train before it overturned onto its right side against the up slope near the bridge. The GWR tender was flung onto its left side against the north side of the bridge, while the GWR engine became wedged against the abutment, causing the first six vehicles (the parcel van, the other van, the front composite, the two 3rd class carriages and the rear composite) to become wedged under the bridge.

Whilst the engine of the mail train was derailed and tossed clear, the tender was derailed but remained on the track. The sudden deceleration caused the two vans, the front composite coach and first 3rd class coach to violently telescope. The rear 3rd class coach hit the rear of the front coach, forcing the front of the carriage to become entangled with the coach ahead of it, causing both underframes to bend upwards until it came to rest leaning on the north side of the bridge. Part of the roof was torn off and thrown onto the bridge. The rear composite and the cars behind it came to an abrupt halt, but remained on the rails, each receiving varying amounts of damage.

The GWR goods train's first two wagons which were still being shunted clear when the LMS train hit received glancing blows whilst the tender of the train received the brunt of the impact. Both 6381's tender and engine were pinned against the wall by the mail train's carriages. The remaining forty-seven wagons mostly received either minor damage or were undamaged. Fortune's brake van was completely undamaged and the forty-seven wagons were able to be taken back.

The Westerleigh goods train was still passing under the bridge at the time of the collision. The engine and eight wagons were clear of the site when the collision occurred. The locomotive and front six wagons were undamaged, but the seventh and eighth were derailed, although they remained attached to the locomotive and upright, being dragged down the line until Honeyfield and Clarke realised what had occurred. The ninth wagon was derailed by the LMS mail locomotive, skidding into the down cutting by the bridge just ahead of the locomotive. The tenth wagon was hurled by the engine off the rails and collided with the down cutting of the bridge, coming to a halt close to the GWR engine. The eleventh wagon followed the tenth, clipping the mail train's tender which stopped it. The twelfth wagon came loose from the eleventh after colliding with it and being pushed so it was facing opposite to the rails. The thirteenth wagon was derailed and collided with the rear of the twelfth wagon. The fourteenth wagon had been pushed by the LMS mail locomotive's momentum off the Rails, facing parallel to the down line with minor damage. The fifteenth wagon had clipped the rear right-side of the fourteenth wagon and had derailed to the right of it. The sixteenth wagon was derailed at the front left side and the rear right side. The seventeenth wagon's coupling to the sixteenth broke in the collision and was slightly derailed. The eighteenth wagon had similarly been slightly derailed but was undamaged. The remaining 29 wagons and Callaway's van were undamaged and remained on the rails.

As Aldington had applied the brakes of the train and ducked, when the locomotive derailed he was mostly uninjured, although he was buried in coal for ten minutes before he was pulled clear of it. Want similarly was mostly uninjured although he too was buried in coal, but was able to climb out of it unlike Aldington. Even though his brake van was undamaged and remained on the rails, the sudden stop flung Miller from his chair, dislocating his shoulder.

Before Button ordered him to shunt clear, Gilbert saw the Charfield down distant turn to red after his engine passed by it. In the collision, Gilbert and Sutton were both thrown amongst the coals and were injured, Sutton receiving minor injuries whilst Gilbert was more seriously injured. In preparation for the shunting activity, Fortune had dismounted his van at Charfield Station and when the train began to shunt, he walked with the train along the platform before following it beside the tracks and was guiding Sutton and Gilbert (Sutton later claimed that he was unable to see anything outside the engine due to the thick fog) into the siding when the collision occurred. He was uninjured as he had been standing well behind the GWR locomotive.

Driver Honeyfield and Clarke of the Westerleigh goods train meanwhile had passed under the bridge at about 20 mph when he felt a tugging sensation on the train. Both men thought that it was nothing serious and continued before stopping the train at the up advance signal which was set to danger by Button after the collision. Looking back, they realized what had happened to his train. Guard Callaway of the Westerleigh goods train was slightly injured in the sudden stop of his train, but otherwise fine.

== Fire ==
In the aftermath of the collision, as in earlier railway crashes at Quintinshill, Hawes Junction and Thirsk, a fire broke out. It is believed that the gas cylinders of the first four cars were punctured and a cloud of gas quickly formed under the bridge and a fire broke out. Although many likely perished in the collision, it seems likely that the majority of the 14 passenger fatalities were due to the fire.

Seven of the 11 cars of the mail train (the two vans, the brake van, both composites and both 3rd class coaches) were completely destroyed by the fire. In a combination of the fire and the collision, the ninth to seventeenth wagons were completely destroyed. Two of the GWR goods train's wagons (the two the mail train clipped) were both completely destroyed.

== Victims ==
Intense fire made identification of the dead and even a complete body count difficult, but it is believed that 15 people died and a further 23 were injured. (The official report lists 16 deaths and 41 injuries). There is a memorial to remember those who lost their lives at St James Church in Charfield.

Archie Ayres was the local carpenter in 1928 and was regularly employed by the local undertakers, Goscombes, to make coffins. He made the coffins for the fifteen people killed in the train crash. According to his daughter, Mrs Smith (née Ayres) in 1999, he made thirteen coffins plus two small boxes. The latter contained the remains that could not be associated with particular individuals. According to L T C Rolt in Red for Danger, the crash blazed for twelve hours.

== Aftermath ==
Seconds after the collision, Button informed the company control office at Fishponds of the accident and requested ambulances, maintenance staff, cranes and other assistance to be sent from Bristol and Gloucester. Guard Callaway of the Westerleigh goods train meanwhile informed the Charfield stationmaster of the crash, the stationmaster arriving at 5:38 am, only eight minutes after Callaway had called him. Having established that Button had informed Booking and Smith of the obstruction, the stationmaster quickly informed the heads of LMS before making a human chain of rescuers to haul buckets of water to the fire whilst allowing people to take axes to cut their way into the wrecked train. The first doctors from Wotton-under-Edge arrived at 6:20 am whilst a special train carrying doctors arrived from Bristol at 7:17 am.

After extracting themselves from the coal, both Aldington and Want made their way to Button's signalbox and said "What is the meaning of this? Your distant was off!" but Button replied that such a thing was impossible. Button was correct, as he could not have 'pulled off' any down signal, and while the down distant showed clear via the repeater, this was found to be due to debris on the actuating cables and the weight of the debris was not enough to lower the blue lens (semaphore signals were lit with paraffin oil lamps at the time, which gave a distinctly yellowish flame - a blue lens covering the lamp would result in a green light being shown) to show the green light Want claimed to have seen.

When Want and Aldington were sent to trial for manslaughter, neither attempted to excuse themselves because of the poor weather or lack of fogmen, but rather put emphasis on the fact that the distant signal was at clear. Aldington said when the mail train was approaching Charfield, he was standing behind Want who was keeping his eyes out for signals which both saw as green. Because of this, Aldington assumed the station was clear of traffic and could proceed through to Wickwar. However, error by Button was ruled out in the investigation, since Button's signals would not be able to change the down distant due to the GWR Train occupying the section. The only possibilities were that Aldington and Want did not see the down distant, or that they saw the signal, which had been somehow set to green. The only way the latter could occur was if something heavy weighed down the cables, or if they had been sabotaged. However, no traces of either were found and the mystery remains to this day.

== Causes ==
The block telegraph instruments at Charfield had three different positions: train on line, line clear and line blocked. Not only was it in control of the station and sidings, the signal box was a block post for two sections: Berkeley Road to Charfield (up line) and Charfield to Wickwar (down line), and was in control of signals for the entrance to the station and the following block sections on each line. (This was standard block working – even though the box may control a section it controlled the signals for the entrance to next section along the line.) The down line signals protected trains in both the down line of the station and Charfield to Wickwar section of the down line which followed. It was on the down line that events would occur. The block instrument could not be set to 'line clear' until the train on the line had passed over a treadle at the next signal box and the signalman in the box had sent his consent by telegraph. The block instruments were interlocked with the signal levers so that unless the respective instrument stood at 'line clear', they could not be cleared to accept a train. This prevented any false signals being given by mistake.

When the GWR goods passed Button's 'clearing point' signal (the end of the section) at 5:13 am, it released the treadle and thus allowed the section from Berkeley road to Charfield to be cleared. He then shouted to Gilbert and Sutton of the goods train to shunt and 'pulled off' his shunting disc signal. At this time, nothing was out of the ordinary. It was less than an hour before dawn, and the railway tracks were shrouded with fog. Due to the fog, Button could not see his down distant signal or his down outer home signal (both were connected to electrical repeaters which showed the signal position via an instrument in his box), but he could see his 'fog object' and therefore saw no need to call out fogmen. The section from Berkeley Road to Charfield was clear, and therefore Button could accept the LMS night mail from Smith. He was perfectly justified in doing so, given that had a quarter of a mile clear between the clearing point signal and his outer home signal (the first "stop" signal controlled by Charfield box)- there was plenty of space for the mail to stop. The station, however, was occupied by the shunting goods train and therefore his signals stood at danger. He accepted the mail at 5:14 am.

The signals at Charfield should have been at danger, since the block system employed left no room for human error on the signalman's part. The outer home signal (which was at danger) at Charfield, was fitted with a track circuit. The GWR goods train was nearly clear of the line and the Westerleigh empty up goods train was approaching from Wickwar, when Button happened to notice the indicator for this track circuit. It changed to 'occupied', but then Button then saw to his alarm the indicator fly back to 'clear' again. This could mean only one thing: the mail had failed to stop at the signal. Having not heeded the distant signal which should have been at caution, Aldington and Want of the mail had assumed the line to be clear and had passed the home signal at around sixty miles an hour. To make matters worse Button had accepted the up goods train, which was approaching the road bridge. There was no error in Button's part in doing this, but it meant that the mail was running into a bottleneck – the track was in a cutting with a road bridge spanning both main lines, the sidings cutting off at the road bridge. Both main lines were blocked.

=== Prevention ===
The report on the accident by Colonel Pringle stated that the LMS conversion from gas to electric lighting was not going as fast as the Board of Trade (HMRI) had hoped, and had the rolling stock of the train been electrically lit, the effects of the collision would have been greatly mitigated. It also recommended the installation of the GWR invention of automatic train control, a system which worked by having an insulated steel bar laid centrally between the rails at all distant signals. When a train passed over it, the bar made contact with a spring-loaded shoe and so raised it. When the lever in the signal box was at 'clear', the bar was electrified and when a train passed over it a bell was sounded in the cab because the current passed through the shoe. However, when the lever was at 'caution', the shoe remained dead and when it was raised it broke an electrical circuit in the locomotive, sounding an alarm whistle in the cab and opening an air valve on the brake pipes, thus clearing the vacuum and applying the automatic vacuum brakes. This alone could have prevented the disaster.

It was undoubtedly clear that the disaster was caused due to Want and Aldington Overrunning the Signal but LMS management shared some responsibility for not quickening the pace of the conversion of lighting in trains (which the Ministry Of Transport had declared must occur after the train crash at Ais Gill in 1913 and that the driver of the LMS goods train from Washwood Heath also shared a minor role in the accident, as he had chosen to take water in Charfield after being shunted there to allow the parcels train through, without telling Button. Had he chosen to take water at the scheduled point, then the GWR goods train would not have been delayed and been forced to shunt again for the mail train at Charfield.
