= Charfield railway station =

Former railway station in England

Charfield
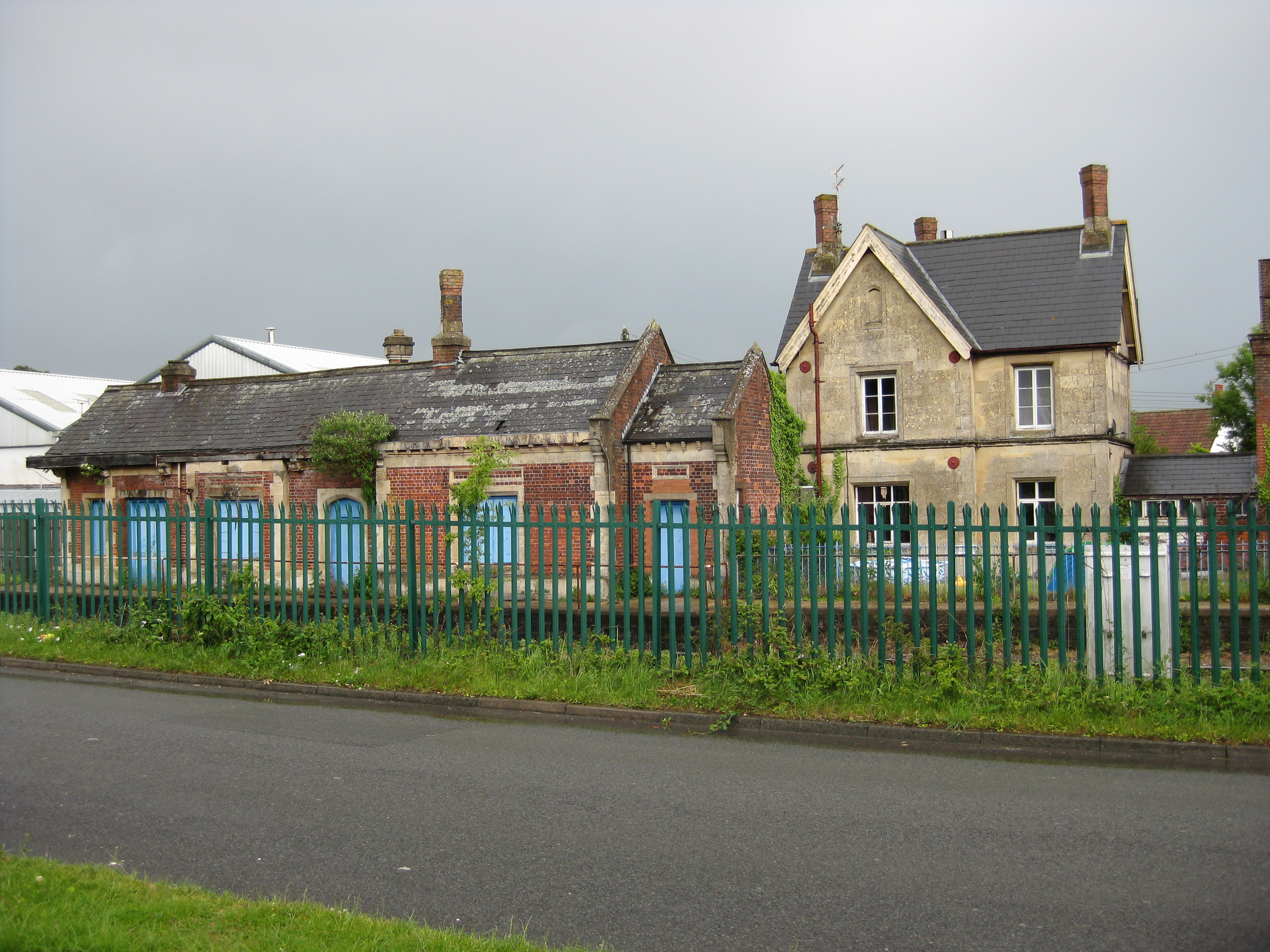

General information
- Location: Charfield, South Gloucestershire; England
- Coordinates: 51.628051°N 2.399764°W
- Grid reference: ST723922
- Platforms: 2

Other information
- Status: Disused
- Station code: CFI

History
- Original company: Bristol and Gloucester Railway
- Pre-grouping: Midland Railway

Key dates
- 8 July 1844: Opened
- 4 January 1965: Station closed to passengers
- 6 September 1965: Station closed to goods
- 2027: Planned reopening

Listed Building – Grade II
- Official name: FORMER BOOKING HALL AND WAITING ROOM AT CHARFIELD STATION, STATION ROAD
- Designated: 5 June 1984
- Reference no.: 1114969

Listed Building – Grade II
- Official name: FORMER STATIONMASTER'S HOUSE AT CHARFIELD STATION, STATION ROAD
- Designated: 5 June 1984
- Reference no.: 1321194
Location

Charfield railway station served the village of Charfield in South Gloucestershire, England. The station was on the Bristol and Gloucester Railway, originally a broad gauge line overseen by Isambard Kingdom Brunel, but later taken over by the Midland Railway and converted to standard gauge.

== History ==
Charfield station opened with the Bristol and Gloucester line on 8 July 1844 and had substantial Brunel-designed buildings on both platforms. There were sidings to the north and south, and those to the north were converted to loops to allow slow trains to be overtaken by faster trains.

In 1928, the Charfield railway disaster occurred when a southbound night-time mail train overran signals into a goods train manoeuvring into these sidings, and in the collision the mail train was diverted into the path of a northbound freight train. Gas from the mail train ignited and 15 people died in the blaze. According to some accounts, among them were two children whose identity was never established.

Passenger services were withdrawn from Charfield on 4 January 1965 with the removal of stopping services on the Bristol to Gloucester line. Goods services were withdrawn on 6 September of the same year. The main station building and the station master's house remain, in residential use.

== Reopening ==
Services between Bristol and Birmingham pass through Charfield. There have been discussions about the viability of reopening the station. The costs would be shared between Gloucestershire and South Gloucestershire councils since, although the station would be in South Gloucestershire, the nearby town of Wotton-under-Edge would be a principal beneficiary.

In February 2019, the West of England Combined Authority announced a £500,000 feasibility study into plans for two new bypasses and work to see whether Charfield is viable for reopening to passengers. In June 2019, a further £900,000 was allocated for the production of a full business case for the reopening of the station.

The January 2020 version of the Joint Local Transport Plan 4 (JLTP4, led by the West of England Combined Authority) proposed to deliver by 2023–2024 a "New station at Charfield funded through the WECA Investment Fund, to support housing growth".

In June 2020, Councillor Toby Savage, leader of South Gloucestershire Council, mentioned the possibility of re-opening Charfield station during an announcement of plans for enhanced services between Bristol and Gloucester.

A plan agreed by the West of England Combined Authority on 8 December 2020 set out projects that could potentially be delivered between 2020 and 2030, including the reopening of Charfield station.

A 12-week public consultation on the re-opening proposals was held between 19 October 2021 and 10 January 2022, with the new station proposed to open during Spring 2027.

Planning permission for the new station (South Gloucestershire Council, ref P22/05778/R3F) was granted in March 2023. Preparation work for construction started in May 2025 and expected to be finished in early 2027.

The business case contains journey estimates of 86,673 in 2027, of which 76,588 will be new to rail.

These journey numbers are forecast to grow to 128,387 by 2030 (with 113,485 new to rail journeys) and 154,010 by 2042 (with 136,305 of those being new to rail).

Construction of the new railway station started in August 2025 and is expected to take two years, with expected completion in Spring 2027

== Services ==
Preceding station	Historical railways	Following station
Wickwar; Line open, station closed	Bristol and Gloucester Railway; Midland Railway	Berkeley Road; Line open, station closed
	Disused railways	
Terminus	Sharpness Branch Line; Midland Railway	Berkeley; Line and station closed
	Proposed services	
Yate	Great Western Railway; MetroWest	Cam and Dursley
