= St James' Church, Charfield =

Coordinates: 51.6180°N 2.4073°W

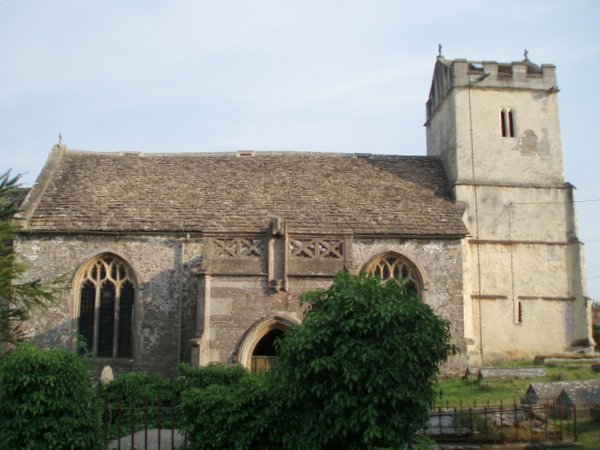
- St James' Church, Charfield, from the north

- Location in Gloucestershire
- OS grid reference: ST 718 911
- Location: Charfield, Gloucestershire
- Country: England
- Denomination: Anglican

Architecture
- Functional status: Redundant
- Heritage designation: Grade I
- Designated: 30 March 1960
- Architectural type: Church
- Style: Gothic
- Groundbreaking: 13th century
- Completed: 15th century

Specifications
- Materials: Stone with Cotswold stone slate roofs

St James' Church is a historic Anglican church at Churchend in the village of Charfield, Gloucestershire, England and is under the care of The Churches Conservation Trust. It is recorded in the National Heritage List for England as a designated Grade I listed building. It stands on a steep hillside overlooking a valley.

== History ==
The church originates from the 13th century. It was largely rebuilt in the 15th century, using money from the local wool trade. During the 18th century the industry moved into the valley, isolating the church. It was repaired during the 1970s.

== Architecture ==
St James' is constructed in stone rubble, with Cotswold stone slate roofs. Its plan consists of a nave with a south aisle and a north porch, a chancel, and a west tower. The tower is in four stages with diagonal buttresses. In the top stage are two-light bell openings, and the parapet is battlemented. On top of the tower is a saddleback roof. In the north wall of the nave are two three-light windows, between which is a porch with a pierced parapet and a niche for a statue. The chancel contains two three-light windows in the north wall, a three-light east window, and a blocked priest's door. Along the wall of the south aisle are three three-light windows.

Internally, between the nave and the south aisle is a three-bay arcade with octagonal piers. In the nave is a squint. The chancel contains a trefoil-headed piscina and the remains of heads to image niches. There are memorials dated 1717 and 1756.

== External features ==
The churchyard contains five separate chest tombs, and a group of four chest tombs, all of which are designated as Grade II listed buildings. They all date from the 18th century and are in limestone ashlar. The group of four tombs date from the same period and are surrounded by cast iron railings. Also in the churchyard is a memorial to the 15 people who were killed in the Charfield railway disaster in 1928, and the war grave of a World War II airman.

== See also ==
- List of churches preserved by the Churches Conservation Trust in the English Midlands
