= Wickwar railway station =

Former railway station in England

Coordinates: 51.6013°N 2.3968°W

Wickwar railway station served the village of Wickwar in South Gloucestershire, England. The station was on the Bristol and Gloucester Railway, originally a broad gauge line overseen by Isambard Kingdom Brunel, but later taken over by the Midland Railway and converted to standard gauge.

Wickwar station opened with the Bristol and Gloucester line in 1844 and had Brunel designed buildings on the down platform towards Bristol, but only a small hut on the up platform. The platforms were narrow and the station was situated high on an embankment just north of the tunnel that ran beneath the village itself. There were sidings and a goods yard to the south, between the station and the tunnel.

Passenger services were withdrawn from Wickwar in January 1965 with the removal of stopping services on the Bristol to Gloucester line. Goods services had been withdrawn in June 1963. The main station buildings were demolished, though the station master's house remains.

== Services ==
Preceding station	Disused railways	Following station
Yate; Line and station open	Bristol and Gloucester Railway; Midland Railway	Charfield; Line open, station closed<
