= Amalgamated Roadstone Corporation =

- Company type: Public
- Industry: Quarrying
- Founded: 1935
- Defunct: 1989
- Fate: Acquired
- Successor: Hanson plc
- Headquarters: London, UK

Amalgamated Roadstone Corporation (ARC) was a British stone quarrying company.

== History ==
Amalgamated Roadstone Corporation Ltd. was formed on 23 April 1935 to acquire six quarry companies in Britain. These were Betty and Tom Ltd, Carreg-y-Liam Quarries Ltd, National Road Materials Ltd, National Roadstone Ltd, Port Nant Quarries Ltd, and Roads Reconstruction (1934) Ltd.

In 1947 ARC acquired the majority of the shares of the British Quarrying Co Ltd (BQC) and its associated quarries. By 1958 the company owned 58 quarries.

The company was acquired by Hanson plc as part of its acquisition of Consolidated Gold Fields in 1989.

== Locations ==
Locations of Quarries include:

=== Avon ===
- Conygar Quarry, Clevedon (formally Roads Reconstruction (1934) Ltd.) - closed 1935
- Grovesend Quarries, Tytherington (formally Roads Reconstruction (1934) Ltd.)
- Sandford Quarry, Banwell (formally Roads Reconstruction (1934) Ltd.)
- Winford Quarry, Bristol (part of St. Kevern & Associated Quarried Ltd. subsidiary) - closed 1954

=== Cornwall ===
- Penlee Quarries (formally Penlee Quarries Ltd.) - closed 1972
- Rosenython Quarry, St. Keverne (formally West of England Road-Metal Co. Ltd.)
- Stepper Point Quarry, Padstow (part of Cornish Road-Metal Ltd. subsidiary) - closed 1948
- Porthallow & Porthoustock Quarries, St. Keverne (part of St. Kevern & Associated Quarried Ltd. subsidiary) - closed 1958

=== East Lothian ===
- East Saltoun Quarry, Pencaitland (part of Amalgamated Lime Co. Ltd.)

=== Kent ===
- Borough Green Works, Borough Green (formally British Quarring Co. Ltd.)

=== Somerset ===
- Cranmore Depot (formally Roads Reconstruction (1934) Ltd.)
- Emborough Quarry (formally Roads Reconstruction (1934) Ltd.) - closed 1965
- New Frome Quarry (formally Roads Reconstruction (1934) Ltd.)
- Vobster Quarry, Mells Road (formally Roads Reconstruction (1934) Ltd.) - closed 1966
- Windsor Hill Quarry, Shepton Mallet (formally Roads Reconstruction (1934) Ltd.) - closed 1942

=== Worcestershire ===
- Malvern Central Plant Workshops
