= Tytherington, Cheshire =

Area of Macclesfield, Cheshire, England

Coordinates: 53.2746°N 2.1277°W

Tytherington
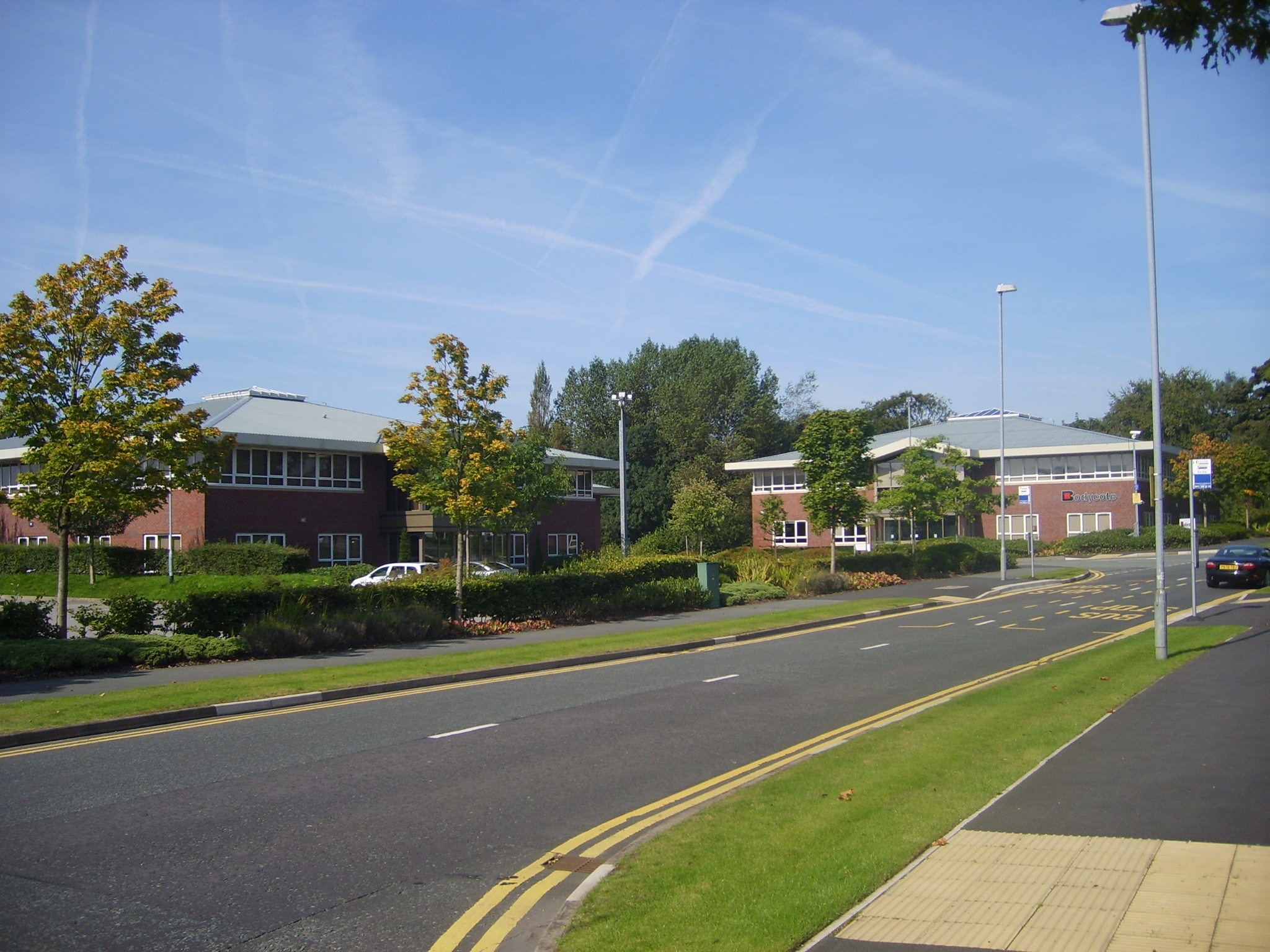
- Office buildings at Tytherington Business Park (2009)

- Location within Cheshire
- Civil parish: Macclesfield
- Unitary authority: Cheshire East
- Ceremonial county: Cheshire
- Region: North West
- Country: England
- Sovereign state: United Kingdom
- Post town: MACCLESFIELD
- Postcode district: SK10
- Dialling code: 01625
- Police: Cheshire
- Fire: Cheshire
- Ambulance: North West
- UK Parliament: Macclesfield

Tytherington is an area in the north of Macclesfield, Cheshire, England. Tytherington Wood forms part of Macclesfield Riverside Park. Tytherington Business Park lies to the north-east.

Manchester Road divides the housing estate, the "Dorchester Way area" being to the west and "Rugby Drive area" to the east. Rugby Drive derives its name from Macclesfield Rugby Club, since relocated to Prestbury. The rugby pitch remains but is used predominantly for football.

Tytherington has become a relatively affluent residential area, the average house price being around £320,000.

== Tytherington Hall ==
Tytherington Hall (or Tytherington House) was a stone mansion built by the wife of William Brocklehurst in the 19th century as a surprise for her husband. Brocklehurst's wife led him to the gates to the driveway from where Brocklehurst "refused to go any further". The building later became the residence of Mr Henry Charlton, a philanthropic cotton merchant from Manchester. Miss Salt from Buxton bought the house in the early 20th century and named it 'Marlborough College for Girls'.

During World War II, American soldiers were billeted in the Hall and in Nissen huts dotted around the grounds. In the times of the occupation by the Americans and other troops the Hall fell into disrepair and was demolished in the 1960s to make way for Marlborough Primary School and the Tytherington housing estate.

== History ==
Tytherington was formerly a township in the parish of Prestbury, in 1866 Tytherington became a separate civil parish, on 1 April 1936 the parish was abolished and merged with Macclesfield and Bollington. In 1931 the parish had a population of 318.

Tytherington was in Macclesfield Rural District until 1936 when it became part of the Municipal Borough of Macclesfield, from 1974 to 2009 it was in Macclesfield non-metropolitan district.

== See also ==
- Tytherington Old Hall
