= Charfield =

Village in South Gloucestershire, England

Coordinates: 51.62611°N 2.4058°W

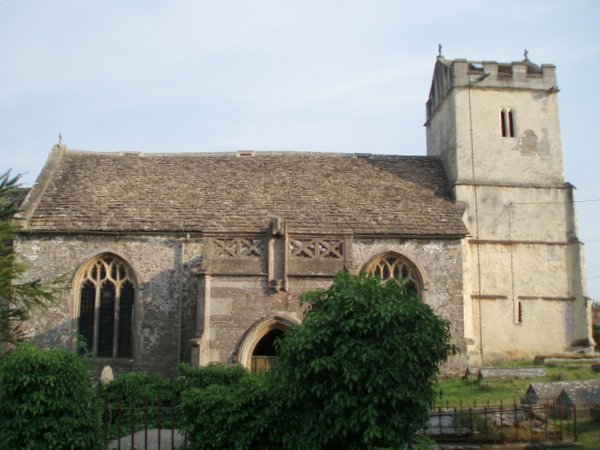
- St. James church, Churchend

- Location within Gloucestershire
- Population: 2,538 (2011)
- OS grid reference: ST7292
- Civil parish: Charfield
- Unitary authority: South Gloucestershire
- Ceremonial county: Gloucestershire
- Region: South West
- Country: England
- Sovereign state: United Kingdom
- Post town: WOTTON-UNDER-EDGE
- Postcode district: GL12
- Police: Avon and Somerset
- Fire: Avon
- Ambulance: South Western
- UK Parliament: Thornbury and Yate

Charfield is a village and civil parish in South Gloucestershire, England, south-west of Wotton-under-Edge near the Little Avon River and the villages of Falfield and Cromhall. The parish includes the hamlet of Churchend.

== Village ==
Charfield is a medium-sized village of about 2,500 residents with two pubs, The Railway Tavern and The Plough Inn, a convenience store with Post Office, a cafe, a petrol station with a small shop, a Co-op (opened December 2023) as well as two churches. There are seven main housing areas. Farm Lees, Longs View, Manor Lane and Woodlands have existed for some time. Two new housing developments were built in 2018-2019: St James Mews, opposite St John's Church, and Charfield Village, at the eastern end of the village near the Renishaw PLC site, as well as the Posket Way development, which includes the Bridge Cafe. The primary school has around 250 students.

The Church of St James, in Churchend, dates from the 13th century and is a grade I listed building.

== Governance ==
An electoral ward with the same name exists. This ward starts in the east in Charfield and then stretches west to Falfield. The ward's population at the 2011 census was 4,678.

The parish council has responsibility for local issues, including setting an annual precept (local rate) to cover the council's operating costs and producing annual accounts for public scrutiny. The parish council evaluates local planning applications and works with the local police, district council officers, and neighbourhood watch groups on matters of crime, security, and traffic. The parish council's role also includes initiating projects for the maintenance and repair of parish facilities, such as the Memorial Hall and playing field and playground, as well as consulting with the district council on the maintenance, repair, and improvement of highways, drainage, footpaths, public transport, and street cleaning. Conservation matters (including trees and listed buildings) and environmental issues are also of interest to the council.

The parish council is also a burial authority, and has its own burial ground in nearby Churchend.

== Railway ==
The Bristol-Birmingham main railway line runs through the village. Charfield railway station closed in January 1965 but still stands, and discussions continue about the viability of re-opening it. The costs of re-opening would be shared between Gloucestershire and South Gloucestershire Councils since, although the station would be in South Gloucestershire, the nearby Gloucestershire town of Wotton-under-Edge would be a principal beneficiary.

The railway line marks the division of the village between two different telephone areas (01453-54x based on Wotton-under-Edge, and 01454-26x based on Falfield). The village is on the outer limits of both areas. The village has now been fibre-enabled, allowing FTTC connections.

On 11 October 2022 it was announced that South Gloucestershire Council and Network Rail have submitted a planning application for a new train station in Charfield. The proposed station, to be built on land off Station Road in the centre of the village, will include two platforms serving north and southbound journeys, a pedestrian footbridge, a bus stop, covered cycle parking, and car parking.

== Railway history ==
The Charfield railway disaster was a fatal train crash which occurred on 13 October 1928. The Leeds to Bristol LMS night mail train crashed under a road bridge near Charfield railway station, killing 15 and injuring 23. Amongst the dead were two children whose remains remain unidentified.

== Charfield Memorial Hall and Playing Field ==
Charfield Memorial Hall and Playing Field is in the centre of Charfield. The Hall has recently been refurbished and the play area upgraded with new equipment.

== See also ==
- St James' Church, Charfield
