= Tytherington Old Hall =

Coordinates: 53.28092°N 2.13247°W

Tytherington Old Hall is a former country house in the Tytherington area of Macclesfield, Cheshire, England. It was built in the late 16th century for the Worth family. The building was much altered during the 20th century, and as of 2010 was in use as an office. Since 2006, it has been renovated and converted to a family home. The house is constructed in timber framing on a stone plinth with stone-flagged roofs. The timber-framing includes close studding and herringbone decoration. It is recorded in the National Heritage List for England as a designated Grade II listed building.

== See also ==
- Listed buildings in Macclesfield
