= Yate railway station =

Railway station near Bristol, England

Yate
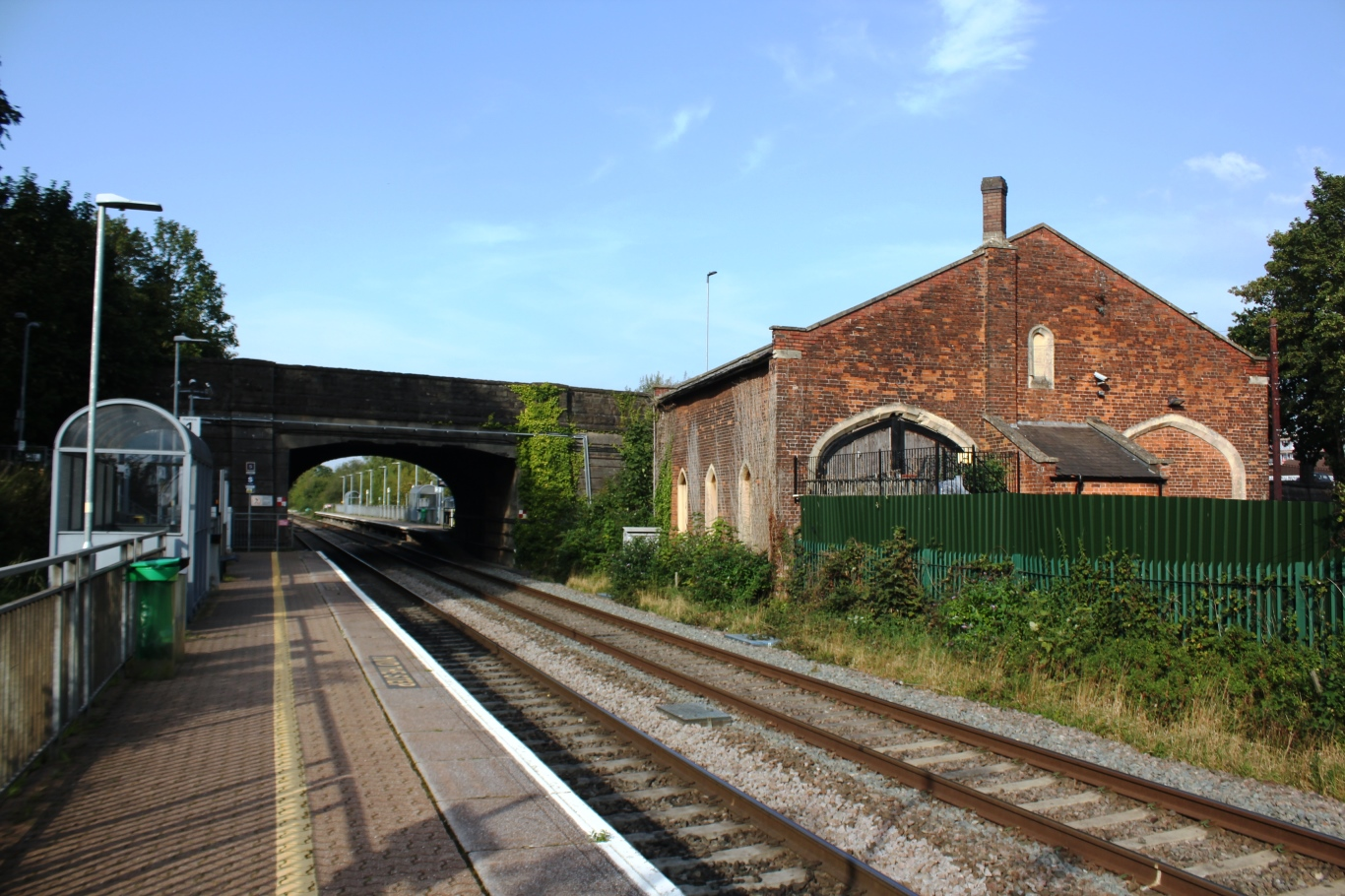
- The northbound platform with the former goods shed on the right

General information
- Location: Yate, South Gloucestershire Gloucestershire; England
- Coordinates: 51.5411°N 2.4319°W
- Grid reference: ST701826
- Managed by: Great Western Railway
- Platforms: 2

Other information
- Station code: YAE
- Classification: DfT category F1

History
- Original company: Bristol and Gloucester Railway
- Pre-grouping: Midland Railway
- Post-grouping: LMS

Key dates
- 8 July 1844: Opened
- 4 January 1965: Closed
- 11 May 1989: Reopened

Passengers
- 2020/21: ▼68,562
- 2021/22: ▲0.177 million
- 2022/23: ▲0.238 million
- 2023/24: ▲0.294 million
- 2024/25: ▲0.360 million
Location
Notes
- Passenger statistics from the Office of Rail and Road

Yate railway station serves the town of Yate in Gloucestershire, in south west England. The station is located on the main Bristol to Birmingham line between Bristol Parkway and Cam & Dursley, and is operated by Great Western Railway.

== History ==
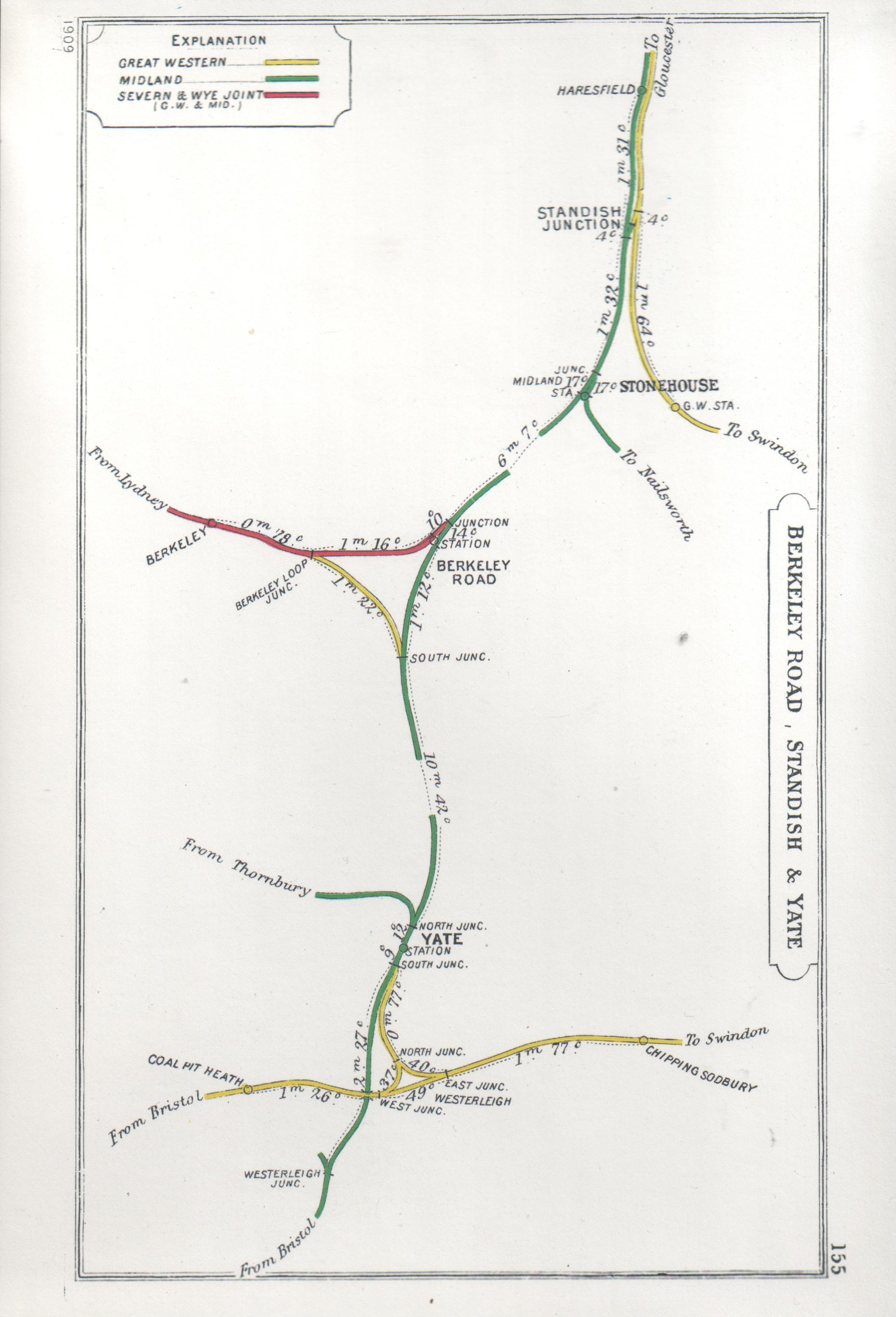
A 1909 Railway Clearing House map of railways in the vicinity of Yate

The Yate station first opened on 8 July 1844 and closed on 4 January 1965, along with other wayside stations on the former Bristol and Gloucester Railway; the local stopping service on the route having been withdrawn as a result of the Beeching Axe. This had both its platforms on the southern side of the road bridge mentioned above - the original 1844 goods shed still stands (now in commercial use) next to the old southbound platform site. The station was reopened by British Rail on 11 May 1989 with the backing of Avon County Council.

When first open, trains headed south along the original B&GR/Midland route via Fishponds to reach Bristol, although a connection was subsequently laid in to link this route with the rival Great Western Railway's 1903 "Badminton Line" from Wootton Bassett to Patchway (the current South Wales Main Line) in 1908. The new connection left the older line by means a flying junction at Yate South before heading southwest to join the SWML at the triangular Westerleigh Junction. Though jointly built by the two companies for the purpose of giving the GWR access to the Severn Rail Bridge and Severn and Wye Railway, it also provided an alternative route to Bristol Temple Meads via Filton and the Great Western soon made use of it to compete with the Midland for Bristol to Birmingham traffic, much to the dismay of the latter company. All services now use this newer line to get to Bristol, as the original 1844 route through Mangotsfield was abandoned in January 1970 following the completion of the Bristol area resignalling scheme. A short section of the old route was retained from Yate South Junction after the rest closed, to serve a domestic waste transfer depot and fuel oil distribution terminal at Westerleigh sidings. This line is still in use today.

It is the junction station for the Thornbury Branchline, however the passenger stations on this branch have long since closed (trains ceased in 1944) and the line remained open to serve Tytherington Quarry until September 2013, when it was placed 'Out of Use' by Network Rail following the mothballing of the quarry at the beginning of the year. The line has now (summer 2017) returned to use following the reopening of the quarry, with Mendip Rail running periodic stone trains.

In the Strategic Rail Authority’s 2007/08 financial year, Yate was ranked as the 1,104th most-used station in the UK. In the Office of Rail and Road's 2019/20 estimations, Yate ranked 1,114th most used station.

=== Facilities ===
The station is staffed on weekday mornings. It has two staggered platforms, separated by the A432 road bridge. An automated ticket machine was installed in mid-2007, but stopped functioning due to vandalism and is reported to be "unlikely to be replaced in the foreseeable future". A new ticket machine was installed in 2013 on platform 1, whilst the portakabin ticket office is on the opposite platform. Digital information screens, customer help points and timetable posters provide train running information, whilst CCTV was installed here in 2011. Step-free access to both platforms is available (via ramps from the road bridge to platform 1).

== Services ==
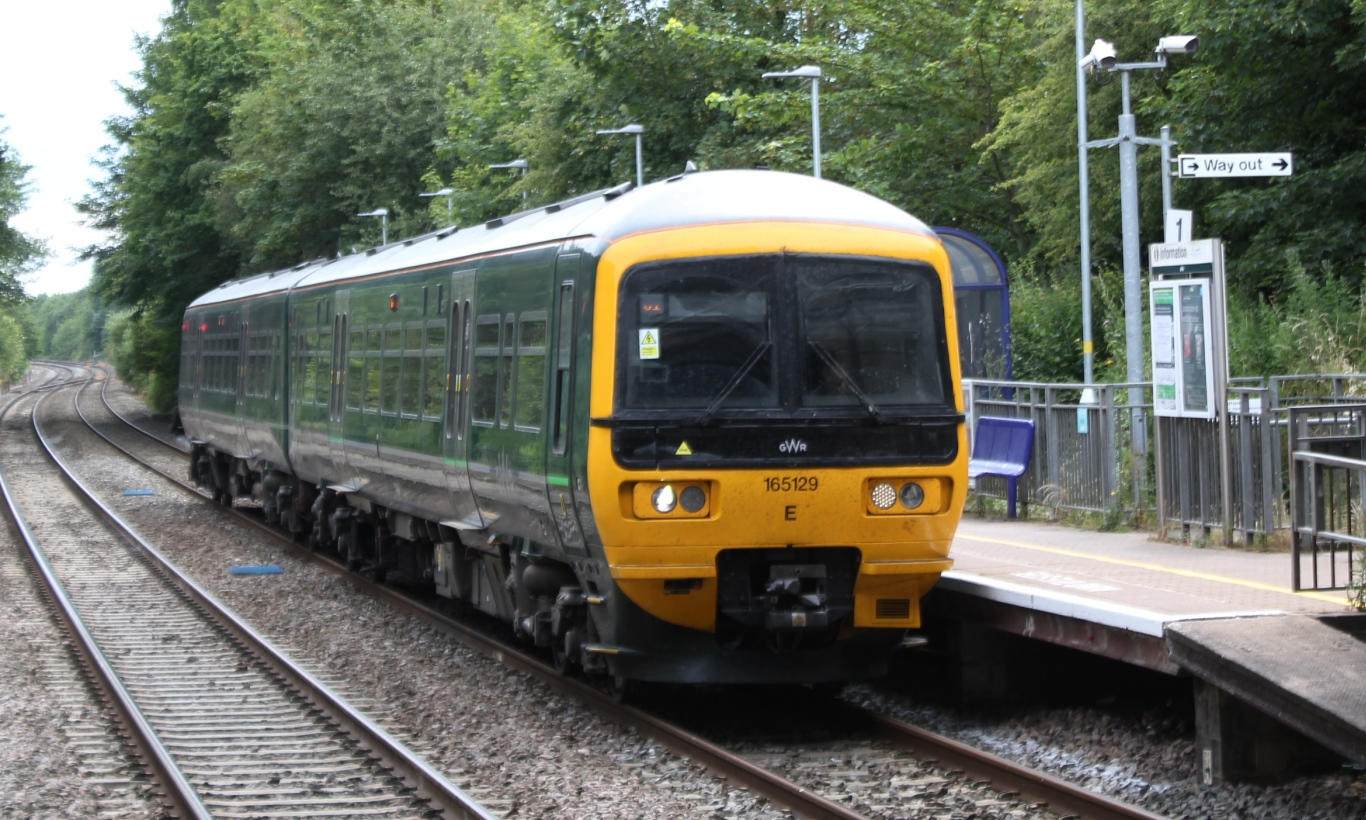
A GWR Class 165 at the northbound platform

The station is served Monday to Saturday by two trains every hour in both directions between Gloucester and Westbury via Bristol Temple Meads (with hourly extensions to/from Worcester northbound and to/from Weymouth southbound, plus a single service to/from Portsmouth Harbour). In May 2023, additional trains to/from Bristol were introduced as part of Phase 2 of the MetroWest scheme. Yate station is also served by an hourly Sunday service. A normal service operates on most bank holidays.

Preceding station	National Rail	Following station
Bristol Parkway	Great Western Railway; Gloucester - Westbury	Cam and Dursley
	Disused railways	
Mangotsfield; Line and station closed	Bristol and Gloucester Railway; Midland Railway	Wickwar; Line open, station closed
Terminus	Thornbury Branch Line; Midland Railway	Iron Acton; Line open, station closed
