= Thornbury branch line =

Railway line in the West of England

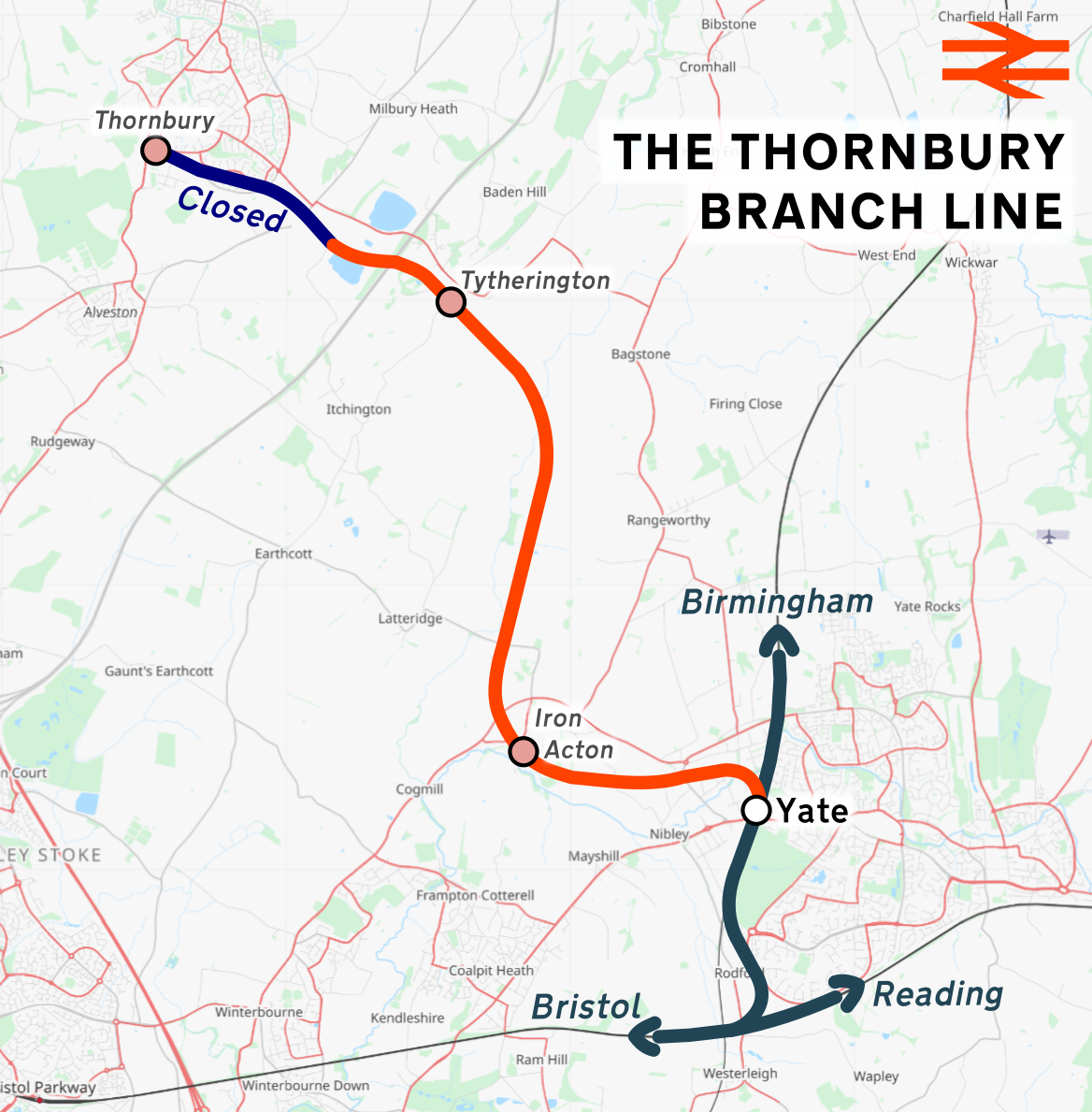
Route map (Click to expand)

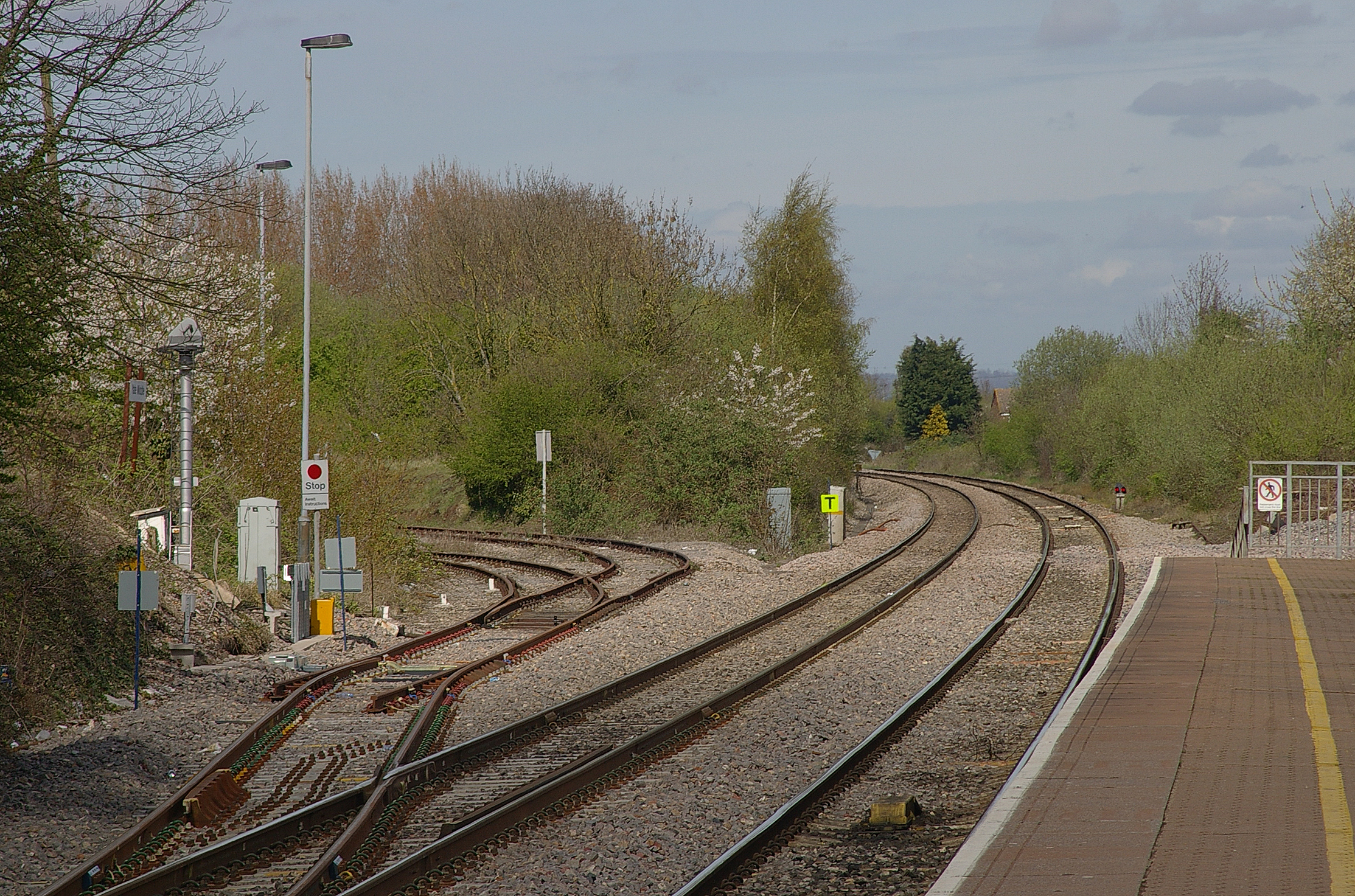
The branch departs from the main line at Yate.

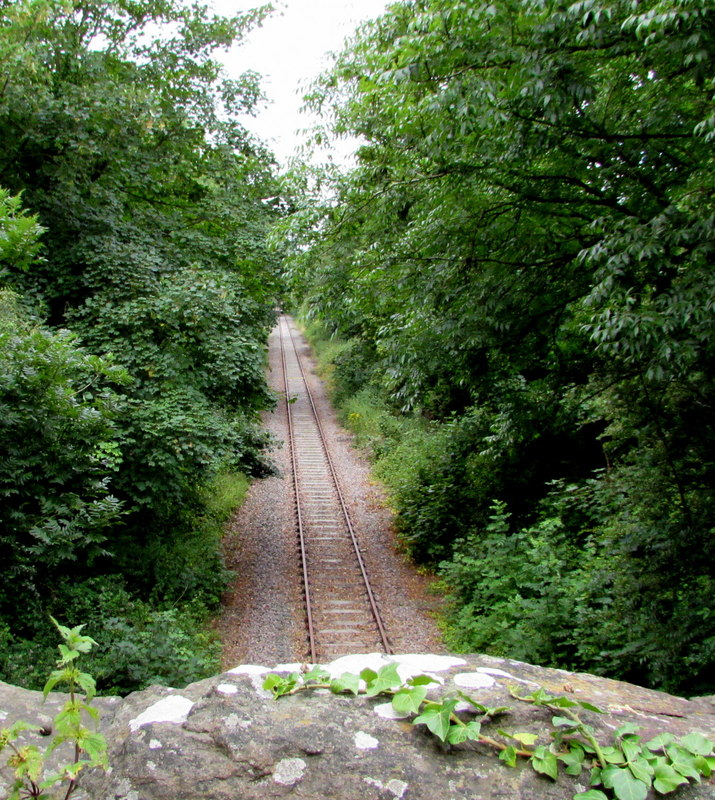
The branch near Iron Acton

The Thornbury branch line is a railway line from Yate to Thornbury in the West of England. From 1963 until mid 2013, it remained as a freight route, serving the quarry at Tytherington. It was designated 'Out of Use (temporary)' by Network Rail from 2013 until 2017, when it reopened to serve Tytherington quarry again. The 7 1/2-mile (12.1 km) branch of the Midland Railway line between Bristol and Gloucester opened on 2 September 1872, and started at Yate and finished at Thornbury, with stops at Iron Acton and Tytherington.

== Train services ==
The line's services first consisted of two trains in each direction per day, connecting at Yate with mainline trains. Later trains appeared to be running from Thornbury down to Bristol Temple Meads, although the services were infrequent. By 1910, there were four trains in each direction every weekday. In 1944 the passenger train was run by a class 1P 0-4-4 tank with three coaches, which spent the night at Thornbury. The journey took 19 to 22 minutes. During World War 2 12-coach trains took wounded to hospital at Thornbury.

== Route ==
The first 1/2 mile (0.80 km) was level. 1 1/2 miles (2.4 km) fell at 1 in 176 (5.7 ‰) to Iron Acton. The climb to Tytherington was at 1 in 86 (11.6 ‰), followed by 1 in 59 (16.9 ‰) to Tytherington Tunnel and a siding to a quarry. The 224-yard (205 m) long tunnel was lined only at the ends and a fall of rock blocked the line for a week in 1956. Beyond the tunnel, railway ballast was supplied by Grovesend Quarry. From the 167-yard (153 m) Grovesend Tunnel the line fell at 1 in 50 (20 ‰) through a limestone cutting to Thornbury.

== Partial closure ==
The 1-mile-7-chain (1.8 km) branch to ironstone mines at Frampton Cotterell was authorised by an act of Parliament of 1865, but the mines failed, and Midland's Way & Works Committee agreed to lift the line at its 15 April 1878 meeting, though it wasn't done until 1892.

On 19 June 1944, the line was closed to passenger traffic. In the 1960s, the stations were demolished, apart from Yate, which was closed with other stations on the Bristol to Gloucester line in 1965 and then re-opened in 1989. The section of track from Tytherington Quarry to Thornbury was dismantled after the closure of the goods depot at Thornbury in 1966.

== Continuing goods traffic and mothballing ==
The rest of the line remained open to goods traffic, serving the Tytherington Quarry with very occasional freight services. Following the cessation of these services and with no near term resumption of traffic expected, the line was designated 'Out of Use (temporary)' beyond milepost 0 mi 30 ch in mid 2013.

The line returned to use in June 2017 following the reopening of the quarry by operators Hanson. An initial test run operated on 4 June 2017, with occasional loaded trains running from the quarry thereafter.

== Future potential reopening ==
Studies into reopening the branch line have been made in a consultation report produced by Halcrow Group in 2014, as well as the November 2015 joint transport study report produced by The West of England Local Enterprise Partnership. In 2013 the estimated cost of this would be £38 million.

Suggestion was made as part of the West of England Combined Authority (Weca) Joint Local Transport Plan to reopen the line along with others in the MetroWest project. However, in 2017 Weca found there would be several challenges in delivering this proposal, as the former rail alignment into Thornbury is now occupied by an industrial estate and there is no practical routing into the town. The station would therefore have to be located on the edge of Thornbury at a significant distance from the town centre, making it less attractive to passengers. The Grovesend tunnel would also need to be reopened, with its current condition unknown, and there would be capacity constraints at Westerleigh Junction. This led to the authority deciding not to pursue reopening the line. FOSBR continue to advocate reopening the line in the future.

In 2020, the line was mentioned by Railway Gazette International as having potential for future funding from the Department for Transport's "Restoring Your Railway" initiative.
