= Tytherington Quarry =

Quarry in Gloucestershire

Coordinates: 51.59702°N 2.48936°W

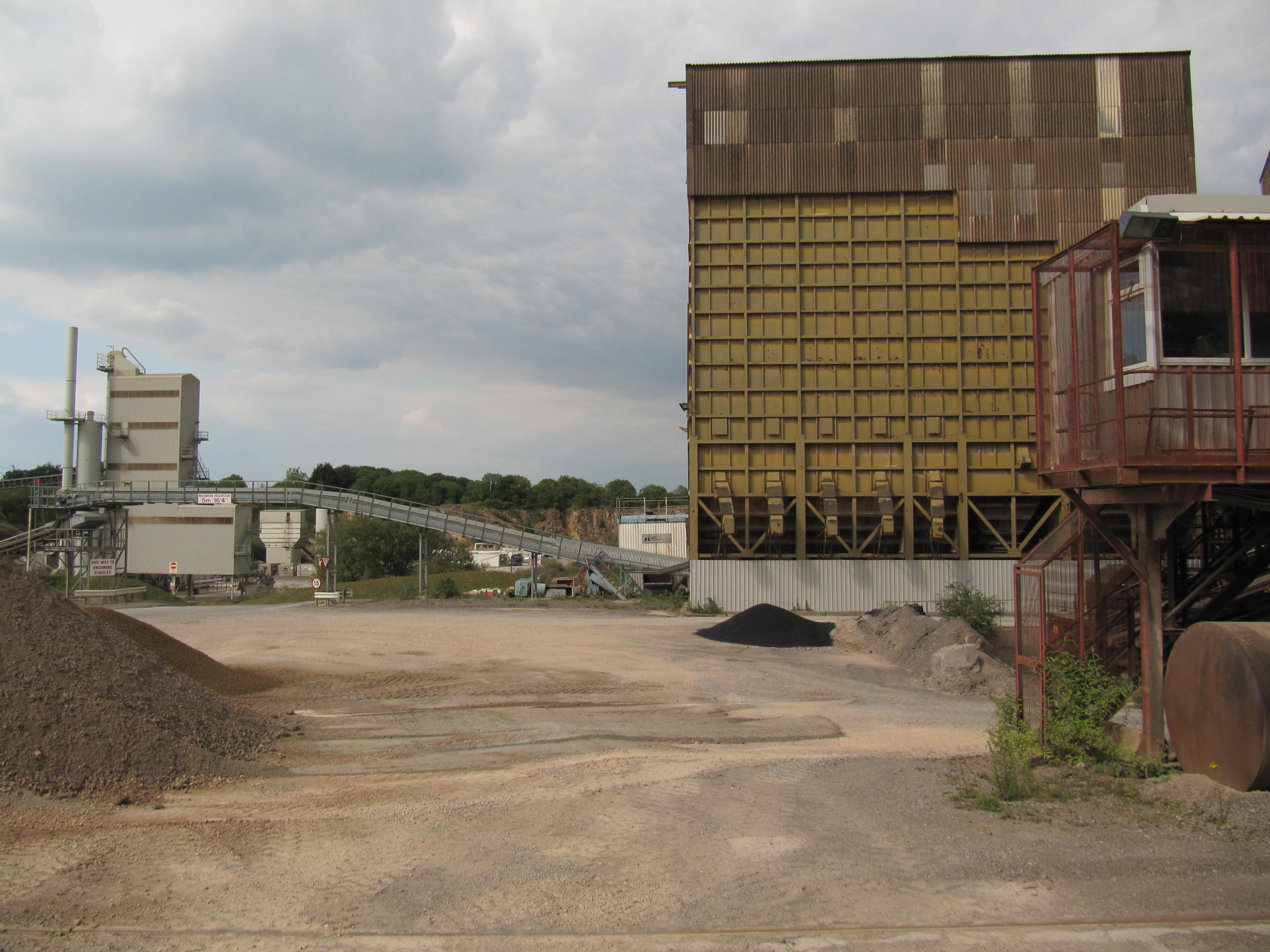
The quarry seen from the railway in 2011

Tytherington Quarry is a 57-hectare (140-acre) working limestone quarry near the village of Tytherington in South Gloucestershire, England. Quarrying began in 1872 and today is operated by the aggregates division of Heidelberg Materials UK. Part of the quarry is disused and designated as a geological Site of Special Scientific Interest (SSSI).

The quarry is connected by rail on the Thornbury branch line. It encompasses three separate pits (from south to north): Woodleaze, Grovesend and North Face. Woodleaze and Grovesend are actively worked and are linked by a tunnel beneath the railway, which runs between them.

North Face pit, to the north of Tytherington Road, is exhausted and partially flooded. It is owned by FCC Environment, after FCC acquired the waste management division of Hanson plc.

== History ==
Quarrying on West Street and behind the church on Tytherington Hill – closer to the village than the present working quarry – began independently with the arrival of the railway in 1872. Howell Lloyd Hardwicke developed these into the Tytherington Stone Company. The company opened Grovesend pit in 1902 to supply stone for the construction of Avonmouth Docks.

Tytherington Stone Company merged with several Somerset quarries in 1934 as Roads Reconstruction (1934) Ltd. This in turn went through a series of mergers and acquisitions into Amalgamated Roadstone Corporation, Consolidated Gold Fields, and Hanson plc, before the latter was acquired by Heidelberg Materials.

== Site of Special Scientific Interest ==
Tytherington Quarry
- Site of Special Scientific Interest
- Location of Tytherington Quarry.
- Area of search: Avon
- Grid reference: ST662888
- Interest: Geological
- Area: 0.9 ha (2.2 acres)
- Notification date: 1989
- Location map: English Nature

Within the North Face pit, an area of 0.9 hectares (2.2 acres) is designated as a geological SSSI. It was notified in 1989 as a "key site in studies of late Triassic vertebrate biotas". The SSSI contains fissure fill from the Rhaetian age, from which fossils of seven reptile species were found, including the discovery of the new genus Diphydontosaurus.
