= Tytherington, Gloucestershire =

Village in Gloucestershire, England

Coordinates: 51.59620°N 2.47059°W

Tytherington
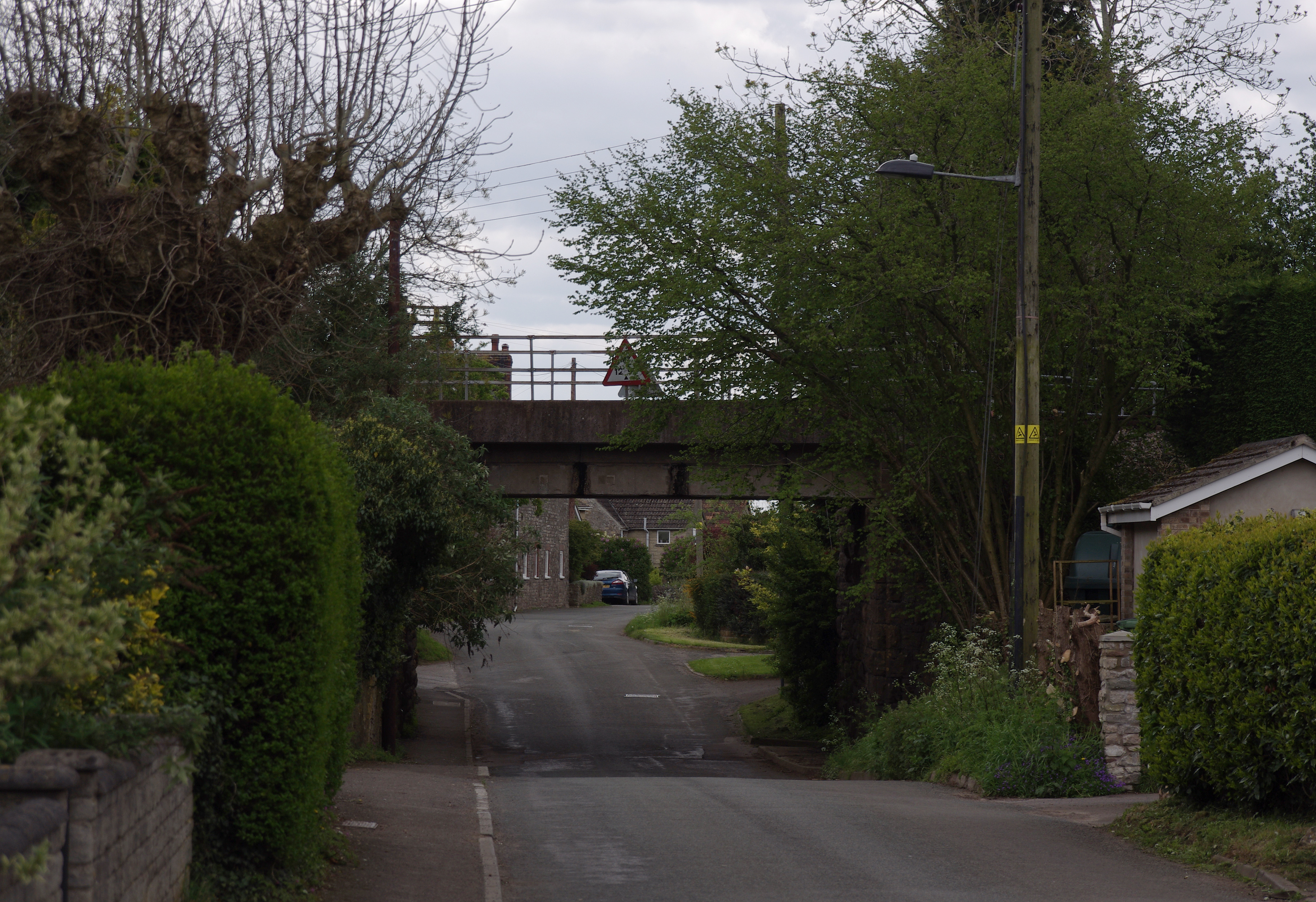
- The Thornbury Branch Line bridge in the village

- Location within Gloucestershire
- Civil parish: Tytherington and Itchington
- Unitary authority: South Gloucestershire
- Ceremonial county: Gloucestershire
- Region: South West
- Country: England
- Sovereign state: United Kingdom

Tytherington is a village in South Gloucestershire, England, 2 miles (3.2 km) south east of Thornbury. The population at the 2011 census was 666.

To the west of the village is Tytherington Quarry, a 57 hectares (140 acres) limestone quarry incorporating two active workings, operated by Hanson plc, and a disused working now designated as a Site of Special Scientific Interest.

The former Yate to Thornbury railway branch line passes through the south of the village, with two bridges in the village and a tank engine near the quarry entrance as reminders of the railway. The line now ends at the quarry and is used for the transport of stone, but used to continue through a tunnel under the A38, to Thornbury. Tytherington had its own small station on the single track line: it opened in 1872 and closed to passengers in 1944. The M5 motorway runs along the north west fringe of the village.

To the north-east of the village stands Tytherington Hill (grid reference ST675887), with views east to the Cotswold Edge, and to the north are Cutts Heath and Milbury Heath.

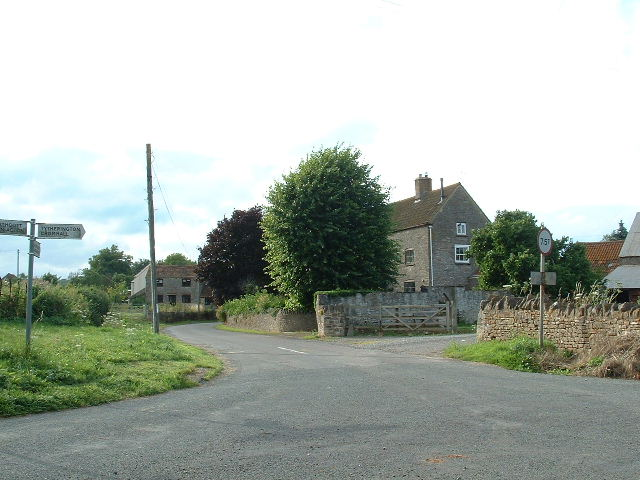
Itchington. Village centre looking NW near NE corner of square

To the south of Tytherington is the hamlet of Itchington which includes an old lime works, which is now at the centre of a small development of 18 new homes.

== Sport and leisure ==
Tytherington has a non-League football club Tytherington Rocks F.C. who play at Hardwicke Playing Field in the Gloucestershire County League
