= Grade II* listed buildings in South Gloucestershire =

There are over 20,000 Grade II* listed buildings in England. This page is a list of these buildings in the district of South Gloucestershire in Gloucestershire.

== South Gloucestershire ==
Name	Location	Type	Completed (Note: The date given is the date used by Historic England as significant for the initial building or that of an important part in the structure's description.)	Date designated	Grid ref. (Note: The grid reference is based on the British national grid reference system, sometimes known as OSGB36, used by the Ordnance Survey.) Geo-coordinates	Entry number (Note: The "List Entry Number" is a unique number assigned to each listed building and scheduled monument by Historic England.)	Image
Parish Church of St Mary	Acton Turville, South Gloucestershire	Parish Church	12th century	3 March 1961	ST8084480865; 51°31′35″N 2°16′39″W	1155143	Parish Church of St Mary More images
Archway to over Court	Over, Almondsbury, South Gloucestershire	Gate Lodge	Mid 18th century	5 December 1984	ST5869182309; 51°32′17″N 2°35′49″W	1321097	Upload Photo
Bishop's Farmhouse	Compton Greenfield, Almondsbury, South Gloucestershire	Farmhouse	Late 16th century	5 December 1984	ST5688781862; 51°32′02″N 2°37′23″W	1128857	Upload Photo
Church of All Saints	Compton Greenfield, Almondsbury, South Gloucestershire	Parish Church	c. 1170	30 March 1960	ST5708682226; 51°32′14″N 2°37′12″W	1321095	Church of All Saints More images
The Manor House	Gaunt's Earthcott, Almondsbury, South Gloucestershire	Farmhouse	16th century	21 October 1952	ST6351284200; 51°33′20″N 2°31′40″W	1128866	Upload Photo
Church of St John	Aust, South Gloucestershire	Parish Church	15th century	5 December 1984	ST5724389081; 51°35′56″N 2°37′07″W	1136359	Church of St John More images
Church of St John	Elberton, Aust, South Gloucestershire	Parish Church	14th century	30 March 1960	ST6023488188; 51°35′28″N 2°34′32″W	1136391	Church of St John More images
Church of St Mary of Malmesbury	Littleton-upon-Severn, Aust, South Gloucestershire	Parish Church	14th century	30 March 1960	ST6006890226; 51°36′34″N 2°34′41″W	1312787	Church of St Mary of Malmesbury More images
Corston Farmhouse	Littleton Upon Severn, Aust, South Gloucestershire	Farmhouse	Early 17th century	21 October 1952	ST5985290244; 51°36′35″N 2°34′52″W	1136474	Upload Photo
Badminton House Servants Wing, adjoining and immediately to the South West of Badminton House	Badminton Park, Badminton, South Gloucestershire	Servants' Wing	1841	10 November 1983	ST8060182858; 51°32′39″N 2°16′52″W	1129318	Upload Photo
Castle Barn, flanking Dovecotes and Screen Walls	The Tyning, Badminton, South Gloucestershire	House	C20	10 November 1983	ST7928482702; 51°32′34″N 2°18′00″W	1129344	Castle Barn, flanking Dovecotes and Screen Walls More images
Essex House, and front Boundary Walls and Gate Piers	Badminton, South Gloucestershire	House	c. 1700	17 September 1952	ST8047782683; 51°32′34″N 2°16′58″W	1155409	Essex House, and front Boundary Walls and Gate Piers More images
Hermit's Cell the Root House	Badminton Park, Badminton, South Gloucestershire	Root House	c. 1750	10 November 1983	ST8113483850; 51°33′12″N 2°16′25″W	1320851	Hermit's Cell the Root House More images
Laundry and Dairy House 30 Yards to West of Badminton House	Badminton Park, Badminton, South Gloucestershire	House	1983	10 November 1983	ST8058882945; 51°32′42″N 2°16′53″W	1129315	Laundry and Dairy House 30 Yards to West of Badminton House More images
Lower Slait Lodge	Badminton Park, Badminton, South Gloucestershire	Lodge	c. 1750	17 September 1952	ST7982083828; 51°33′11″N 2°17′33″W	1129323	Lower Slait Lodge More images
Orangery, 50 Yards to South East of Church of St Michael and All Angels	Badminton Park, Badminton, South Gloucestershire	Orangery	1711	17 September 1952	ST8070682807; 51°32′38″N 2°16′47″W	1129313	Upload Photo
Pair of Cottages 20m to the West of Almshouses, Boundary Walls to Road and Gate Piers	Badminton, South Gloucestershire	Estate Cottage	Early 18th century	3 March 1961	ST8039682672; 51°32′33″N 2°17′03″W	1129329	Upload Photo
Park Keepers House and Workshop Wing to East	Badminton Park, Badminton, South Gloucestershire	Estate Cottage	c. 1750	10 November 1983	ST8042583945; 51°33′15″N 2°17′01″W	1155297	Park Keepers House and Workshop Wing to East More images
Pond Cottage, 30m to South West of Badminton House	Badminton Park, Badminton, South Gloucestershire	House	1983	10 November 1983	ST8057182893; 51°32′41″N 2°16′54″W	1129316	Upload Photo
Single Storey Ranges, Barn and Covered Way enclosing Four Sides of Courtyard at Stable Court to Badminton House	Badminton Park, Badminton, South Gloucestershire	Gate	1878	10 November 1983	ST8050682835; 51°32′39″N 2°16′57″W	1320860	Upload Photo
The Almshouse and former School and Boundary Walls and Gate Piers to the Road	Badminton, South Gloucestershire	Almshouses	c1707-09	3 March 1961	ST8043382678; 51°32′34″N 2°17′01″W	1129328	The Almshouse and former School and Boundary Walls and Gate Piers to the Road More images
The Thatched Cottage	Badminton, South Gloucestershire	Cottage Ornee	c. 1750	10 November 1983	ST8042082320; 51°32′22″N 2°17′01″W	1129341	The Thatched Cottage More images
Two Houses immediately to the West of the Almshouses and Boundary Walls to Road	Badminton, South Gloucestershire	Estate Cottage	Early 18th century	3 March 1961	ST8040782674; 51°32′33″N 2°17′02″W	1155417	Upload Photo
Church Farmhouse	Bitton, South Gloucestershire	Farmhouse	Mid 19th century	15 July 1981	ST6817069411; 51°25′22″N 2°27′33″W	1319783	Upload Photo
Londonderry Farmhouse	Bitton, South Gloucestershire	Farmhouse	1672	11 May 1953	ST6637469878; 51°25′37″N 2°29′06″W	1116793	Upload Photo
The Grange, Gates and Gate Piers at the South East Corner of the Grange	Bitton, South Gloucestershire	House	17th century	11 May 1953	ST6818769312; 51°25′19″N 2°27′32″W	1116812	Upload Photo
Hamswell House	Hamswell, Cold Ashton, South Gloucestershire	Farmhouse	17th century	17 September 1952	ST7319271498; 51°26′31″N 2°23′14″W	1220723	Hamswell House More images
Church of St Peter	Wapley, Dodington, South Gloucestershire	Parish Church	13th century	15 August 1985	ST7138079725; 51°30′57″N 2°24′50″W	1211521	Church of St Peter More images
Codrington Court	Codrington, Dodington, South Gloucestershire	Farmhouse	16th century	17 September 1952	ST7277778536; 51°30′18″N 2°23′37″W	1220995	Upload Photo
The Cascade Building about 80m North East of Dodington House and Railings	Dodington Park, Dodington, South Gloucestershire	Gate	1764	17 September 1952	ST7531779939; 51°31′04″N 2°21′26″W	1211179	Upload Photo
Church of Holy Trinity	Doynton, South Gloucestershire	Parish Church	12th century	15 August 1985	ST7205574113; 51°27′55″N 2°24′13″W	1211665	Church of Holy Trinity More images
Statue of Neptune About 320m East of Dyrham House	Dyrham Park, Dyrham and Hinton, South Gloucestershire	Statue	between 1700 and 1712	17 September 1952	ST7444075665; 51°28′46″N 2°22′10″W	1212355	Statue of Neptune About 320m East of Dyrham House More images
Church of St Peter	Frampton Cotterell, South Gloucestershire	Anglican Church	1858	25 September 1985	ST6675882002; 51°32′09″N 2°28′50″W	1136248	Church of St Peter More images
Blocks 1 and 2 and linking Arcade to Hanham Hall Hospital	Hanham Abbots, South Gloucestershire	House	1655	15 July 1981	ST6444071634; 51°26′33″N 2°30′47″W	1278348	Upload Photo
Hanham Court	Hanham Green, Hanham Abbots, South Gloucestershire	House	Late Victorian-Early C20	11 May 1953	ST6493870267; 51°25′49″N 2°30′21″W	1319770	Hanham Court More images
Parish Church of St George	Hanham Green, Hanham Abbots, South Gloucestershire	Church	Earlier	11 May 1953	ST6496870274; 51°25′49″N 2°30′19″W	1116822	Parish Church of St George More images
Tithe Barn to North of Hanham Court	Hanham Green, Hanham Abbots, South Gloucestershire	Tithe Barn	probably 15th century	11 May 1953	ST6494670306; 51°25′50″N 2°30′20″W	1116823	Upload Photo
Coach House, Stables and Pigsty 40m to North of Swangrove House	Swangrove, Hawkesbury, South Gloucestershire	Garage	1983	17 September 1952	ST7967985847; 51°34′16″N 2°17′41″W	1129381	Upload Photo
Dovecote	Little Badminton Green, Hawkesbury, South Gloucestershire	Dovecote	late medieval	17 September 1952	ST8009884108; 51°33′20″N 2°17′18″W	1303080	Dovecote More images
Monument to Lord Robert Edward Somerset	Hawkesbury Upton, Hawkesbury, South Gloucestershire	Tower	1846	10 November 1983	ST7722787649; 51°35′14″N 2°19′48″W	1320834	Monument to Lord Robert Edward Somerset More images
Ragged Castle or Keeper's Lodge	Hawkesbury, South Gloucestershire	Garden Building	c. 1750	10 November 1983	ST8050086093; 51°34′24″N 2°16′58″W	1156209	Upload Photo
Church of St Michael	Hill, South Gloucestershire	Parish Church	13th century	30 March 1960	ST6494295232; 51°39′17″N 2°30′29″W	1136564	Church of St Michael More images
Mudgedown Farmhouse	Iron Acton, South Gloucestershire	Farmhouse	Mid 17th century	17 September 1952	ST6840585060; 51°33′49″N 2°27′26″W	1116018	Upload Photo
Rodway Hill Manor (East and West Wing)	Mangotsfield Rural, South Gloucestershire	House	Later	11 May 1953	ST6634675828; 51°28′49″N 2°29′10″W	1116174	Upload Photo
Barn, 25m to North of Home Farmhouse	Marshfield, South Gloucestershire	Barn	17th century OR EARLY 18th century	17 September 1952	ST7816273765; 51°27′45″N 2°18′57″W	1320825	Upload Photo
Crispe Almshouses and Chapel	Marshfield, South Gloucestershire	Almshouse	1612-1619	17 September 1952	ST7739073771; 51°27′45″N 2°19′37″W	1302631	Crispe Almshouses and Chapel More images
Walls and Archway to the front of the Almshouses	Marshfield, South Gloucestershire	Wall and Gate	1612-1619	10 November 1983	ST7738973762; 51°27′45″N 2°19′37″W	1320796	Walls and Archway to the front of the Almshouses
Dovecote, 5m to North-west of the Old Manor House	Marshfield, South Gloucestershire	Dovecote	C16/C17	17 September 1952	ST7815273737; 51°27′44″N 2°18′57″W	1156549	Upload Photo
Marshfield House	Marshfield, South Gloucestershire	House	Late 17th century	17 September 1952	ST7809273635; 51°27′41″N 2°19′00″W	1302595	Marshfield House More images
The Catherine Wheel	Marshfield, South Gloucestershire	Public House	1680/1690	17 September 1952	ST7794273713; 51°27′43″N 2°19′08″W	1114934	The Catherine Wheel More images
The Manor	Marshfield, South Gloucestershire	House	17th century	17 September 1952	ST7819773717; 51°27′43″N 2°18′55″W	1302923	Upload Photo
The Old Meeting House	Marshfield, South Gloucestershire	Unitarian Chapel	1752	17 September 1952	ST7777273700; 51°27′43″N 2°19′17″W	1157006	Upload Photo
123, High Street	Marshfield, South Gloucestershire	House	Early 18th century	17 September 1952	ST7757973726; 51°27′43″N 2°19′27″W	1114944	Upload Photo
14, High Street	Marshfield, South Gloucestershire	House	Mid 18th century	17 September 1952	ST7804473735; 51°27′44″N 2°19′03″W	1129418	Upload Photo
Church of St Arilda	Oldbury-on-Severn, South Gloucestershire	Parish Church	15th century	30 March 1960	ST6083891904; 51°37′28″N 2°34′02″W	1128916	Church of St Arilda More images
Fewster's Farmhouse	Kington, Oldbury-upon-Severn, South Gloucestershire	Farmhouse	15th century	21 September 1952	ST6201190345; 51°36′38″N 2°33′00″W	1128813	Upload Photo
Church of St Mary	Olveston, South Gloucestershire	Parish Church	late Norman	30 March 1960	ST6007187286; 51°34′59″N 2°34′40″W	1128929	Church of St Mary More images
Hill House	Olveston, South Gloucestershire	Farmhouse	Early 16th century	21 October 1952	ST5998886791; 51°34′43″N 2°34′44″W	1128935	Upload Photo
Olveston Court	Olveston, South Gloucestershire	Farmhouse	earlier than 19th century	21 October 1952	ST5986487054; 51°34′51″N 2°34′50″W	1128927	Upload Photo
Severn Tunnel East Portal (BSW1101)	Pilning and Severn Beach, South Gloucestershire	Railway Tunnel Portal	1886	17 July 2012	ST5453885432; 51°33′57″N 2°39′26″W	1409175	Severn Tunnel East Portal (BSW1101)
Dennisworth Farmhouse	Pucklechurch, South Gloucestershire	Farmhouse	Late 17th century	17 September 1952	ST6940576027; 51°28′57″N 2°26′31″W	1289567	Upload Photo
Lyde Green Farmhouse	Lyde Green, Pucklechurch, South Gloucestershire	Farmhouse	mid-late 17th century	17 September 1952	ST6845377789; 51°29′53″N 2°27′21″W	1289408	Upload Photo
Moat House	Pucklechurch, South Gloucestershire	Farmhouse	17th century	17 September 1952	ST6970076714; 51°29′19″N 2°26′16″W	1212368	Upload Photo
The Grey House	Pucklechurch, South Gloucestershire	House	1678	17 September 1952	ST6964076590; 51°29′15″N 2°26′19″W	1212709	Upload Photo
Bagstone Court Farmhouse and Bakehouse 2m to South East	Bagstone, Rangeworthy, South Gloucestershire	Farmhouse	14th century	5 June 1984	ST6901386891; 51°34′48″N 2°26′55″W	1137100	Upload Photo
Church of the Holy Trinity	Rangeworthy, South Gloucestershire	Anglican Church	1851	30 March 1960	ST6866186248; 51°34′27″N 2°27′13″W	1116020	Church of the Holy Trinity More images
Rangeworthy Court	Rangeworthy, South Gloucestershire	House	Early 17th century	21 October 1952	ST6868286277; 51°34′28″N 2°27′12″W	1291208	Rangeworthy Court More images
Church of St Oswald	Rockhampton, South Gloucestershire	Parish Church	14th century	30 March 1960	ST6549593294; 51°38′15″N 2°30′00″W	1128960	Church of St Oswald More images
Little Brook Farmhouse	Goose Green, Siston, South Gloucestershire	Farmhouse	late 17th century or early 18th century	3 April 1981	ST6753974324; 51°28′01″N 2°28′07″W	1231436	Upload Photo
Lodges to Siston Court	Siston Village, Siston, South Gloucestershire	Gate Lodge	Early 19th century	11 May 1953	ST6880675385; 51°28′36″N 2°27′02″W	1231513	Lodges to Siston Court More images
Warmley House and Stable Block	Siston, South Gloucestershire	House	Mid 18th century	11 May 1953	ST6694672869; 51°27′14″N 2°28′38″W	1278069	Upload Photo
Bank House	Chipping Sodbury, South Gloucestershire	House	Post World War Two	17 September 1952	ST7268682192; 51°32′17″N 2°23′43″W	1135952	Upload Photo
Blanchard's Farmhouse	Chipping Sodbury, South Gloucestershire	Farmhouse	15th century	29 July 1983	ST7378381756; 51°32′03″N 2°22′46″W	1129236	Upload Photo
Home Farmhouse	Old Sodbury, Sodbury, South Gloucestershire	Farmhouse	Early-mid 17th century	17 September 1952	ST7558681073; 51°31′41″N 2°21′12″W	1320892	Upload Photo
Lyegrove House	Lyegrove, Sodbury, South Gloucestershire	House	Early 17th century	17 September 1952	ST7764581674; 51°32′01″N 2°19′25″W	1136069	Upload Photo
North Gateway to Dodington Park, Sites, Quadrant Walls and Chippenham Lodge and Terrace Walls	Old Sodbury, Sodbury, South Gloucestershire	Gate Lodge	Extension	17 September 1952	ST7596780931; 51°31′36″N 2°20′52″W	1135785	Upload Photo
Parish Church of St John the Baptist	Old Sodbury, Chipping Sodbury, South Gloucestershire	Parish Church	Norman	29 July 1983	ST7555781803; 51°32′05″N 2°21′14″W	1320899	Parish Church of St John the Baptist More images
The George Hotel	Chipping Sodbury, South Gloucestershire	Inn Sign	18th century	17 September 1952	ST7284382238; 51°32′18″N 2°23′35″W	1313103	The George Hotel More images
The Grapes Hotel	Chipping Sodbury, South Gloucestershire	Hotel	16th century	17 September 1952	ST7251382230; 51°32′18″N 2°23′52″W	1320881	The Grapes Hotel More images
Tudor House	Sodbury, South Gloucestershire	House	Later	17 September 1952	ST7296982281; 51°32′20″N 2°23′28″W	1135891	Tudor House More images
19 High Street	Sodbury, South Gloucestershire	House	Early 18th century	17 September 1952	ST7264182244; 51°32′18″N 2°23′45″W	1129263	19 High Street More images
86 Broad Street	Sodbury, South Gloucestershire	House	19th century	17 September 1952	ST7292282210; 51°32′17″N 2°23′31″W	1129254	Upload Photo
84 Broad Street	Sodbury, South Gloucestershire	House	Modern	17 September 1952	ST7291782210; 51°32′17″N 2°23′31″W	1129253	Upload Photo
17 High Street	Sodbury, South Gloucestershire	House	early-mid 17th century	17 September 1952	ST7262682239; 51°32′18″N 2°23′46″W	1135914	17 High Street More images
28 High Street	Sodbury, South Gloucestershire	House	C18/C19	29 July 1983	ST7270582181; 51°32′16″N 2°23′42″W	1313017	Upload Photo
1 High Street	Sodbury, South Gloucestershire	House	Late 17th century	17 September 1952	ST7257182231; 51°32′18″N 2°23′49″W	1313068	1 High Street
15 High Street	Sodbury, South Gloucestershire	House	early-mid 17th century	17 September 1952	ST7262082246; 51°32′18″N 2°23′46″W	1320901	15 High Street
26 High Street	Sodbury, South Gloucestershire	House	16th century	17 September 1952	ST7269482186; 51°32′16″N 2°23′42″W	1320906	Upload Photo
29 Horse Street	Sodbury, South Gloucestershire	House	Mid 18th century	17 September 1952	ST7297682162; 51°32′16″N 2°23′28″W	1129279	29 Horse Street More images
11 High Street	Sodbury, South Gloucestershire	House	Early 17th century	17 September 1952	ST7261382238; 51°32′18″N 2°23′47″W	1313032	Upload Photo
Church of St Michael	Stoke Gifford, South Gloucestershire	Anglican Church	Mid 18th century	26 June 1984	ST6226179707; 51°30′54″N 2°32′43″W	1128831	Church of St Michael More images
Dower House	Stoke Park, Stoke Gifford, South Gloucestershire	Country House	c. 1760	26 June 1984	ST6223377251; 51°29′35″N 2°32′43″W	1136240	Dower House More images
Bristol and West Building Society	Thornbury, South Gloucestershire	House	late C18/early 19th century	21 September 1952	ST6365889969; 51°36′27″N 2°31′34″W	1136819	Upload Photo
Clematis Cottage	Thornbury, South Gloucestershire	House	16th century	21 September 1952	ST6359790307; 51°36′37″N 2°31′38″W	1312688	Upload Photo
Morton Grange	Upper Morton, Thornbury, South Gloucestershire	House	1594	17 December 1984	ST6493291385; 51°37′13″N 2°30′29″W	1128792	Morton Grange More images
Porch House	Thornbury, South Gloucestershire	House	Late 16th century	30 March 1960	ST6360990271; 51°36′36″N 2°31′37″W	1321130	Upload Photo
The Priory	Thornbury, South Gloucestershire	House	15th century	21 September 1952	ST6358990316; 51°36′38″N 2°31′38″W	1128787	Upload Photo
Old Manor House	West Littleton, Tormarton, South Gloucestershire	House	c. 1500	15 August 1985	ST7620775467; 51°28′40″N 2°20′38″W	1288609	Upload Photo
Churchyard Cross 7m North of Porch of St Leonard's Church	Tortworth, South Gloucestershire	Cross	14th century	5 June 1984	ST7043393353; 51°38′18″N 2°25′43″W	1115014	Upload Photo
Leyhill Officers' Training School	Tortworth Park, Tortworth, South Gloucestershire	Country House	1849-1853	5 June 1984	ST6933192514; 51°37′50″N 2°26′40″W	1136903	Leyhill Officers' Training School More images
Parish Church of St Leonard	Tortworth, South Gloucestershire	Anglican Church	1872	5 June 1984	ST7043293335; 51°38′17″N 2°25′43″W	1115013	Parish Church of St Leonard More images
Church of St James	Tytherington, South Gloucestershire	Anglican Church	1884	25 September 1985	ST6685688374; 51°35′36″N 2°28′47″W	1321032	Church of St James More images
Church of St Saviour	Coalpit Heath, Westerleigh, South Gloucestershire	Parish Church	1844-5	18 November 1981	ST6737280760; 51°31′29″N 2°28′18″W	1288167	Church of St Saviour More images
Lychgate and attached Walls about 30m East of Church of St Saviour	Coalpit Heath, Westerleigh, South Gloucestershire	Lych Gate	1844-5	18 November 1981	ST6738180709; 51°31′28″N 2°28′18″W	1288247	Lychgate and attached Walls about 30m East of Church of St Saviour
Old Vicarage	Coalpit Heath, Westerleigh, South Gloucestershire	House	1900	18 November 1981	ST6728580738; 51°31′29″N 2°28′23″W	1288128	Upload Photo
Church of St Bartholomew	Wick and Abson, South Gloucestershire	Parish Church	1845	15 August 1985	ST6963472754; 51°27′11″N 2°26′18″W	1216152	Church of St Bartholomew More images
Coachhouse and Stables 15m to North East of Oxwick Farmhouse	Wickwar, South Gloucestershire	Tack Room	1722	17 September 1952	ST7220685947; 51°34′18″N 2°24′09″W	1312305	Upload Photo
Frith Farmhouse and Bakehouse at South East	Wickwar, South Gloucestershire	Farmhouse	17th century	17 September 1952	ST7178287361; 51°35′04″N 2°24′31″W	1128768	Frith Farmhouse and Bakehouse at South East More images
Oxwick Farmhouse	Wickwar, South Gloucestershire	Farmhouse	1722	17 September 1952	ST7218885905; 51°34′17″N 2°24′10″W	1321124	Oxwick Farmhouse
Parish Church of the Holy Trinity	Wickwar, South Gloucestershire	Anglican Church	c. 1881	3 March 1961	ST7234888921; 51°35′54″N 2°24′02″W	1137110	Parish Church of the Holy Trinity More images
Court Farm Barn	Winterbourne, South Gloucestershire	Barn	16th century or earlier	12 February 1979	ST6411680931; 51°31′34″N 2°31′07″W	1128852	Court Farm Barn More images
Faber's Farmhouse	Hambrook, Winterbourne, South Gloucestershire	Farmhouse	Late Medieval	17 September 1952	ST6383378859; 51°30′27″N 2°31′21″W	1276726	Upload Photo
Frenchay Manor	Frenchay, Winterbourne, South Gloucestershire	House	1736	17 September 1952	ST6412478108; 51°30′03″N 2°31′06″W	1128838	Frenchay Manor More images
Moorend Farmhouse	Moorend, Winterbourne, South Gloucestershire	Farmhouse	1676	17 September 1952	ST6510878994; 51°30′32″N 2°30′15″W	1276739	Upload Photo
Unitarian Chapel	Frenchay, Winterbourne, South Gloucestershire	Unitarian Chapel	1720	3 March 1961	ST6397277592; 51°29′46″N 2°31′13″W	1233019	Unitarian Chapel More images
Church of St James	Mangotsfield, South Gloucestershire	Parish Church	13th century	24 April 1951	ST6644876177; 51°29′01″N 2°29′04″W	1116192	Church of St James More images
Hill House	Mangotsfield, South Gloucestershire	House	c. 1700	24 April 1951	ST6570576050; 51°28′56″N 2°29′43″W	1320081	Upload Photo
Parish Church of the Holy Trinity and Churchyard Walls Fronting Street and on West, Running Southwards for Approximately 100 Yards	Kingswood, South Gloucestershire	Church	1821	6 June 1951	ST6509473800; 51°27′44″N 2°30′14″W	1319749	Parish Church of the Holy Trinity and Churchyard Walls Fronting Street and on West, Running Southwards for Approximately 100 Yards More images
