= Petty France, Gloucestershire =

Hamlet in South Gloucestershire, England

Coordinates: 51.568°N 2.309°W

Petty France
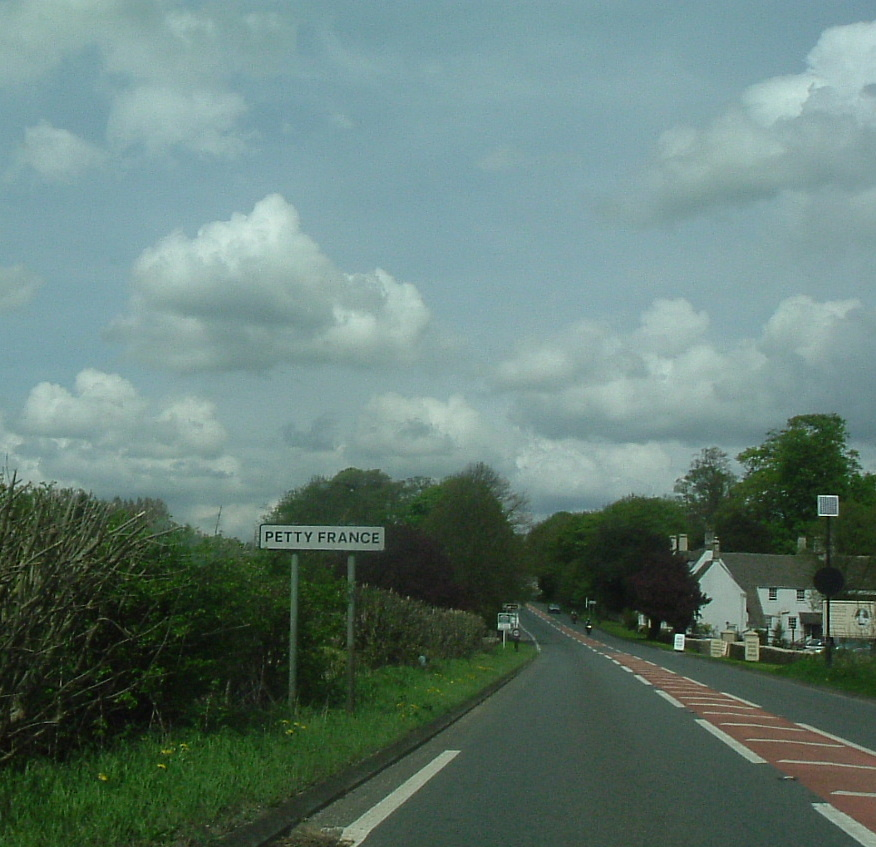
- Entering Petty France from the south along the A46

- Location within Gloucestershire
- Civil parish: Hawkesbury
- Unitary authority: South Gloucestershire
- Ceremonial county: Gloucestershire
- Region: South West
- Country: England
- Sovereign state: United Kingdom
- Post town: BADMINTON
- Postcode district: GL9
- Dialling code: 01454
- Police: Avon and Somerset
- Fire: Avon
- Ambulance: South Western
- UK Parliament: Thornbury and Yate

Petty France is a hamlet within Hawkesbury civil parish in South Gloucestershire, England. It is on the A46, which runs from Bath, to Nailsworth and Stroud, just south of another, slightly smaller hamlet, Dunkirk. Badminton and Hawkesbury Upton are also nearby.

The Manor House in Petty France was built in 1812 for Robert Jenkinson, 2nd Earl of Liverpool, prime minister from 1812 to 1827. The house has seen the likes of Lord Wellington, and has been in the ownership of the poet Wordsworth's family, Lord and Lady Apsley and the Duke of Beaufort; today it is a hotel.

== Road accidents ==
In 2002, Petty France and Dunkirk were known as road accident hotspots. According to the council's accident database, the proportion of fatal and serious accidents was 46%, significantly higher than the average for South Gloucestershire as a whole, which was 12%. 13 accidents occurred between 1 January 1998 and 31 December 2001, of which two were fatal, four others were classified as serious, and seven were slight. As a result of this, the speed through the two hamlets was reduced to 40 MPH.

== Cultural references ==
In her novel Northanger Abbey (written in 1803, but not published until 1817), Jane Austen mentions Petty France as a dull two-hour rest stop on the road between Bath and the fictional abbey: "There was nothing to be done but to eat without being hungry, and to loiter about without anything to see."
