= Hawkesbury Upton =

Village in Gloucestershire, England

Coordinates: 51.581°N 2.319°W

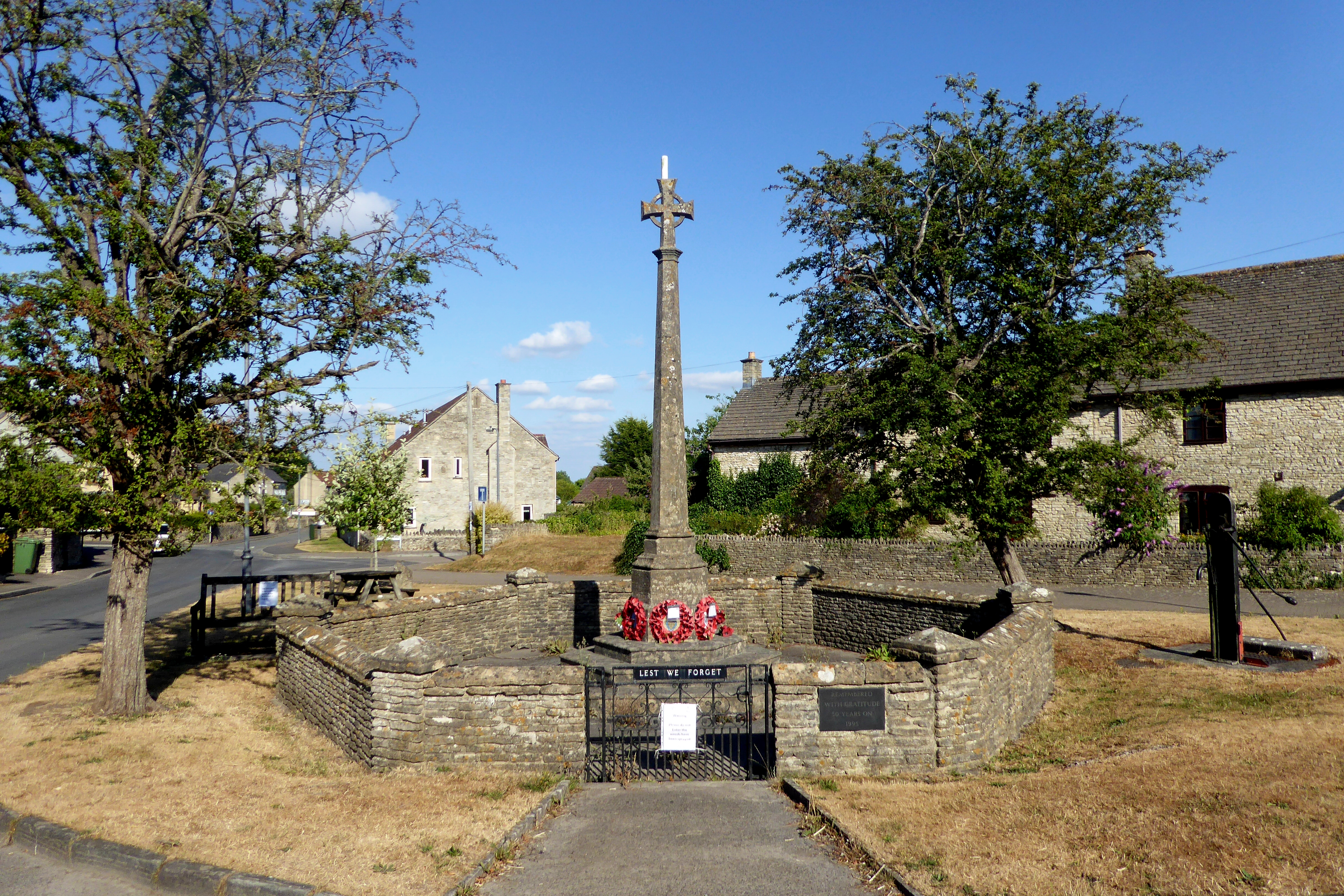
- War Memorial, Hawkesbury Upton

- Location within Gloucestershire
- Population: c. 1,200
- OS grid reference: ST780870
- Civil parish: Hawkesbury
- Unitary authority: South Gloucestershire
- Ceremonial county: Gloucestershire
- Region: South West
- Country: England
- Sovereign state: United Kingdom
- Post town: Badminton
- Postcode district: GL9
- Dialling code: 01454
- Police: Avon and Somerset
- Fire: Avon
- Ambulance: South Western
- UK Parliament: Thornbury and Yate
- Website: Parish Council

Hawkesbury Upton is a village in South Gloucestershire, England, east of the much smaller Hawkesbury. It lies north of Horton, east of Dunkirk and south of Alderley and Hillesley.

Hawkesbury Upton is close to the A46 road. The village lies on the Cotswold Way and exhibits many of the characteristics of a Cotswold village, including use of the local limestone in the majority of the buildings.

There is a village hall with a recreation ground and a cricket club.

On the last Saturday in August, the annual Hawkesbury Horticultural Show takes place at the village hall and recreation ground. There is entertainment in the arena, a carnival procession, fairground rides and local craft, trade and charity stalls. The show has run continuously since 1885, although the 2020 show was postponed due to the COVID-19 pandemic in the United Kingdom.

== Somerset Monument ==
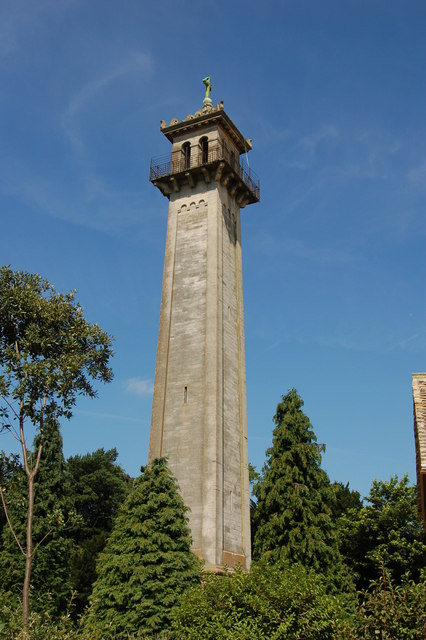
The Somerset Monument

The Somerset Monument stands on the Cotswold Edge escarpment, about half a mile from the village on the road towards Hillesley. Built in ashlar and designed by Lewis Vulliamy, it was constructed in 1846 as a memorial to Lord Edward Somerset, who led the British cavalry at the Battle of Waterloo. The monument is a slightly tapering square tower, about 100 feet (30 m) high.

The first keeper of the monument was Shadrack Byfield, a one-armed veteran of the Anglo-American War of 1812. Byfield, a native of Bradford on Avon in Wiltshire, lived in Hawkesbury Upton from 1843 to 1856.

== Hawkesbury Stallions Football Club ==
The village was also home to a football club, the Hawkesbury Stallions. The club was founded by villagers Simon Warren and Ollie Gillman in 2009, after the previous iteration of the side collapsed some years earlier. The club, which played at the hallowed Ben Stiles Recreation Ground, were due to play in Stroud and District League Division 6 when they folded in 2014.

=== 2009–10 season ===
The Stallions spent their first two seasons in the basement of the English football league system, Stroud and District League Division 8. With a team of mostly 16 and 17-year-olds, guided by centre half Clive Warren, the Stallions let in 80 goals including a 13-1 defeat to Avonvale United 3rds in their second competitive match, away to Tetbury. Sixteen supporters were in attendance for the Stallions' first league game, a 5-6 home defeat to Stroud Imperial Reserves a week earlier at The Rec. The Stallions finished 10th out of 12 that season, not helped by a controversial docking of points for failing to field a side against Sharpness 3rds on Easter Monday, when many players refused to play for religious reasons.

=== 2010–11 season ===
Another 10th place finish in the league followed for the Stallions in their second season, with the club going through a transition period as many of their original players left the village for university and work.

=== 2011–12 season ===
The Stallions achieved promotion to Division 7 after finishing second in Division 8, narrowly missing out on the title after finishing one point behind Trident. The season also saw the Stallions achieve their biggest win in their five-year history: a 19-0 away win over Alkerton Rangers Reserves, who finished the season with -1 points.

=== 2012–13 season ===
The 2012-13 season was a story of revenge, with the Stallions hammering Avonvale United 3rds 13-1 in an exact reversal of their second ever competitive game three years earlier. Other notable results include beating local rivals Wickwar Wanderers Reserves 4-0 away and drawing 2-2 with them at home. The Stallions finished 5th out of 11 in their first year in Division 7.

=== 2013–14 season ===
The Stallions lifted their only piece of silverware in the 2013–14 season as they convincingly won Division 7, finishing nine points clear of their nearest rivals, Rodborough Old Boys. The Stallions only suffered one defeat all season, a 2-1 away loss to Charfield Reserves when the title had already been secured. Season highlights included two more victories over rivals Wickwar Wanderers Reserves. as well as a 16-0 drubbing of Randwick 3rds. The club achieved promotion to Division 6, but folded before the start of the next season.

== Hawkesbury Upton Literature Festival ==
The Hawkesbury Upton Literature Festival was founded by local author Debbie Young and has been held annually since 2015.
