= 41st (Welch) Regiment of Foot =

British Army line infantry regiment

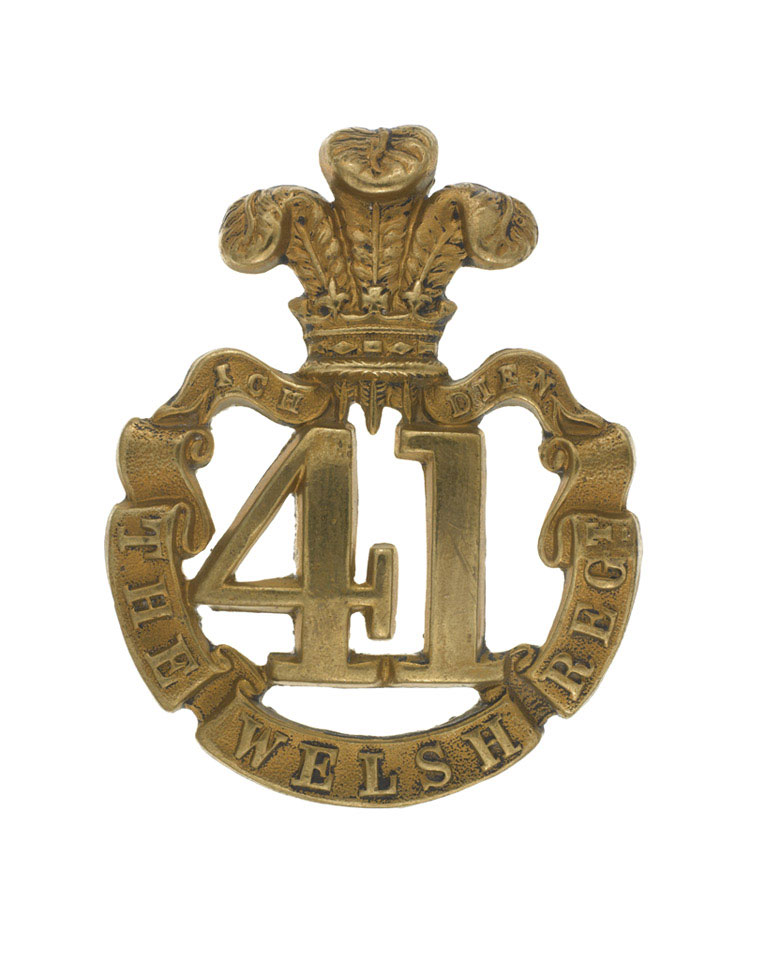
- c. 1874 regimental cap badge for other ranks
- Active: 1719–1881
- Country: Great Britain (1719–1800); United Kingdom (1801–1881)
- Branch: British Army
- Type: Line infantry
- Size: 1 battalion (1719–1813; 1813–1881); 2 battalions (1813)
- Garrison/HQ: Maindy Barracks in Cardiff
- Nickname: The Invalids
- Engagements: War of 1812; First Anglo-Burmese War; First Anglo-Afghan War; Crimean War

The 41st (Welch) Regiment of Foot was a line infantry regiment of the British Army raised in 1719. Under the Childers Reforms it amalgamated with the 69th (South Lincolnshire) Regiment of Foot to form the Welch Regiment in 1881.

== History ==
=== Early history ===
A regimental private in c. 1742

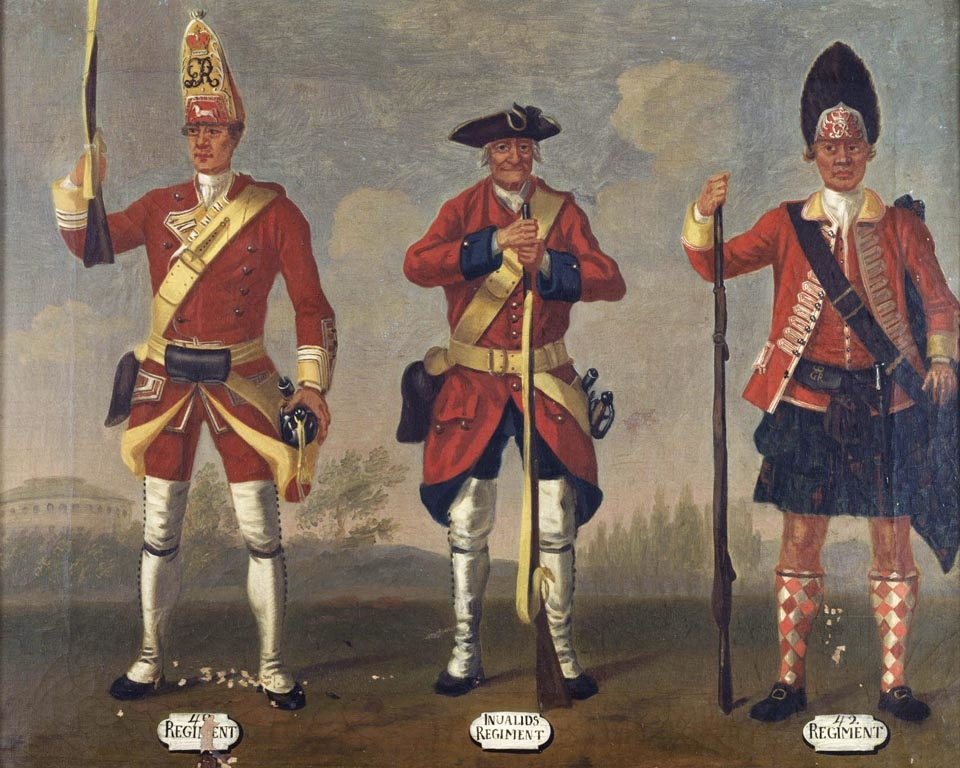
c. 1751 painting of a regimental private (centre)

The regiment was raised by Colonel Edmund Fielding in March 1719 as Edmund Fielding's Regiment of Foot out of independent companies of invalids and Chelsea out-pensioners - soldiers incapable of normal service through disease, age or injury. For much of its early history the regiment undertook garrison duties at Portsmouth. It was renamed the Royal Invalids in 1741, and it was numbered the 41st Regiment of Foot in 1751. In 1782, when other regiments took county titles, it was denoted as the 41st (Royal Invalids) Regiment of Foot; in 1787 it ceased to comprise invalids and became a conventional line regiment, dropping the title. On 23 January 1788, Arthur Wellesley, the future Duke of Wellington, joined the regiment as a young lieutenant.

The Battle of Lundy's Lane, which the regiment fought in

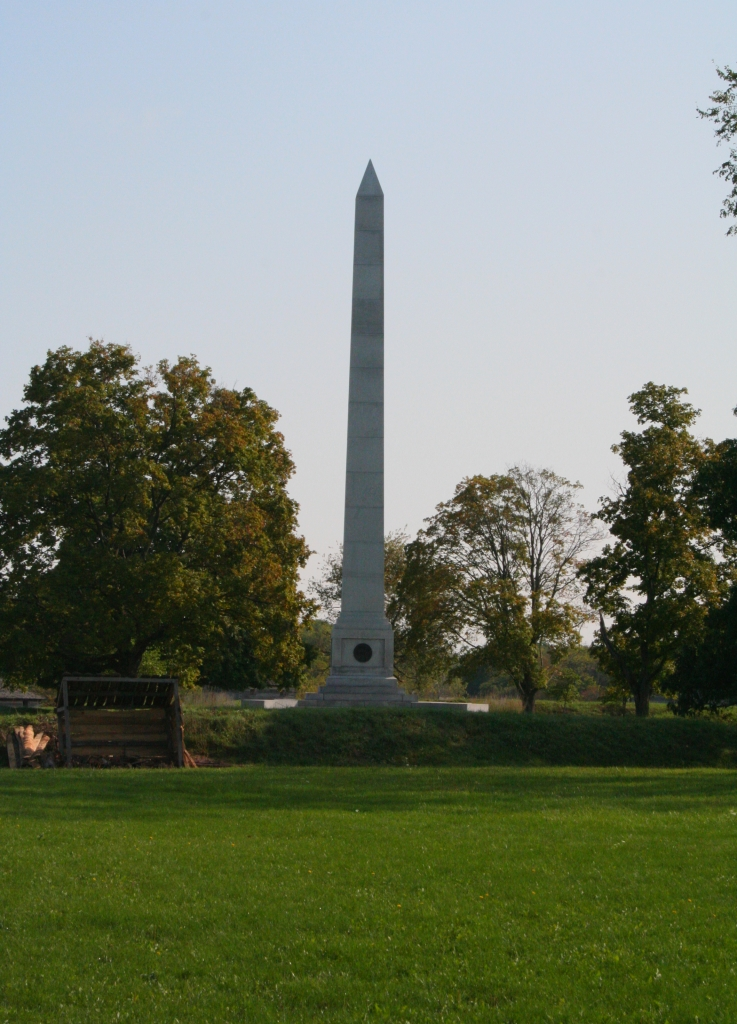
Memorial to the regimental troops who died at the siege of Fort Meigs

The regiment embarked for the West Indies in 1793 for service in the French Revolutionary Wars; it took part in the capture of Martinique in March 1794 and the attack on Guadeloupe in April 1794 before returning to England in October 1796. It was posted to Canada in 1800 and saw service there during the War of 1812. It fought under Major General Isaac Brock at the siege of Detroit in August 1812 and the Battle of Queenston Heights in October 1812. Following Brock's death, it fought under Major-General Henry Procter at the Battle of Frenchtown in January 1813 and formed the bulk of the attacking force at the siege of Fort Meigs in April 1813 and the Battle of Fort Stephenson in August 1813. It then formed part of the crew of the British naval squadron which was defeated at the Battle of Lake Erie in September 1813 and faced defeat again at the Battle of the Thames in October 1813. It also took part in the successful Capture of Fort Niagara and Battle of Buffalo in December 1813, the Battle of Lundy's Lane in July 1814, and the Siege of Fort Erie in August and September 1814.

Shadrack Byfield, a private in the regiment from 1809 to 1815, took part in many of these battles before losing an arm at Conjocta Creek in 1814 and, after returning home, chronicled the battles in his memoirs.

=== The Victorian era ===
The regiment was posted to India in July 1822 and was deployed to Rangoon for service in the First Anglo-Burmese War in May 1824. It formed part of an army which advanced up the River Irrawaddy to the Kingdom of Ava and then captured Bagan in February 1826. It received a territorial affiliation in 1831, becoming the 41st (Welch) Regiment of Foot.

The regiment was sent to Afghanistan in 1842 for service in the First Anglo-Afghan War and saw action at Kandahar and Ghazni. Patrick Cleburne, a private in the regiment from 1846 to 1849, subsequently moved to United States and rose to major general in the Confederate Army during the American Civil War. The regiment landed at Kalamita in summer 1854 for service in the Crimean War and fought at the Battle of Alma in September 1854 and the Battle of Inkerman, where they captured the Russian drums, in November 1854 before taking part in the siege of Sevastopol in winter 1854.

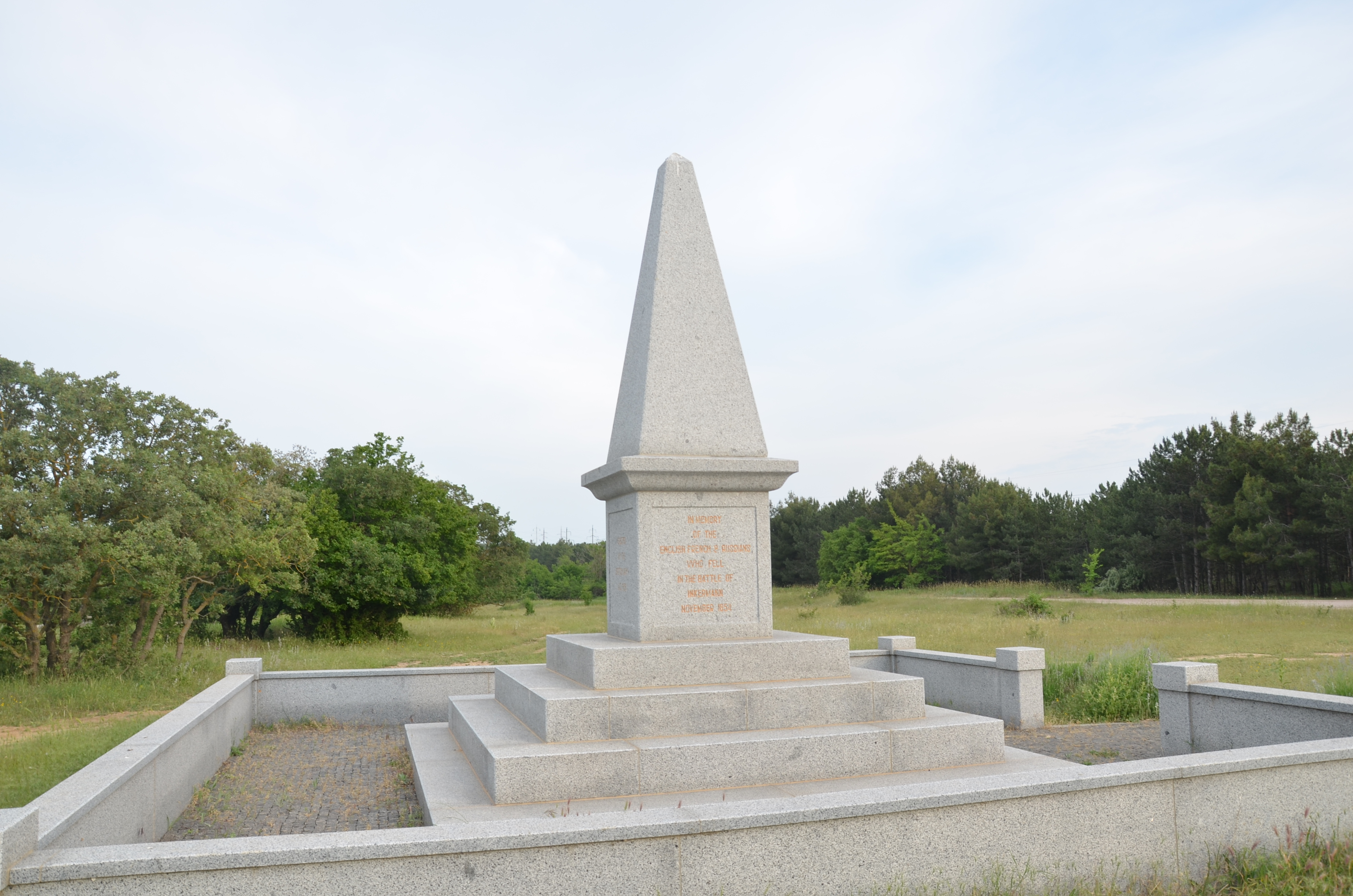
Memorial to the regimental troops who died at the Battle of Inkerman

As part of the Cardwell Reforms of the 1870s, where single-battalion regiments were linked together to share a single depot and recruiting district in the United Kingdom, the 41st was linked with the 69th (South Lincolnshire) Regiment of Foot, and assigned to district no. 24 at Maindy Barracks in Cardiff. On 1 July 1881 the Childers Reforms came into effect and the regiment amalgamated with the 69th (South Lincolnshire) Regiment of Foot to form the Welch Regiment.

== Battle honours ==
The regiment's battle honours were as follows:

- War of 1812: Detroit, Queenstown, Miami, Niagara
- First Anglo-Burmese War: Ava
- First Anglo-Afghan War: Kandahar (1842), Ghazni (1842)
- Crimean War: Alma, Inkerman, siege of Sevastopol

== Victoria Crosses ==
Two Victoria Crosses were awarded to men of the regiment

- Sergeant-Major Ambrose Madden, Crimean War (26 October 1854)
- Captain Hugh Rowlands, Crimean War (5 November 1854)

== Colonels of the Regiment ==
Colonels of the regiment were:

=== The Regiment of Invalids ===
- 1719–1743: Lt-Gen. Edmund Fielding
- 1743–1752: Col. Tomkyn Wardour

=== The 41st Regiment of Foot (Invalids) ===
- 1752–1764: Lt-Gen. John Parsons
- 1764–1765: Maj-Gen. Alexander Leslie, 6th Lord Lindores
- 1765–1771: Maj-Gen. John Parker
- 1771–1784: Lt-Gen. Jordan Wren
- 1784–1790: Maj-Gen. Archibald McNab

=== The 41st Regiment of Foot ===
- 1790–1808: Gen. Sir Thomas Stirling, 5th Baronet
- 1808–1809: Lt-Gen. Hay McDowall
- 1810–1819: Gen. Sir Josiah Champagné, GCH
- 1819–1837: Lt-Gen. Hon. Sir Edward Stopford, GCB

=== The 41st (Welsh) Regiment of Foot ===
- 1837–1848: Gen. Sir Ralph Darling, GCH
- 1848–1861: Gen. Charles Ashe à Court-Repington, CB, KH
- 1861–1881: Gen. Sir Richard England, GCB, KH

== Sources ==
- Lomax, David Alexander Napier (1899). A history of the services of the 41st (the Welch) regiment (now 1st battalion the Welch regiment) from its formation in 1719 to 1895. Hiorns & Miller.

Preceded by Royal Invalids	41st (Welch) Regiment of Foot; 1719–1881	Succeeded by The Welch Regiment
