= General Feilding =

General Feilding may refer to:

- Geoffrey Feilding (1866–1932), British Army major general
- Percy Feilding (1827–1904), British Army general
- William Feilding (British Army officer, born 1836) (1836–1895), British Army general
- William Feilding, Viscount Feilding (1760–1799), British Army major general

== See also ==
- Edmund Fielding (1676–1741), British Army lieutenant general
