= Tresham, Gloucestershire =

Village in Gloucestershire, England

Coordinates: 51.61923°N 2.30183°W

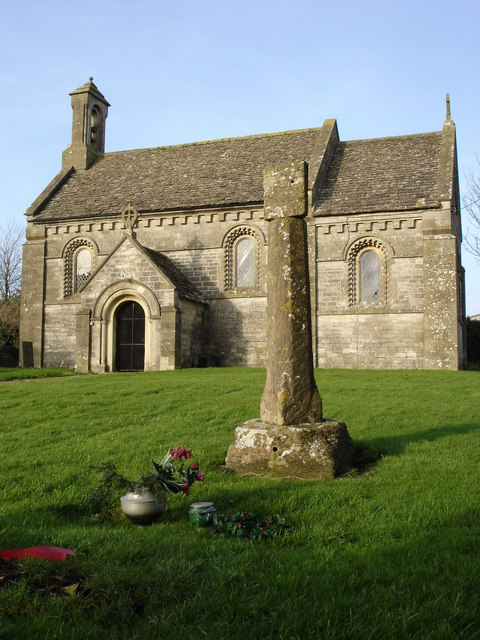
- Tresham Church

- Location within Gloucestershire
- Civil parish: Hillesley and Tresham
- District: Stroud
- Shire county: Gloucestershire
- Region: South West
- Country: England
- Sovereign state: United Kingdom
- Post town: Wotton-under-Edge
- Postcode district: GL12
- Police: Gloucestershire
- Fire: Gloucestershire
- Ambulance: South Western
- UK Parliament: South Cotswolds

Tresham is a village in the civil parish of Hillesley and Tresham, in the Stroud district, in the county of Gloucestershire, England. It was transferred back from the county of Avon in 1991, having been in Gloucestershire before 1974. It is on the Monarch's Way and near the Cotswold Way (grid reference ST792912).

According to Pevsner Tresham Church, built in a Norman style on the site of a previous church building, dates from 1855.

Burden Court Farm was originally the home of Charles II's Lord Chief Justice Sir Matthew Hale (1609–76). It was later the home of Lord (Jack) and Lady (Frances) Donaldson.
