= A433 road =

Road in Gloucestershire

A433

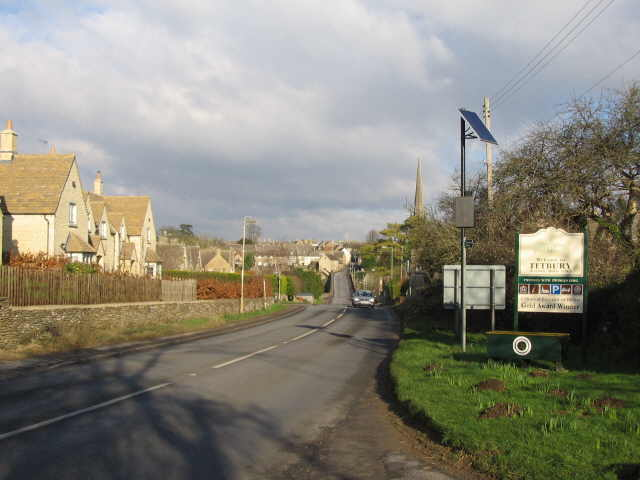
- A433 Bath Road entering Tetbury from the southwest entrance

Route information
- Length: 16.5 mi (26.6 km)

Major junctions
- From: Dunkirk
- A46 A4135 A429
- To: Cirencester

Location
- Country: United Kingdom
- Primary destinations: Tetbury; Westonbirt Arboretum; Kemble; Cirencester

Road network
- Roads in the United Kingdom; Motorways; A and B road zones

The A433 road is an A road and primary route in Gloucestershire, England.

== Route ==
It starts at a junction with the A46 at Dunkirk (51.5754°N 2.3017°W), 5 miles (8.0 km) north of junction 18 of the M4 and 4 miles (6.4 km) northeast of Chipping Sodbury. It runs northeast for 16.5 miles (26.6 km) to a junction with the A429 just west of Cirencester (51.7011°N 2.0006°W). On its way to Cirencester the road passes Westonbirt Arboretum, and runs through the villages of Westonbirt and Doughton, and the town of Tetbury; then to the north of both Cotswold Airport (formerly RAF Kemble) and Kemble village.

== Fosse Way ==
The last 2 miles (3.2 km) follow the route of the Fosse Way. In this section the road passes the Thames Head pub (named for the source of the Thames) before rising over a crest and descending into a steep-side cutting to pass under the Golden Valley Line, through a narrow bridge which has no pavement for pedestrians.

== History ==
When the route was first designated in 1922, it finished at a junction with the A429 on the Fosse Way just west of Kemble near Jackaments Bottom. When RAF Kemble was built, circa 1937, the A429 was diverted south of the airfield to follow an upgraded existing road through Kemble village, and the section of the A429 north of the airfield became a continuation of the A433.

In the 1930s or 1940s the route was extended from Cirencester to the A40 just west of Burford, on the former route of the B4425. In the 1980s this section was downgraded to become the B4425 again.
