= Hillesley and Tresham =

Civil parish in Gloucestershire, England

Coordinates: 51°36′45″N 2°19′10″W

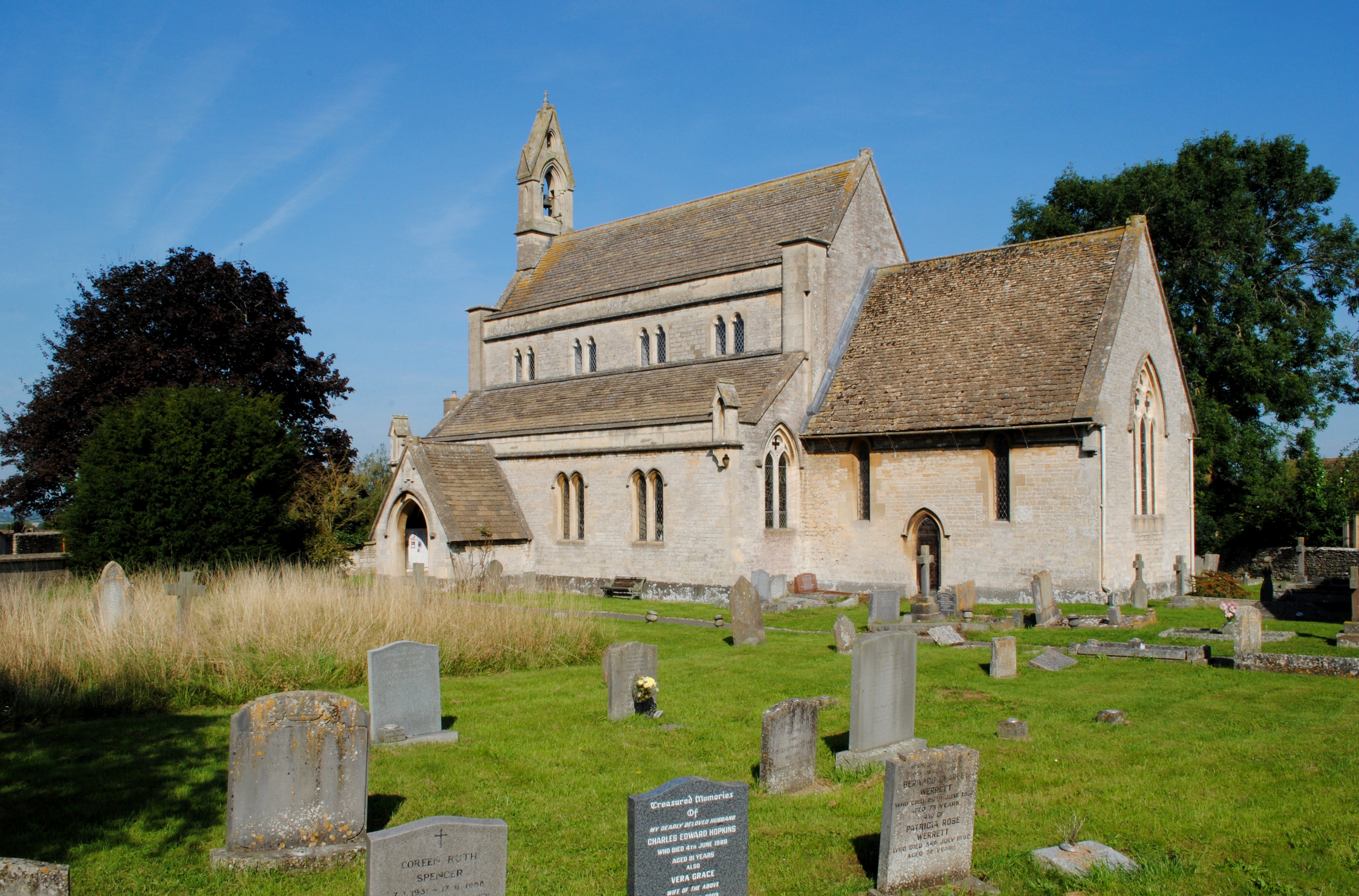
- St Giles Church, Hillesley

- Location within Gloucestershire
- Population: 391 (2011 census)
- District: Stroud
- Shire county: Gloucestershire
- Region: South West
- Country: England
- Sovereign state: United Kingdom
- Police: Gloucestershire
- Fire: Gloucestershire
- Ambulance: South Western

Hillesley and Tresham is a civil parish in the Stroud District of Gloucestershire, England. It had a population of 591 according to the 2001 census, decreasing to 391 at the 2011 census. The parish contains the villages of Hillesley and Tresham. The Lyvett (Levett) family, an Anglo-Norman family prominent in Sussex, were lords of the manor of Hillesley in 12th and 13th centuries. The family also held Boxwell, Chipping Sodbury and other places in Gloucestershire.

The parish was formed in 1991 from part of the Hawkesbury parish in the Northavon district of Avon, which was transferred to Stroud District in Gloucestershire at the time. Between 1935 and 1971, as part of Hawkesbury parish, Hillesley and Tresham formed part of Sodbury Rural District in Gloucestershire.
