= Hillesley =

Village in Gloucestershire, England

Coordinates: 51.605°N 2.335°W

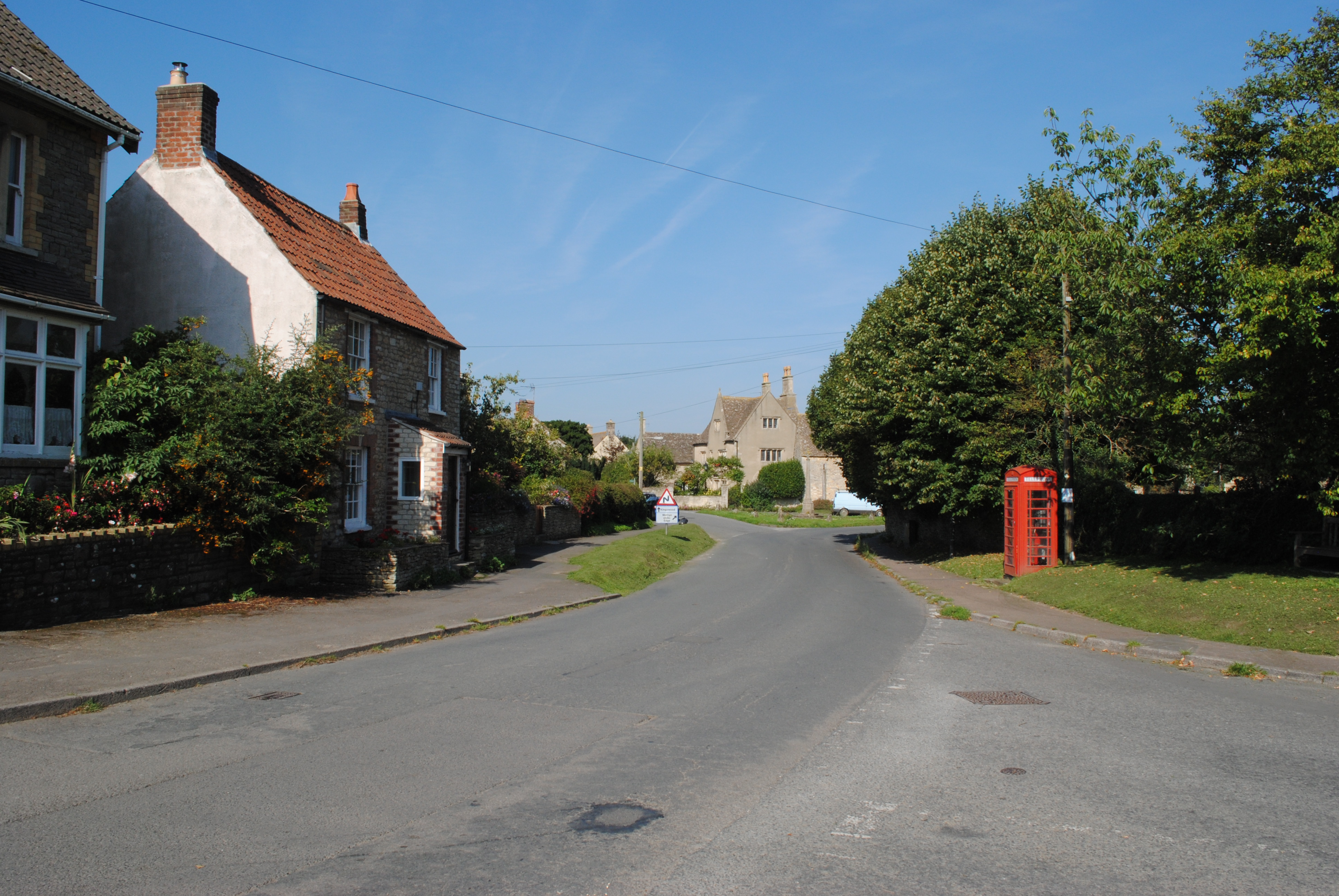

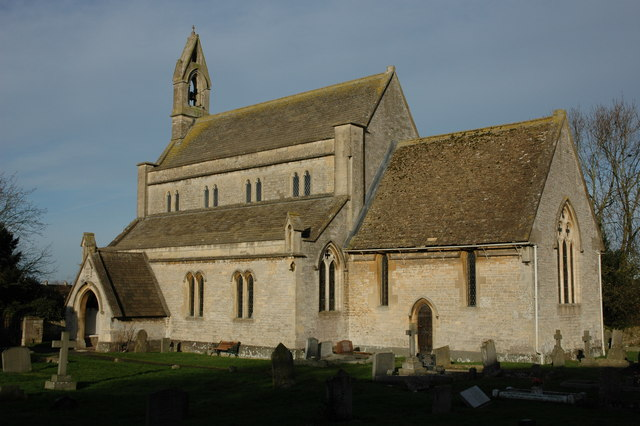

- Location within Gloucestershire
- Civil parish: Hillesley and Tresham
- District: Stroud
- Shire county: Gloucestershire
- Region: South West
- Country: England
- Sovereign state: United Kingdom
- Post town: Wotton-under-Edge
- Postcode district: GL12
- Police: Gloucestershire
- Fire: Gloucestershire
- Ambulance: South Western
- UK Parliament: South Cotswolds

Hillesley is a village in Gloucestershire, England. It was transferred from the county of Avon in 1991 and is now in Stroud District. The village forms part of the civil parish of Hillesley and Tresham. It is close to the Cotswold Edge, near the Cotswold Way and about 2 1/2 miles (4.0 km) south of the town of Wotton under Edge (grid reference ST769896).

Until the 1980s the name of the village was spelt Hillsley.

== History ==
In 972, Hillesley was recorded as Hildeslei (meaning "clearing belonging to Hild"), a tything of the parish of Hawkesbury. The village remained in the parish of Hawkesbury until the boundary changes of 1991. In the Domesday Book of 1086 it is recorded as held by Turstin FitzRolf.

== Local amenities ==
Pevsner notes the following buildings: The local church is St Giles – it was designed in 1851 by the amateur, Rev. Perkins. The farmhouse is from the 17th century, and Yew Tree Cottage is dated 1701. The greyish-white limestone farmhouse known as "Lovettswood," a prominent landmark, takes its name from the Lyvet family, who were lords of the manor of Hillesley in the 12th and 13th centuries.

The local pub is the Fleece Inn. In July 2012, The Fleece Inn, after a short period of closure, was re-opened by the community. It was bought and re-furbished by The Hillesley Community Pub Limited which has over 120 local shareholders.

Village amenities include a primary school, the church, a playing field hosting cricket, a tennis court and club, allotments and a mother and toddler group. Until recent years, the village field hosted a successful football team, competing in local leagues.

== In popular culture ==
In 1971 journalist John Craven made a TV programme report about Hillesley; he revisited the village in 2023 for the TV programme Countryfile to see how life in the village had changed over 52 years.

== Notable residents ==
- William Nicholson, Oscar-nominated screenwriter, whose family farmed in the village.
