= Hawkesbury, Gloucestershire =

Village and civil parish in South Gloucestershire, England

Coordinates: 51.58859°N 2.33049°W

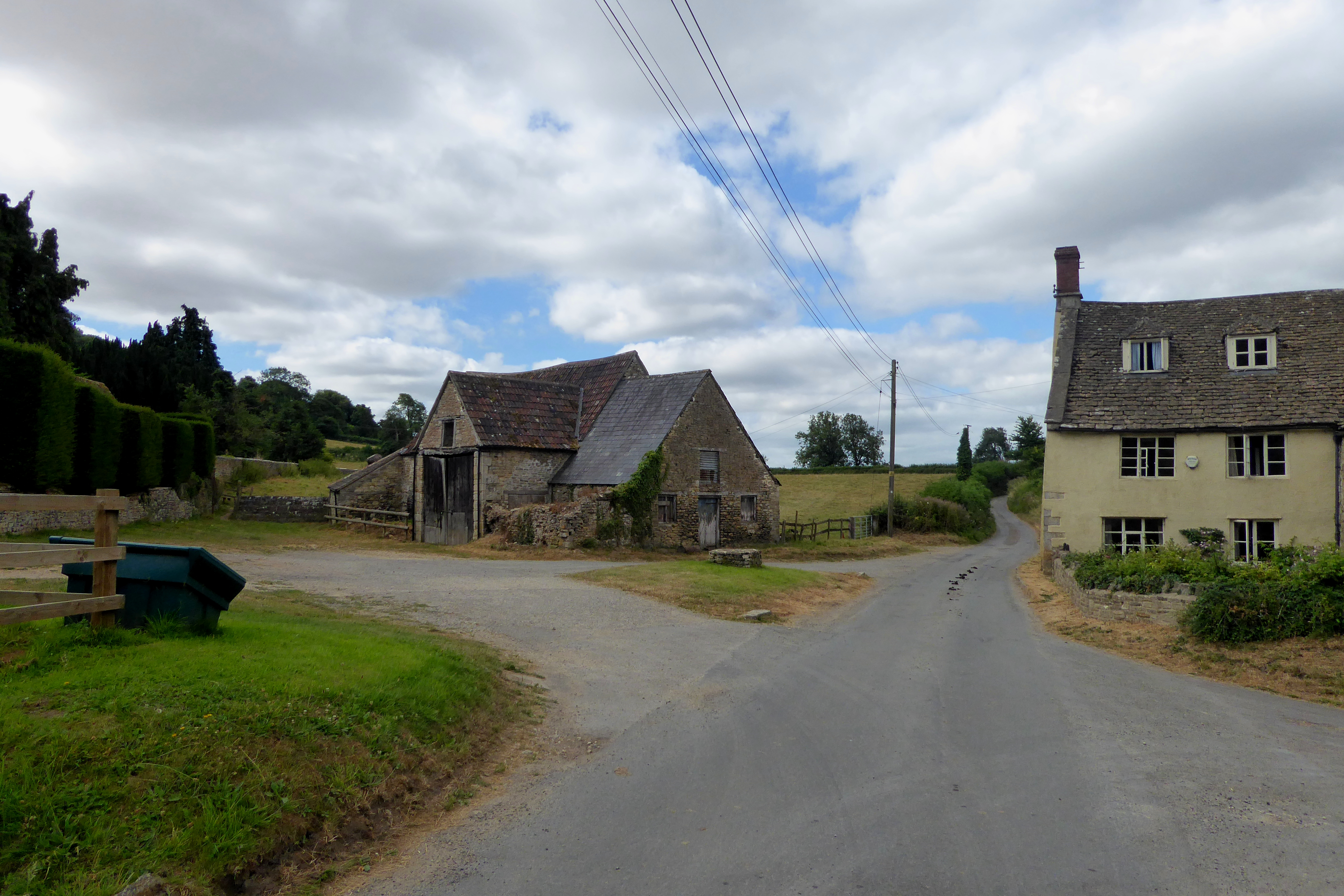
The centre of the hamlet

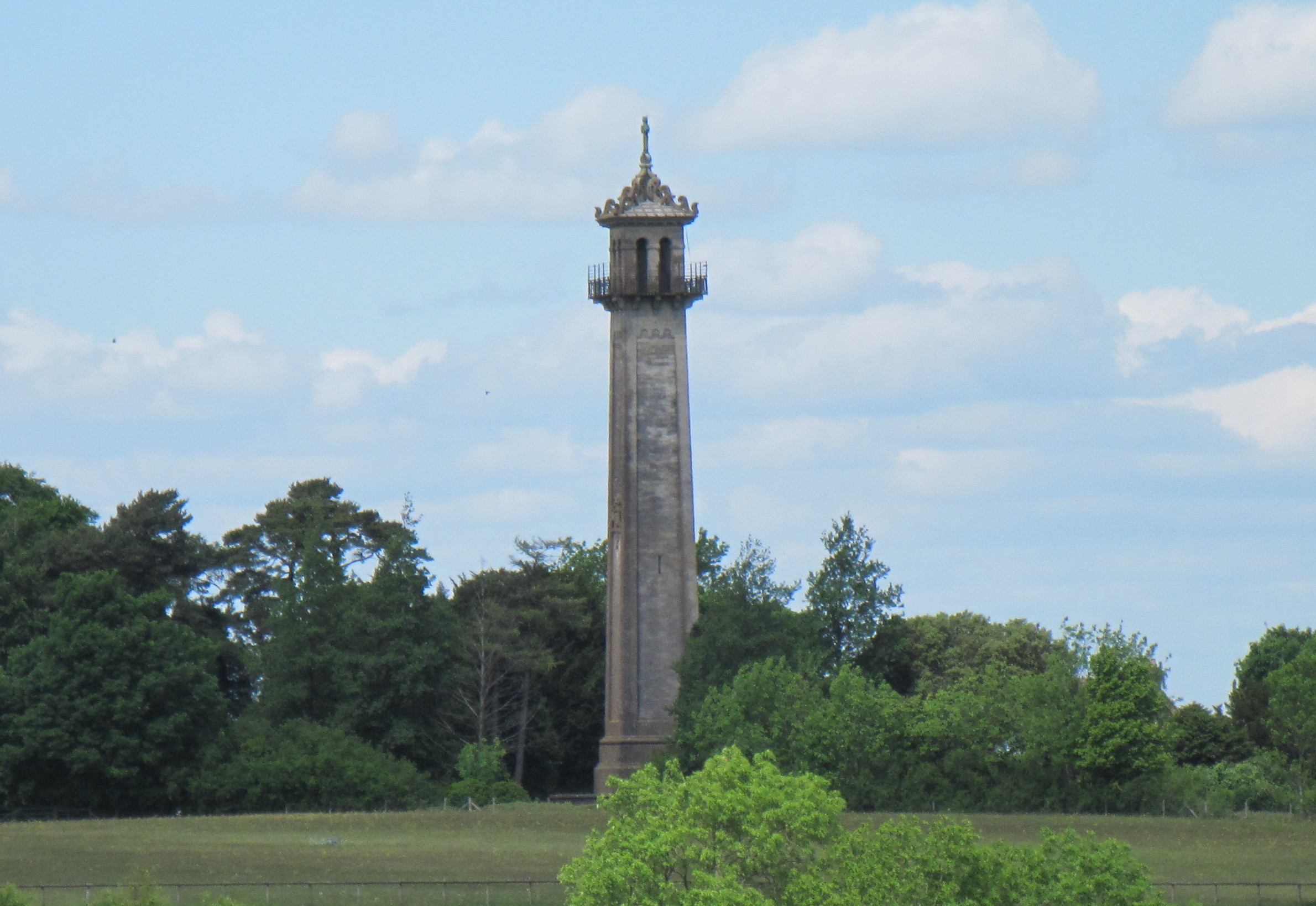
The Somerset Monument, near Hawkesbury Upton

Hawkesbury is a hamlet and civil parish in South Gloucestershire, England. The hamlet, consisting of a few cottages around a triangular green, lies west of Hawkesbury Upton, off the A46 road.

The civil parish includes Hawkesbury itself, the larger village of Hawkesbury Upton and the hamlets of Dunkirk, Petty France and Little Badminton. At the 2001 census the parish had a population of 1,235, increasing to 1,263 at the 2011 census. Prior to 1991, what is now the Hillesley and Tresham parish in Stroud District formed the northern part of the parish.

The parish is in Cotswold Edge electoral ward, which stretches south to Tormarton.

The Cotswold Way passes the two settlements and north of Hawkesbury, just east of the Cotswold Way, is a slim tower, the Somerset Monument (picture on the right).

== History ==
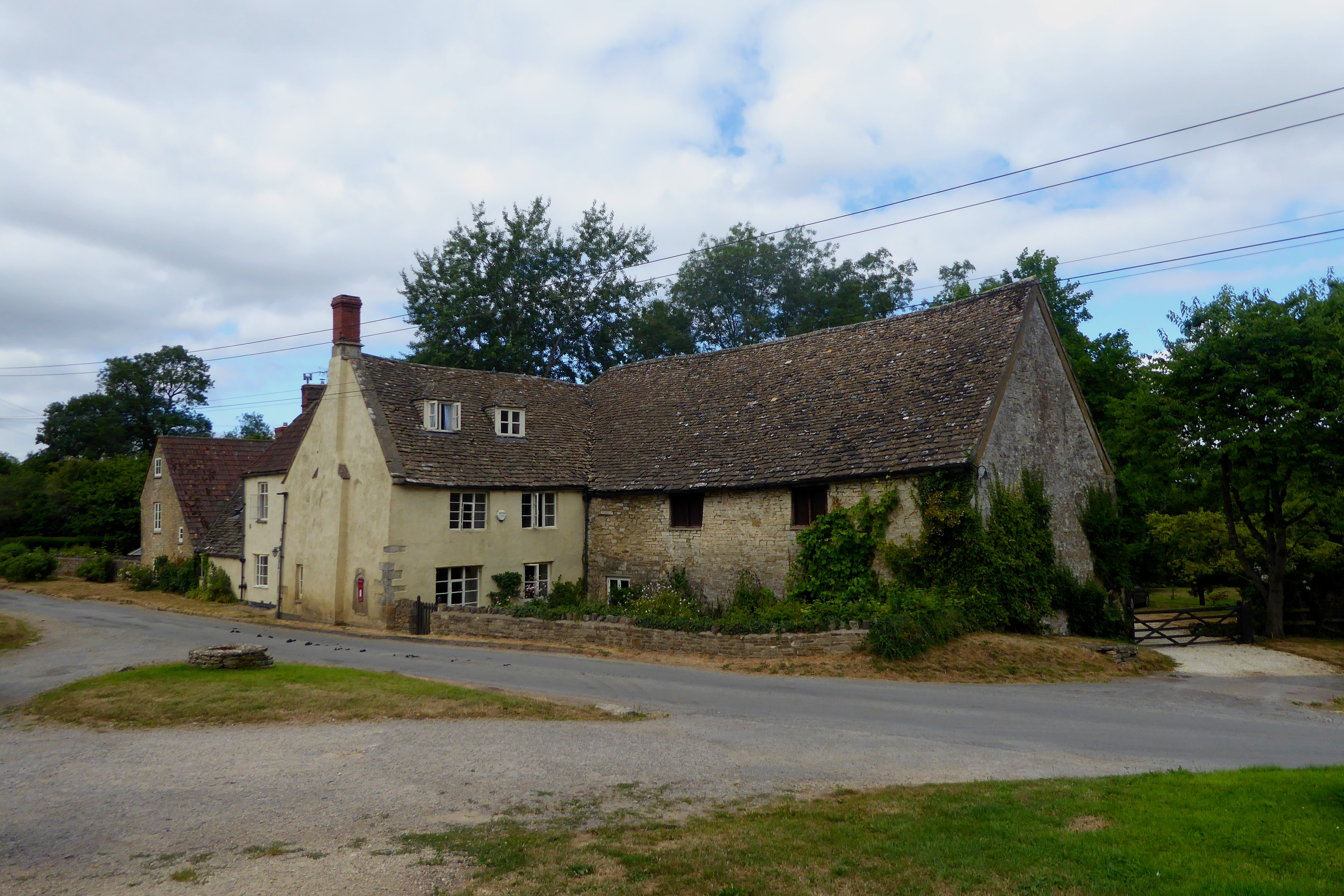
A house in the centre of Hawkesbury

John Marius Wilson described 19th-century Hawkesbury in his Imperial Gazetteer of England and Wales as a "tything, a parish, and a sub-district, in Chipping-Sodbury district, Gloucester…has a post office, of the name of Hawkesbury-Upton, under Chippenham, a police station, and a fair on the last Friday of Aug." The population of Hawkesbury at that time was 466 and the town had 108 houses. Together with the tithings of Upton, Hillesley, Little Badminton, and Saddlewood-with-Tresham and Killcott, the parish of Hawkesbury had a population of 2,173 in 499 houses.

Hawkesbury was a rural parish in Gloucestershire, in which agriculture and animal husbandry were economically dominant. The climate in southwestern Gloucestershire was partial to raising potatoes, along with domesticated animals. Cattle and sheep were important to the livelihood of the residents of Hawkesbury, and a fair was held on the last Friday of August for the sale of those animals. The raising of sheep was a principal source of income, primarily for their wool. Homes constructed along streams aided in the wool production industry as it provided water necessary for dying and washing. This water also provided means to grind corn in grist mills and finish cloth in fulling mills.

== Religious sites ==
The Church of St Mary was built in the 12th century. It is a Grade I listed building.

== Monument ==
There is a monument (the 'Somerset Monument') on the Cotswold Edge at grid reference ST772878. The monument was erected in 1846 to commemorate General Lord Edward Somerset, a soldier son of the 5th Duke of Beaufort (whose ancestral home is at Badminton), who had served with distinction at Waterloo. The first keeper of the monument was Shadrack Byfield, a one-armed veteran of the Anglo-American War of 1812, whose memoirs of that conflict have achieved a measure of fame.
