= Ambrose Madden =

Irish Victoria Cross recipient

- Born: 1820; Cork, Ireland
- Died: 1 January 1863 (aged 42); Jamaica
- Burial place: Up Park Military Camp Cemetery
- Military career
- Allegiance: United Kingdom
- Branch: British Army
- Rank: Lieutenant
- Units: 41st Regiment of Foot; 2nd West India Regiment
- Conflicts: Crimean War
- Awards: Victoria Cross; Médaille militaire

Ambrose Madden VC (Irish: Anmchadh Ó Madaidhín; 1820 – 1 January 1863) was an officer in the British Army. Born in Cork he was an Irish recipient of the Victoria Cross, the highest and most prestigious award for gallantry in the face of the enemy that can be awarded to British and Commonwealth forces.

== Details ==
He was about 34 years old, and a sergeant-major in the 41st Regiment of Foot, British Army during the Crimean War when the following deed took place for which he was awarded the VC.

On 26 October 1854, in the Crimea, at Little Inkerman, Sergeant Madden headed a party of men of the 41st Regiment which cut off and took prisoner one Russian officer and 14 privates, three of whom were personally captured by the sergeant.

== Further information ==
Madden was commissioned into the 2nd West India Regiment in 1858 and promoted to lieutenant in 1861. He died in Jamaica on 1 January 1863.

== See also ==
- Síol Anmchadha
