= Dunkirk, Gloucestershire =

Coordinates: 51.577°N 2.302°W

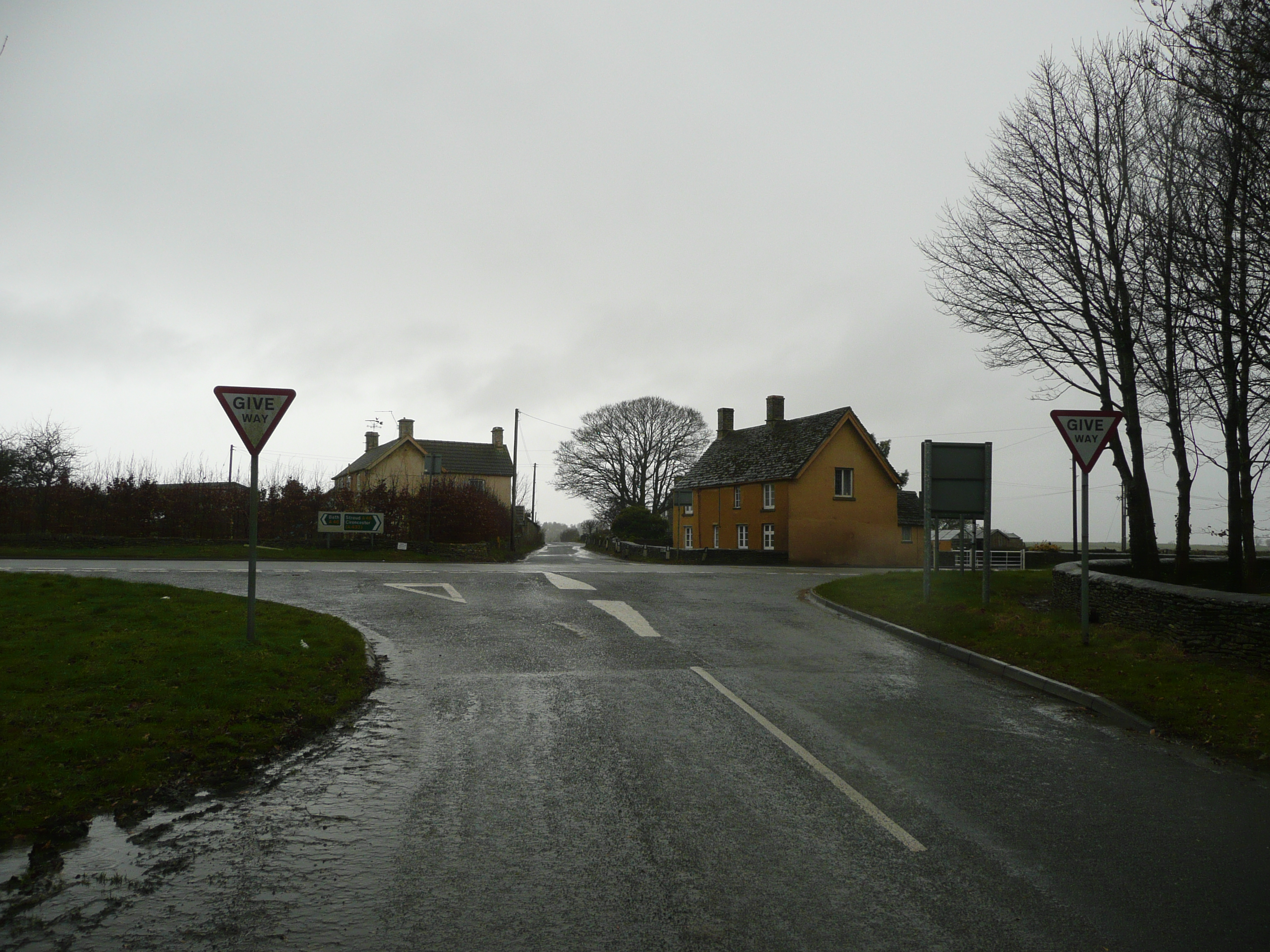
Hamlet of Dunkirk, Gloucestershire

Dunkirk is a hamlet in the rural north of South Gloucestershire, near the Gloucestershire border, in the parish of Hawkesbury. The hamlet is on an important T-junction where the A46 (which goes from Bath to Nailsworth and Stroud) meets the A433 (which goes towards Tetbury and Cirencester).

Dunkirk in Hawkesbury parish should not be confused with Dunkirk near Nailsworth, also on the A46 in Gloucestershire, and the site of Dunkirk Mill.

== Road accidents ==
In 2002, Dunkirk and the hamlet of Petty France, directly to the south, were known as road accident hotspots. According to the council's accident database, the proportion of fatal and serious accidents was 46%, significantly higher than the average for South Gloucestershire as a whole, which was 12%. 13 accidents occurred between 1 January 1998 and 31 December 2001, of which two were fatal, four others were classified as serious, and seven were slight. As a result of this, the speed through the two hamlets was reduced to 40 MPH.
