= Shadrack Byfield =

British soldier (1789–1874)

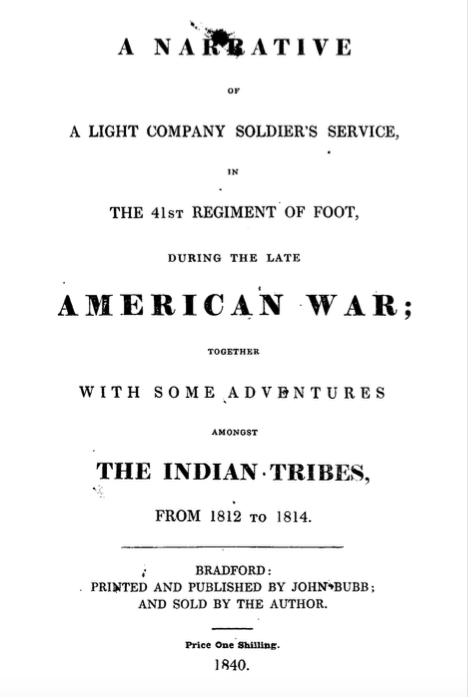
- Title page of Byfield's A Narrative of a Light Company Soldier's Service (1840)
- Born: 16 September 1789; Woolley, Wiltshire
- Died: 17 January 1874 (aged 84); Bradford on Avon, Wiltshire
- Military career
- Allegiance: United Kingdom
- Branch: British Militia; British Army
- Service years: 1807–1815
- Rank: Private
- Units: Wiltshire Militia; 41st (Welch) Regiment of Foot
- Conflicts: War of 1812; Siege of Detroit; Battle of Frenchtown (WIA); Siege of Fort Meigs; Battle of the Thames; Capture of Fort Niagara; Battle of Lundy's Lane; Battle of Conjocta Creek (WIA)
- Awards: Military General Service Medal

Shadrack Byfield (16 September 1789 – 17 January 1874) was a British soldier who served in the War of 1812. He is best known as the author of a memoir of his wartime experiences, A Narrative of a Light Company Soldier's Service, published in his hometown of Bradford-on-Avon in 1840. This work is notable as one of the few accounts of the conflict penned by a enlisted British soldier.

== Early life and military service ==
Shadrack Byfield was born on 16 September 1789 in Woolley, a suburb of Bradford-on-Avon in Wiltshire, to a family of weavers. He enlisted in the Wiltshire Militia in 1807 at the rank of private. Two years later, he volunteered to join the British Army's 41st (Welch) Regiment of Foot at the same rank and was sent to join the regiment in British North America, serving in Lower Canada and at Fort George in modern-day Niagara-on-the-Lake prior to the outbreak of war.

Serving in a regimental light company, Byfield saw action during the War of 1812 between the United Kingdom and the United States. In the conflict's western theatre, he served at the Siege of Detroit and the Battle of Frenchtown, where he was wounded in the shoulder, as well as at the Siege of Fort Meigs and the Battle of Fort Stephenson. Byfield narrowly escaped capture after the British defeat at the Battle of the Thames and later rejoined elements of his regiment in the Niagara Peninsula. Byfield participated in the Capture of Fort Niagara and the Battle of Lundy's Lane, but his left arm was shattered by a musket ball at the Battle of Conjocta Creek, an unsuccessful British raid on 3 August 1814 preceding the Siege of Fort Erie. Byfield's forearm was subsequently amputated and he was invalided back to England, where he was awarded a pension from the Royal Hospital Chelsea in 1815.

== Later life ==
Byfield returned to Bradford on Avon and married but was prevented from working at his trade because he required use of both hands to operate a loom. However, according to his memoirs, a design for an "instrument" came to him one night in a dream. This contraption enabled him to work at a loom with just one arm, allowing him to provide for his family. Byfield also campaigned for a higher military pension, eventually succeeding with the aid of William Napier and Lord FitzRoy Somerset.

Byfield published a narrative of his wartime experiences in 1840 and completed another autobiography, entitled History and Conversion of a British Soldier, in 1851. The second memoir details Byfield's post-military life, including his spiritual experiences and struggles with poverty; only one copy is known to exist. No copies of a third and final memoir written by Byfield, The Forlorn Hope, appear to have survived.

Byfield served as the first keeper of the Lord Edward Somerset Monument at Hawkesbury Upton in Gloucestershire, which was completed in 1845. However, the veteran was dismissed from the post in 1853 after becoming embroiled in a bitter feud for control of a local Baptist chapel.

Although some sources claim that Byfield died c. 1850, more recent research has revealed that Byfield died on 17 January 1874 in Bradford on Avon, aged 84.

== Significance ==
Shadrack Byfield's Narrative provides a rare common soldier's perspective of the War of 1812, and as such his account is considered to be an important source for studying the conflict. Byfield has often been portrayed as the archetypical 1812-era British soldier by modern historians. John Gellner, who edited Byfield's memoir in 1963, asserted that his story "could have been told by any one of those humble, patient, iron-hard British regulars who more than made up in discipline, training and bravery for their lack of numbers."

Byfield's 1840 account is frequently referenced in secondary histories of the war, including in Pierre Berton's popular histories The Invasion of Canada and Flames Across the Border. The veteran's story has also been featured in museum exhibits (for example, at Old Fort Erie) and in documentaries on the War of 1812, including Canada: A People's History (2000) and PBS's The War of 1812 (2011).

Byfield was the protagonist in a 1985 children's novel, Redcoat, by Canadian author Gregory Sass, which presents a heavily fictionalised account of his military experiences.
