= Edmund Fielding =

British Army officer (1676–1741)

Lieutenant-General Edmund Fielding
- Born: 20 January 1676; Puddletown, Dorset
- Died: 20 June 1741 (aged 65)
- Relatives: Henry Fielding (son); Sarah Fielding (daughter)
- Military career
- Allegiance: Kingdom of England (until 1707); Kingdom of Great Britain (1707–1741)
- Branch: English Army; British Army
- Service years: 1696–1741
- Rank: Lieutenant-General
- Commands: 41st (Welch) Regiment of Foot
- Conflicts: War of the Spanish Succession; Battle of Blenheim

Lieutenant-General Edmund Fielding (29 January 1676 – 20 June 1741) was a British Army officer.

== Military career ==
Edmund Fielding was born 29 January 1676 in Puddletown, Dorset, the son of John Fielding, canon of Salisbury. Fielding joined the English Army as an ensign in the 1st Foot Guards on 15 December 1696. He was promoted to captain some time before 1704, serving in Webb's Regiment of Foot. Fighting under Lord Marlborough in the War of the Spanish Succession, Fielding was present at the Battle of Blenheim on 13 August 1704.

He was promoted to major on 12 April 1706, serving in Lord Tunbridge's Regiment of Foot. Around 1709 he succeeded Colonel Brazier in command of his own regiment of foot. In 1713, he was placed on half pay. On 11 March 1719, he raised what came to be known as the 41st Regiment of Foot from independent companies of invalids.

Fielding was promoted to brigadier in 1727, major-general in 1735 and to lieutenant-general in 1739.

== Personal life ==
He married Sarah Gould. They had two sons, Henry Fielding, who became an English novelist and dramatist, and Sir John Fielding, a magistrate, and four daughters, including the writer Sarah Fielding. Fielding died in 1741 in England.

== Sources ==
- Dalton, Charles (2006) [1899]. The Blenheim Roll. Uckfield, East Sussex: The Naval & Military Press. ISBN 978-1-84574-369-7.
- Nichols, John (1812). Literary anecdotes of the eighteenth century: comprising biographical memoirs of William Bowyer, Printer, FSA, and many of his learned friends. Nichols, Son and Bentley.
