= Lord Edward Somerset =

British Army general

Coordinates: 51.58859°N 2.33049°W

General Lord Edward Somerset GCB
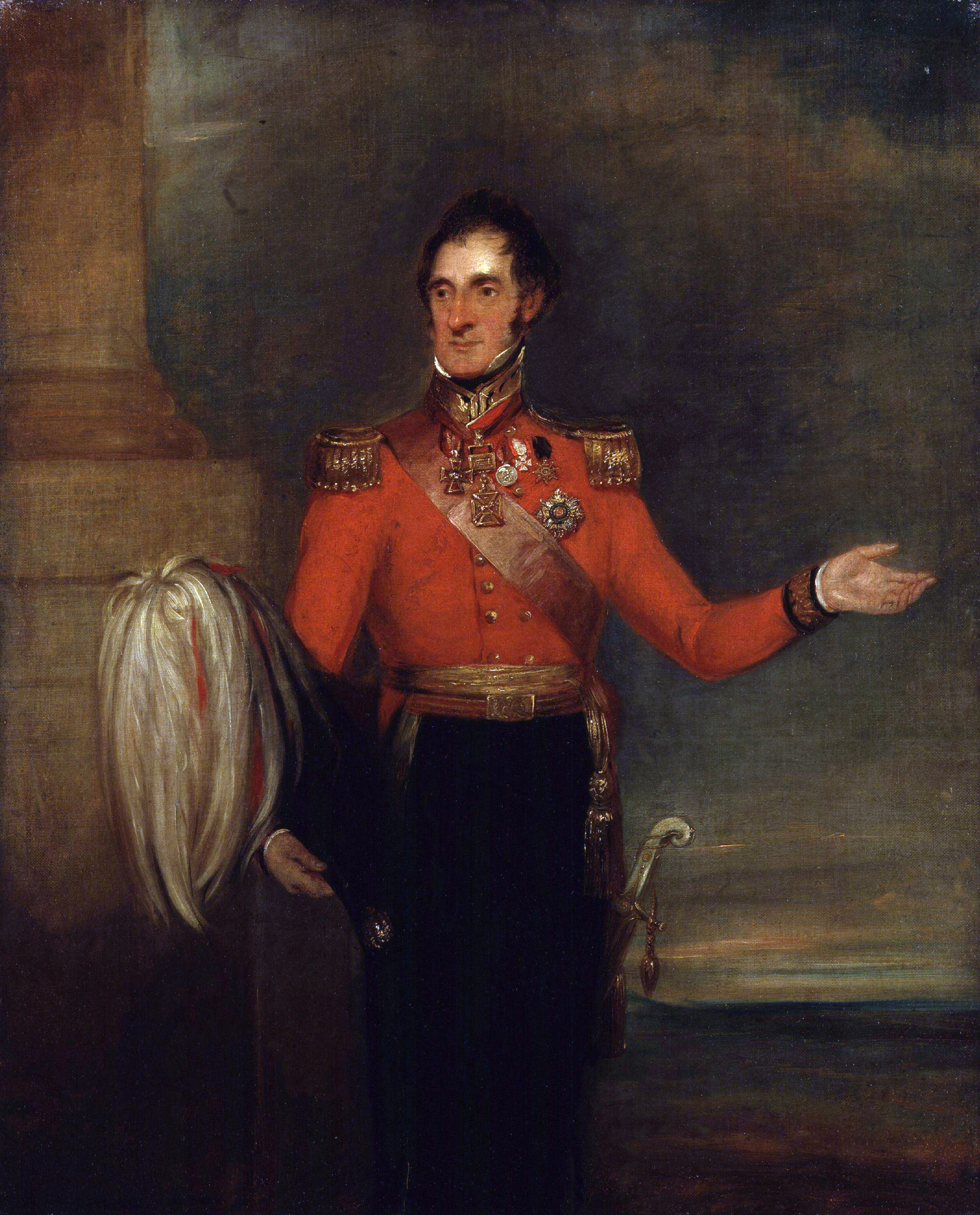

Member of Parliament for Monmouth, Gloucestershire and Cirencester
- In office 1801–1831

Personal details
- Born: 19 December 1776 Badminton House, Gloucestershire
- Died: 1 September 1842 (aged 65) London, England
- Spouse: Lady Louisa Augusta Courtenay
- Children: 8, including Edward
- Parent(s): Henry Somerset, 5th Duke of Beaufort; Elizabeth Boscawen
- Occupation: Soldier

General Lord Robert Edward Henry Somerset GCB (19 December 1776 – 1 September 1842) was a British Army commander who fought during the Peninsular War and the War of the Seventh Coalition. He sat in Parliament from 1801–1831.

== Life ==
Somerset was the third son of Henry Somerset, 5th Duke of Beaufort, and elder brother of Lord Raglan.

Joining the 15th Light Dragoons in 1793, he became captain in the following year, and received a majority after serving as aide-de-camp to Prince Frederick, Duke of York in the Dutch expedition of 1799. At the end of 1800 he became a lieutenant-colonel, and in 1801 received the command of the 4th Dragoons. From 1799 to 1802 he represented the Borough of Monmouth in the House of Commons, from 1803 to 1823 and from 1830 sat for Gloucestershire and from 1834 to 1837 was MP for Cirencester.

He commanded his regiment at the battles of Talavera and Buçaco, and in 1810 received a colonelcy and the appointment of aide-de-camp to the king. In 1811, along with the 3rd Dragoon Guards, the 4th Dragoons fought a notable cavalry action at Usagre, and in 1812 Lord Edward Somerset was engaged in the great charge of Le Marchant's heavy cavalry at Salamanca. His conduct on this occasion (he captured five guns at the head of a single squadron) won him further promotion, and he made the remaining campaigns as a major-general at the head of the Hussar brigade (7th, 10th and 15th Hussars).

At Orthes he won further distinction by his pursuit of the enemy; he was made KCB, and received the thanks of parliament. At Waterloo he was in command of the Household Cavalry Brigade, which distinguished itself not less by its stern and patient endurance of the enemy's fire than by its celebrated charge on the cuirassiers of Milhaud's corps.

The brigadier was particularly mentioned in Wellington's despatches, and received the thanks of parliament as well as the Army Gold Cross with one clasp for his services at Talavera, Salamanca, Vitoria, Orthez, and Toulouse. He also received the Military Order of Maria Theresa and was made an honorary Knight Commander of the Royal Portuguese Military Order of the Tower and Sword.

At Waterloo in 1815 he lost his hat during the first cavalry charge and in the subsequent search for it a cannonball tore off the flap of his coat and killed his horse. He was awarded a GCB in 1834.

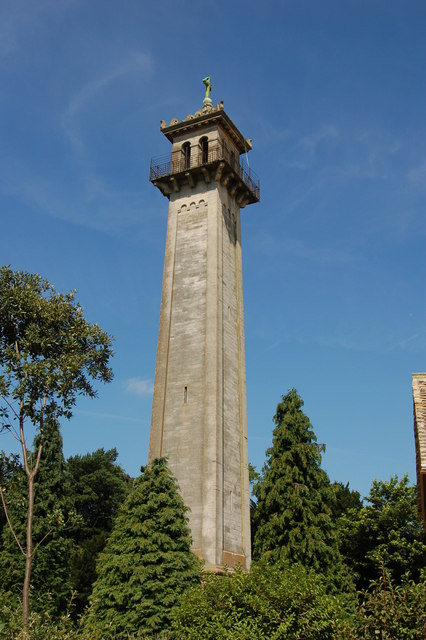
Somerset Monument, Hawkesbury

After a short illness he died in London on 1 September 1842 and was interred in the church of St. George's, Hanover Square. A memorial tablet to Lord Robert Edward is on the south wall of the nave at St. Michael and All Angels, Great Badminton, which is attached to the family seat, Badminton House.

The 'Somerset Monument' stands high on the Cotswold Edge at Hawkesbury, Gloucestershire (grid reference ST772878), near the family's ancestral home of Badminton, Gloucestershire. It was erected in 1846 and has an inscription in memory of General Lord Robert Somerset.

== Family ==
On 17 October 1805 he married Hon. Louisa Augusta Courtenay (1781 – 8 February 1825), a younger daughter of William Courtenay, de jure 8th Earl of Devon, with whom he had several children, three sons and five daughters:

- Robert Henry Somerset (1806–1807)
- Louisa Isabella Somerset (1807–1888) who died unmarried.
- Frances Caroline Somerset, later Mrs Theophilus Clive (1808–1890) who married 1840 Theophilus Clive (died 1875), and had issue 1 son who left descendants.
- Blanche Somerset, later Mrs Charles Locke (1811–1879) who married 1845, Rev. Charles Courtenay Locke (died 1848) with no issue,
- Matilda Elizabeth Somerset, later Mrs Horace Marryat (1815 – 3 April 1905) who married 1842 Horace Marryat, and had issue two sons: Adrian Somerset Marryat (born 1844) and Frederick Marryat (born 1851), and one daughter Ida Horatia Charlotte Marryat (1843–1910) who married 19 September 1863 (div 1889) Count Gustavus Frederick Bonde (1842–1909), a Swedish nobleman, with issue. The three Marryat children were painted in 1851–2 in Rome by the young Frederick Leighton. Horace Marryat was a much younger brother of the naval officer and writer Frederick Marryat (1792–1848)
- Lieutenant-General Edward Arthur Somerset (1817–1886) married Agatha Miles (1827–1912), daughter of Sir William Miles, Bt and had one son (Lieut Edward William Henry Somerset, 25 January 1866 – 20 March 1890, who died unmarried) and eight daughters.
- Georgina Emily Somerset, later the Hon. Mrs Robert Lawley (born 1819) who married 1852 Hon Robert Neville Lawley (who died 1891), and died without issue.
- Augustus Charles Stapleton Somerset (1821–1854) who died unmarried.

== Ancestry ==
Ancestors of Lord Edward Somerset

Henry Somerset, 2nd Duke of Beaufort
Charles Somerset, 4th Duke of Beaufort
Rachel Noel
Henry Somerset, 5th Duke of Beaufort
John Symes Berkeley
Elizabeth Berkeley
Elizabeth Norborne
Lord Edward Somerset
Hugh Boscawen, 1st Viscount Falmouth
Admiral Rt. Hon. Edward Boscawen
Charlotte Godfrey
Elizabeth Boscawen
William Evelyn Glanville, High Sheriff of Kent
Frances Evelyn Glanville
Frances Glanville

Parliament of Great Britain
Preceded by Sir Charles Thompson, Bt	Member of Parliament for Monmouth; 1799–1801	Succeeded by Parliament of the United Kingdom
Parliament of the United Kingdom
Preceded by Parliament of Great Britain	Member of Parliament for Monmouth; 1801–1802	Succeeded by Lord Charles Somerset
Preceded by George Cranfield Berkeley; Marquess of Worcester	Member of Parliament for Gloucestershire; 1803–1831; With: George Cranfield Berkeley 1803–1810; Viscount Dursley 1810–1811; Sir Berkeley Guise, Bt 1811–1831	Succeeded by Sir Berkeley Guise, Bt; Henry Moreton
Preceded by Lord Apsley; Joseph Cripps	Member of Parliament for Cirencester; 1834–1837; With: Joseph Cripps	Succeeded by Thomas Chester-Master; Joseph Cripps
Military offices
Preceded by Oliver De Lancey	Colonel of the 17th Regiment of (Light) Dragoons (Lancers); 1822–1829	Succeeded by Sir John Elley
Preceded by Sir William Henry Clinton	Lieutenant-General of the Ordnance; 1829–1830	Vacant Title next held by Sir Hew Dalrymple Ross
Preceded by Thomas Garth	Colonel of the 1st (Royal) Regiment of Dragoons; 1829–1836	Succeeded by Sir Frederick Ponsonby
Preceded by Charles Richard Fox	Surveyor-General of the Ordnance; 1834–1835	Succeeded by Sir Rufane Shaw Donkin
Preceded by Francis Hugonin	Colonel of the 4th (The Queen's Own) Regiment of (Light) Dragoons; 1836–1842	Succeeded by Sir Charles Dalbiac
