= Battle of Conjocta Creek =

1814 battle of the War of 1812

Coordinates: 42°56.239′N 78°53.345′W

- Part of the War of 1812
Date	August 3, 1814
Location	Scajaquada Creek, Black Rock and Buffalo, New York
Result	American victory

Belligerents
United States	Great Britain

Commanders and leaders
(United States) Lodowick Morgan	(United Kingdom of Great Britain and Ireland) John Tucker (United Kingdom of Great Britain and Ireland) William Drummond

Strength
240 riflemen	600 regulars

Casualties and losses
2 killed 8 wounded	12 killed 21 wounded

The Battle of Conjocta Creek was an attempt by British forces under the command of Lieutenant Colonel John Tucker to raid the American supply depots at the towns of Black Rock and Buffalo. The Raid was ordered by British Lieutenant General Gordon Drummond in hopes of causing an early American surrender at Fort Erie. On the morning of August 3, 1814, Tucker and his men met a small force of American riflemen under the command of Major Lodwick Morgan.

After fighting for about an hour, Tucker and his men were defeated, and withdrew across the Niagara river to Canada. The battle played a major role in the Siege of Fort Erie's failure, due to the supply post at Black Rock being able to continue supplying the American force defending Fort Erie. This resulted in the British eventually withdrawing from their siege positions around the fort to Chippawa on September 21, 1814.

== Background ==
Following fighting the bloody but indecisive Battle of Lundy's Lane, the American army under the command of Brigadier General Edmund P. Gaines withdrew to Fort Erie, and created additional fortification extending from the actual stone fort, 800 yards southwest along the shore of Lake Erie. Gordon Drummond knew that any attack against the fort would be "An operation of Great Hazard". On August 2, hoping to destroy American supply depots in Buffalo and Black Rock, thus causing an early surrender of the American garrison of Fort Erie, Drummond dispatched Lieutenant Colonel John Tucker, the senior lieutenant colonel of the 41st Regiment of Foot, (Note: The two understrength battalions of the 41st had been amalgamated into a single unit late in 1813, leaving one battalion commander as a supernumary.) with 600 men to raid the two towns.

Tucker's force consisted of two columns; one was composed of the two flank companies and four of the centre companies of the 41st Foot (Note: A British battalion of the time consisted of eight "centre" companies, and one grenadier and one light infantry company, referred to as the "flank" companies, into which the most experienced or proficient soldiers were concentrated.) under Lieutenant Colonel Evans of the 41st, and other of the light companies of the 2nd Battalion, the 89th Foot and the 100th Foot, and the flank companies of the 104th (New Brunswick) Regiment, under Lieutenant Colonel William Drummond of Kelty, General Drummond's nephew. Some artillerymen were attached to the force.

Tucker and his men crossed the Niagara River into New York. They were spotted by American sentries under the command of Major Lodowick Morgan. When word of the British crossing reached Morgan, he had his force of 240 riflemen (most of whom were recruits) remove the planking of a bridge over Conjocta Creek. He then fortified the south side of the creek, and waited for Tucker and his men to arrive.

== Battle ==
In the early morning hours of August 3, 1814 Lieutenant Colonel John Tucker and his force of 600 British regulars advanced from Unity Island, to Conjocta Creek. They were sighted by the Americans at around 4:15 A.M. Tucker, who had decided not to post advance guards was unaware of the American position, until his force was fired on. Morgan had sighted Tucker's force approaching, and letting them get within rifle range blew a whistle, signaling for his men to open fire. The burst of musketry from the Americans inflicted heavy casualties on the lead column of Tucker's troops and "laid a good number of them on the ground". Despite the American fire causing great confusion among the British ranks, the 41st Regiment of Foot, under Tucker's command, charged the bridge only to discover that the planks were gone, and hastily retreated leaving several men dead on the bridge.

The companies of the 104th Regiment began wildly firing at the Americans, before they were put under control. Tucker then chose to form his men into ranks, and to engage in a long range firefight with the Americans. Despite outnumbering their opponents nearly 3 to 1, the British were outgunned by the Americans who were armed with long range rifles, as opposed to the short range Brown Bess muskets carried by Tucker's soldiers. Tucker had his line advance from the cover of the trees, where according to Lieutenant John Le Couteur of the 104th foot, the Americans "shot every fool who came near the bridge". After an hour of fighting, Tucker, realizing the futility of carrying on the engagement, ordered a retreat, and withdrew to the Canadian side of the Niagara.

== Aftermath ==
During the engagement, the British had lost 12 killed and 21 wounded. The Americans had lost 2 killed and 8 wounded. Many of the British troops who fought at Conjocta Creek were bitter about Tucker's handling of the battle. Tucker however blamed the defeat on his troops in a letter to Drummond. Drummond, who was furious about the defeat, sent out a general order criticizing the troops who fought in the battle, causing much resentment in the ranks. With the exception of its two flank companies, the 41st foot was sent back to Fort George several days later. The action had put the Americans on guard, and as a result of the battle at Conjocta Creek, the supply depots that were the objective of the raid were able to keep supplying the fort for the rest of the siege. Because of this, Drummond was unable to force an American surrender, which eventually led to the failed British night assault on August 14.

Shadrack Byfield, a British private soldier, was wounded during the battle and subsequently lost his left forearm to amputation. After returning home, the veteran devised a prosthetic tool to allow him to resume work as a weaver despite his disability; Byfield also recorded his military experiences in a published memoir.

== Sources ==
- Graves, Donald (May 23, 2018). And All Their Glory Past. Robin Brass Studio. p. 31. ISBN 978-1-896941-71-4.
- Graves, Donald (May 23, 2018). Where Right and Glory Lead!. Robin Brass Studio. ISBN 978-1-896941-03-5.
- Shosenberg, James (December 27, 2013). "Bloody Stalemate at Fort Erie, 1814". History Net. HistoryNet.com.
- Winfield, Mason (September 10, 2014). "Lodowick at the Bridge | The Battle of Scajaquada Creek – August 3, 1814". Buffalo Rising.com. Buffalo Rising.
