= Somerset Monument =

Monument to Lord Robert Edward Somerset
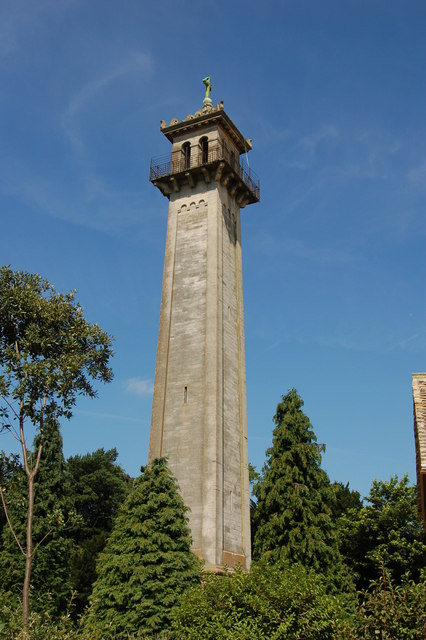

- Location within Gloucestershire
- 51.5872°N 2.3301°W
- Location: Hawkesbury Upton, Gloucestershire, England

History
- Built: 1846

Site notes
- Architect: Lewis Vulliamy

Listed Building – Grade II*
- Official name: Monument to Lord Robert Edward Somerset
- Designated: 10 November 1983
- Reference no.: 1320834

The Somerset Monument north of the village of Hawkesbury Upton, Gloucestershire, England, was built in 1846 to commemorate Lord Robert Edward Somerset. It is a Grade II* listed building, and on the Heritage at Risk register.

== History ==
Lord Robert Edward Somerset was a British soldier who fought during the Peninsular War and the War of the Seventh Coalition. From 1830 sat for Gloucestershire and from 1834 to 1837 was MP for Cirencester.

The memorial was designed by Lewis Vulliamy, and built by staff from the nearby Badminton House estate which was the principal seat of the Dukes of Beaufort since the late 17th century.

== Architecture ==
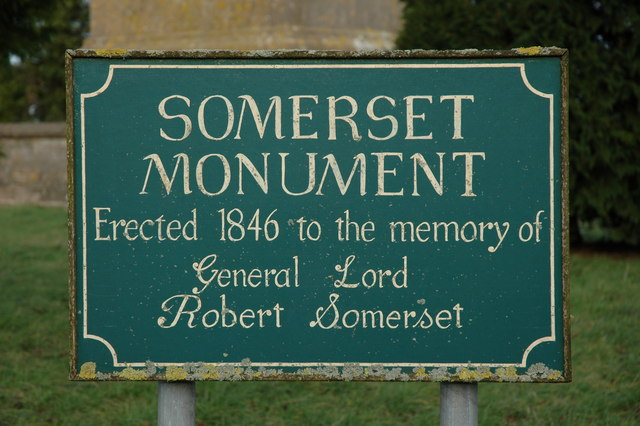
Notice beside the monument

The stone tower is around 100 feet (30 m) high and has a viewing platform at the top. The structure tapers slightly and has four panelled sides. On the southern panel is the arms of the Somerset family.

At the base of the tower is a lodge and ornamental garden.
