= Lulsgate =

Lulsgate may refer to several places in North Somerset, England:

- Bristol Airport, an airport formerly known as Lulsgate
- Lulsgate Plateau, an outlier of the Mendip Hills
- Lulsgate Quarry, a Site of Special Scientific Interest
- Lulsgate Aerodrome, a motor racing circuit
- Lulsgate Bottom, a settlement
