= Yate =

Town in South Gloucestershire, England

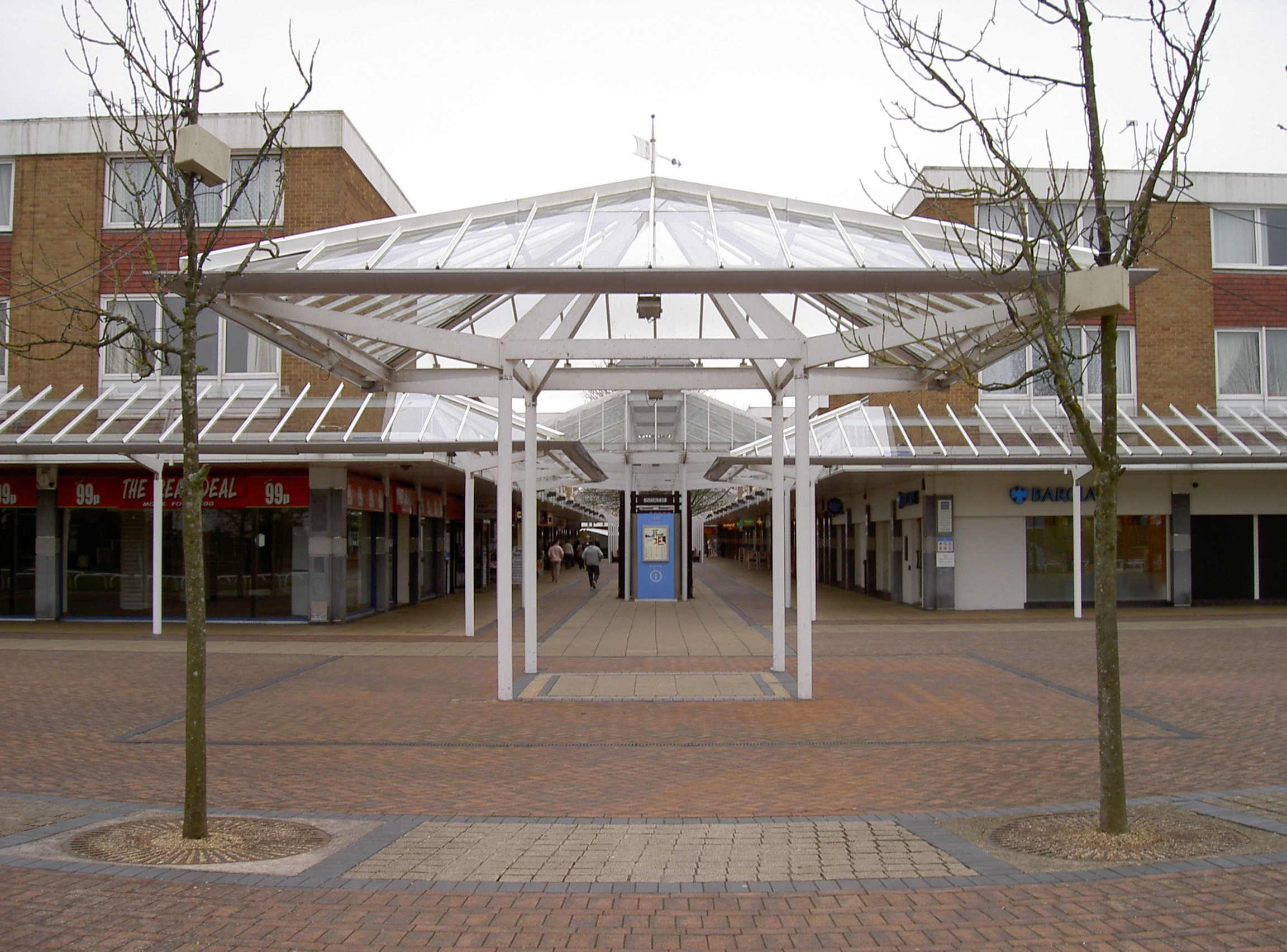
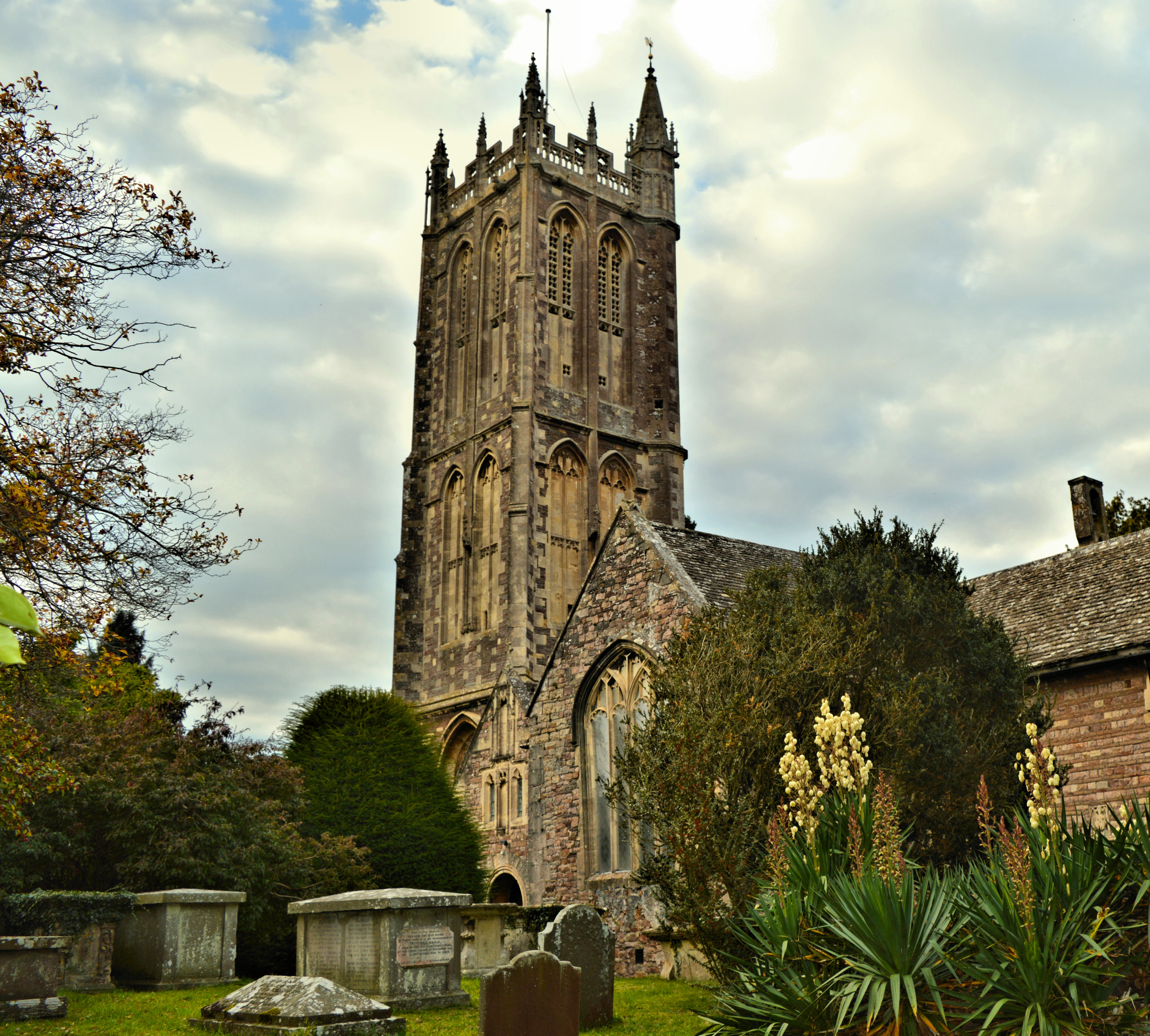
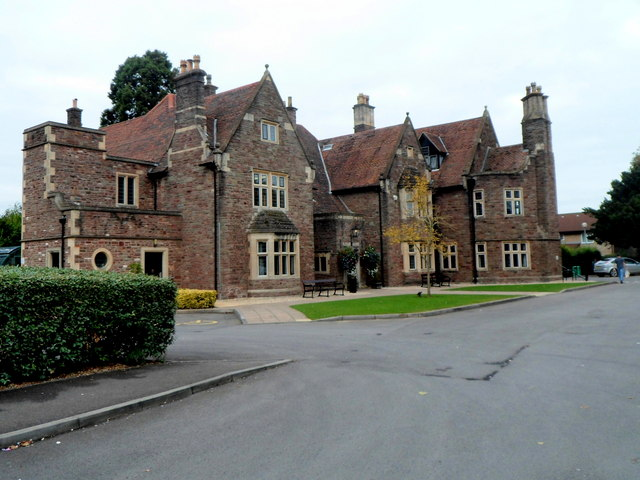
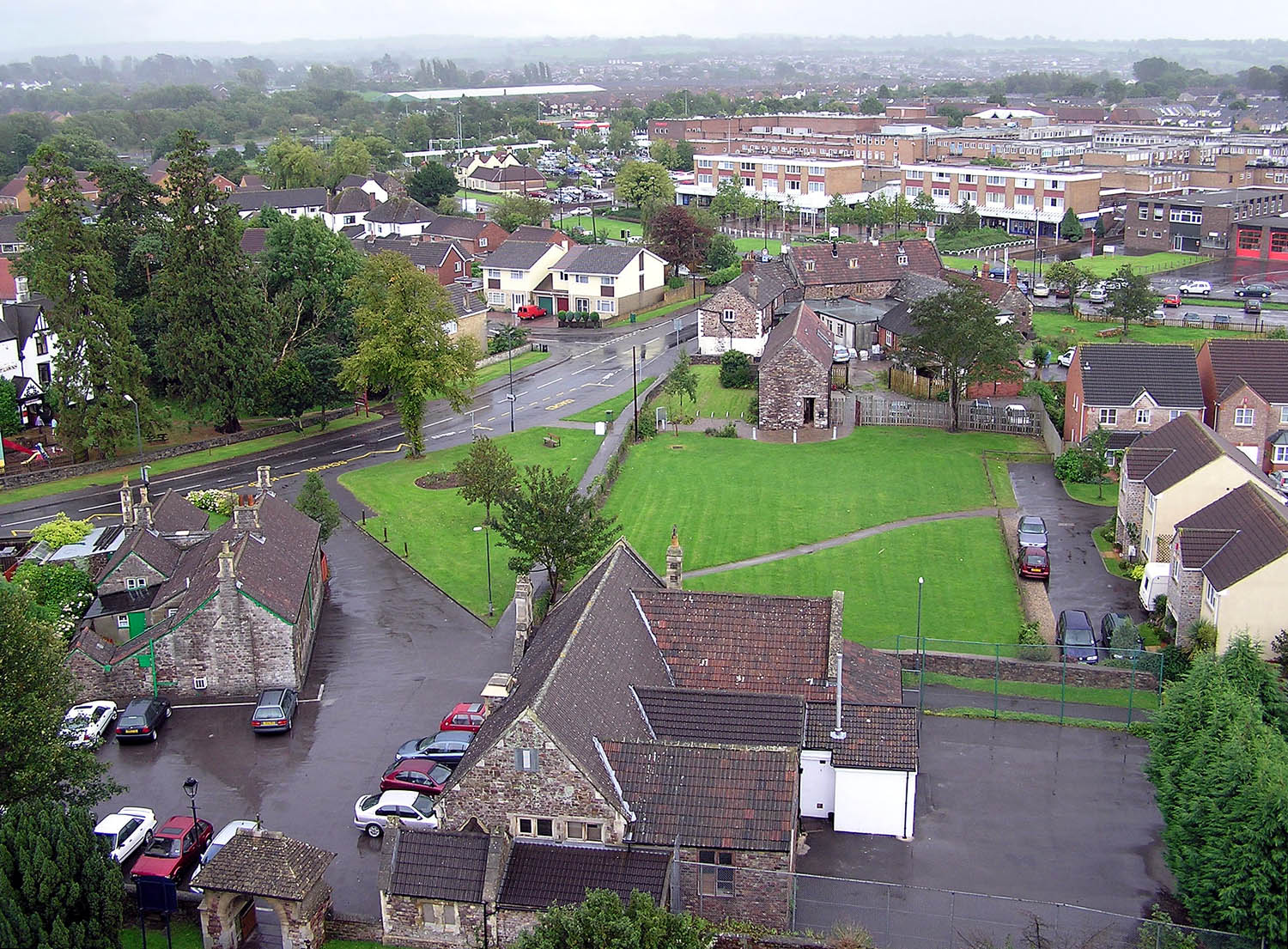
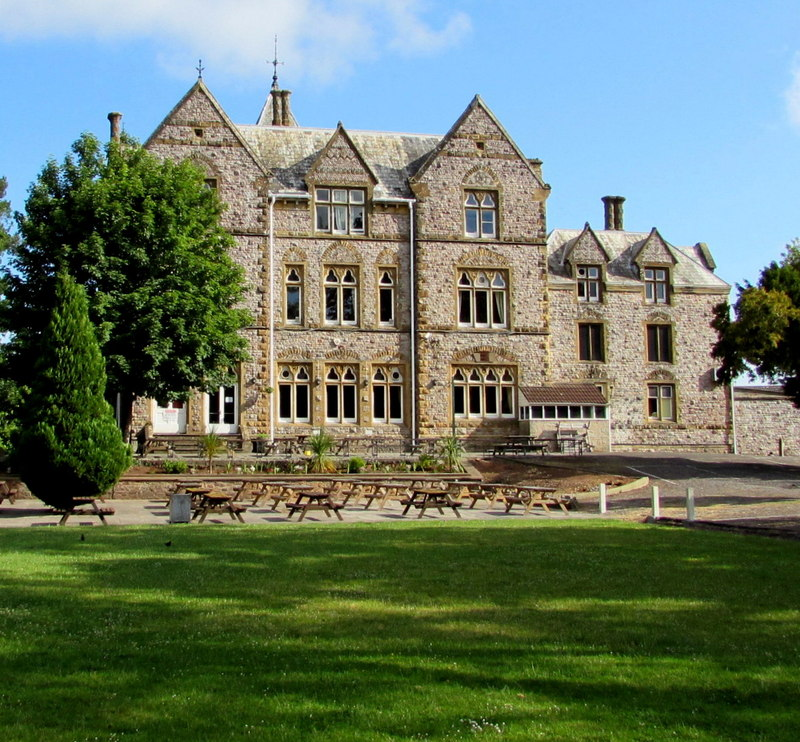
- Clockwise from top: Yate shopping centre, Poole Court, Stanshawes Court, Townscape and St Mary's Church

- Location within Gloucestershire
- Interactive map showing the parish boundary
- Population: 23,701 (2021 census)
- OS grid reference: ST7182
- Civil parish: Yate
- Unitary authority: South Gloucestershire
- Ceremonial county: Gloucestershire
- Region: South West
- Country: England
- Sovereign state: United Kingdom
- Post town: Bristol
- Postcode district: BS37
- Dialling code: 01454
- Police: Avon and Somerset
- Fire: Avon
- Ambulance: South Western
- UK Parliament: Thornbury and Yate

Yate is a town and civil parish in the South Gloucestershire district, in the ceremonial county of Gloucestershire, England. It lies just to the southwest of the Cotswold Hills and is 12 miles (19 kilometres) northeast of Bristol and 12 miles (19 kilometres) from Bath.

Developing from a small village into a town from the 1950s onwards, the 2021 UK census listed Yate's parish population as 23,701. The built-up area, which spills into neighbouring parishes and is contiguous with the market town of Chipping Sodbury to the east, had a population just over 37,000.

== Geography ==
Yate is located to the northeast of Bristol, which is 12 miles (19 kilometres) away by road. Yate is surrounded by countryside and is situated to the south-west of the Cotswolds. The A432 is the main road through Yate and runs through the centre of the town.

== History ==
The first mention of Yate is the existence of a religious house in about AD 770; Yate is also mentioned in the Domesday Book of 1086. The name is derived from the Old English word giete or gete, meaning 'a gateway into a forest area'.

During the Anglo-Saxon period and well into medieval times, most of this part of south Gloucestershire was covered with forest. Through the centuries the land was cleared for farming.

The town's parish church, St Mary's, dates from Norman times. It was altered during the 15th century and was extensively restored in 1970. St Mary's Primary School, situated outside the churchyard walls, was built on the site of a former poorhouse.

It was the opening of the railway station in 1844, as part of Bristol and Gloucester Railway, that established Yate, with Station Road becoming the central thoroughfare. The cattle and produce markets were held around this road, and businesses were established there. Yate railway station was closed by the Beeching cuts in January 1965, but was reopened in May 1989; the Brunel-built engine shed is preserved nearby.

Major growth in Yate started in the early 1920s with the construction of the Moorland Road estates behind Station Road, close to the Parnall aeroplane factory. In the 1950s the Ridge housing estate was developed. The area between these estates was still being mined for celestine and therefore could not be built on until the mineral had been extracted.

In the 1960s Yate was designated as a development area and the building boom began. The creation of a new town included a large retail shopping area, sports and leisure development together with public buildings.

In the 1960s the area around Stanshawes was exhausted of celestine and the housing boom started with the major construction taking place in the south. Much of this development was planned using the Radburn model, a design that created a vehicle-free environment by the use of green spaces and linking paths at the front of the houses. This model was used until the late 1980s and early 1990s, when the planners reverted to traditional street design methods for the development of the remainder of North Yate, Brimsham Park and the Newmans factory site.

When a secondary school was built in the late 1970s, it was supposed to be called Brinsham Green School, after Brinsham Lane at nearby Yate Rocks. Owing to a spelling error, however, it was in fact called Brimsham Green School. The town further expanded in the 1990s and 2000s with the construction of housing at North Yate. This housing estate continued to use the corrupted name of Brimsham. To locals the area is known as Brimsham Park.

=== Yate railway yard ===
During the Second World War, a railway transfer yard was constructed for the United States Army, probably as part of Operation Bolero to assist the buildup of troops and stores before D-Day. Two large storage sheds survived on the site until 2008.

At the end of the Second World War, the site was taken over by the Royal Navy and became known as the Sea Transport Stores Depot. It was occupied by the Highways Agency until the sheds were demolished for development.

Oxford Archaeology has been commissioned to undertake an investigation as to the military significance of this site. The opinion of Bristol Industrial Archaeological Society has also been sought.

== Governance ==
Coat of arms of Yate Town Council

At the lowest level of local government, Yate is a civil parish with a town council of 17 elected members. The council meets at Poole Court, a converted Victorian mansion house.

At upper level of local government, Yate is in South Gloucestershire unitary authority area. For elections to South Gloucestershire Council, the parish is split between Yate North and Yate Central electoral wards, which elect 3 and 2 councillors respectively. A third ward, Dodington, covers the southern part of the built-up area which is outside the parish boundary, and elects 2 councillors.

Yate is an ancient parish, historically part of Henbury Hundred in Gloucestershire. It was in Chipping Sodbury Rural District from 1894, and then the enlarged Sodbury Rural District from 1935. In 1974, it became part of the district of Northavon within the newly formed county of Avon. In 1996, Avon was abolished and Northavon became part of the new unitary South Gloucestershire, returning to the ceremonial county of Gloucestershire. Yate Town Council provides local services.

For elections to the UK Parliament, Yate is in Thornbury and Yate constituency.

== Demographics ==
At the 2021 census, Yate civil parish had a population of 23,701 people in 9,855 households.

The Office for National Statistics also defines three contiguous 'built-up areas' for Yate, Chipping Sodbury and Engine Common. The Yate built-up area had a population of 28,350, and includes parts of Dodington, Westerleigh and Iron Acton parishes to the south and west. The Chipping Sodbury built-up area included part of Yate parish and had a population of 8,025, while Engine Common had a population of 665, giving the conurbation a total population of 37,040.

Census population of Yate parish
Census	Population	Female	Male	Households	Source
2001	21,789	11,098	10,691	8,567	
2011	21,603	10,942	10,661	8,855	
2021	23,701	12,059	11,642	9,855	

== Economy ==
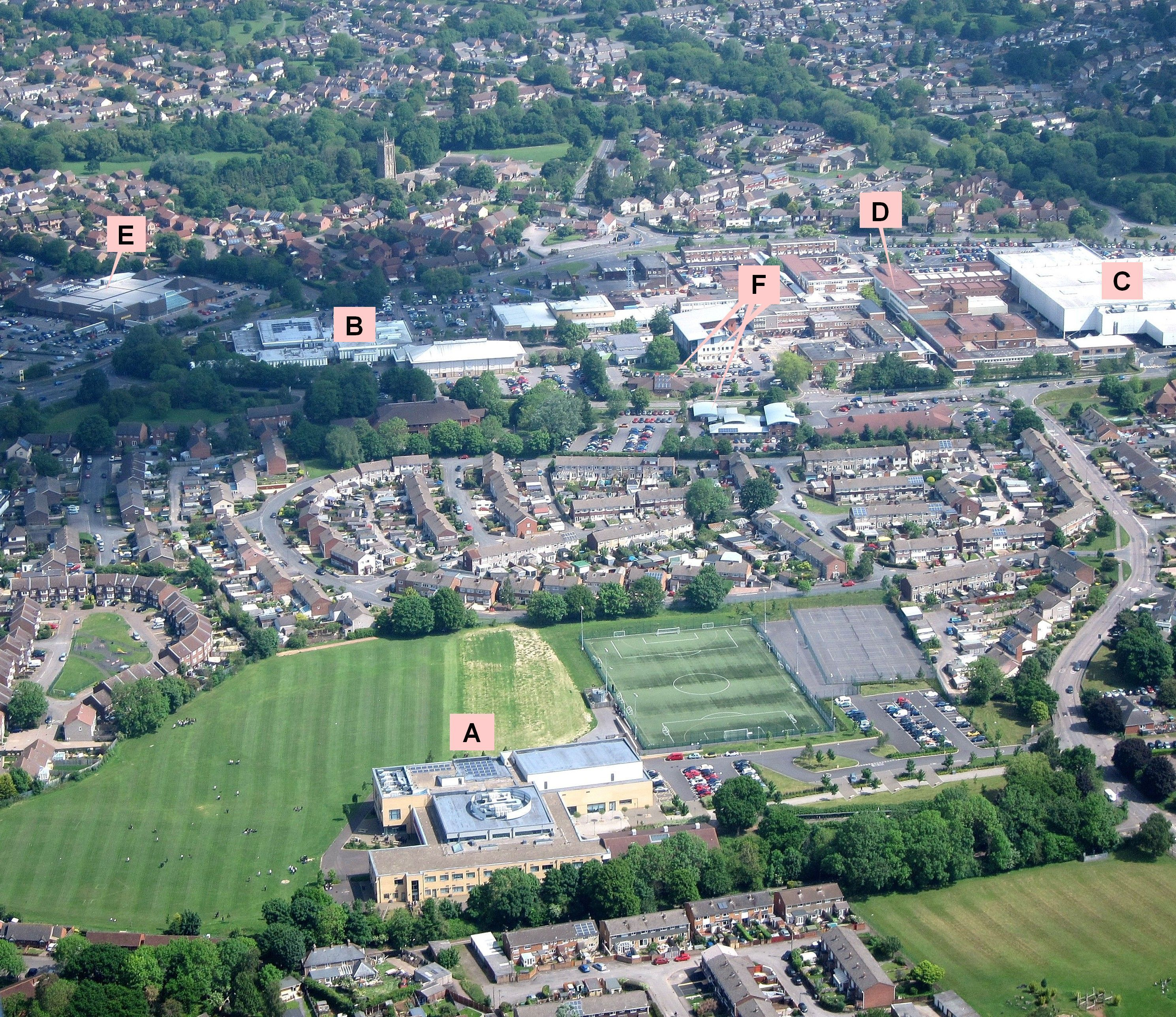
Central Yate from an aircraft (2017), including the sports centre, shopping centre, Yate Academy and the parish church

Before the Second World War, Yate had an aircraft manufacturing industry (Parnall) with a grass aerodrome. During the Second World War, Parnall specialised in making gun turrets. A number of people were killed in raids by the Luftwaffe on the factory in February and March 1941.

Following the war, the Parnall factory turned to the manufacture of domestic goods and was famous for its washing machines. In 1958 Parnall merged with Radiation Ltd to become known as Jackson, producing the Jackson range of cookers. Through mergers and acquisitions, Jacksons is now part of Indesit and the Jackson name is no longer used.

Newman's of Bristol had a large factory on Station Road, from 1932 until the 1980s, in its heyday in the 1960s, employing over 1,500 people.

Yate has had three natural products associated with it: limestone to the east, celestine or spar near the centre of the town and coal to the west.

The need for limestone increased with the growth of roads, while the demand for coal grew with the diminishing supply of timber. Celestine, the major strontium mineral, was first dug in the late 1880s and was initially used for the refining of sugar beet. At one time Yate's celestine accounted for 95 per cent of the world's production. It colours flames red, and so was important for pyrotechnics such as fireworks, military and signal flares and tracer bullets. The last commercial excavation of celestine from the Yate area was for use during the Vietnam War. The mining company, Bristol Mineral and Land Co, closed in 1994.

== Amenities ==
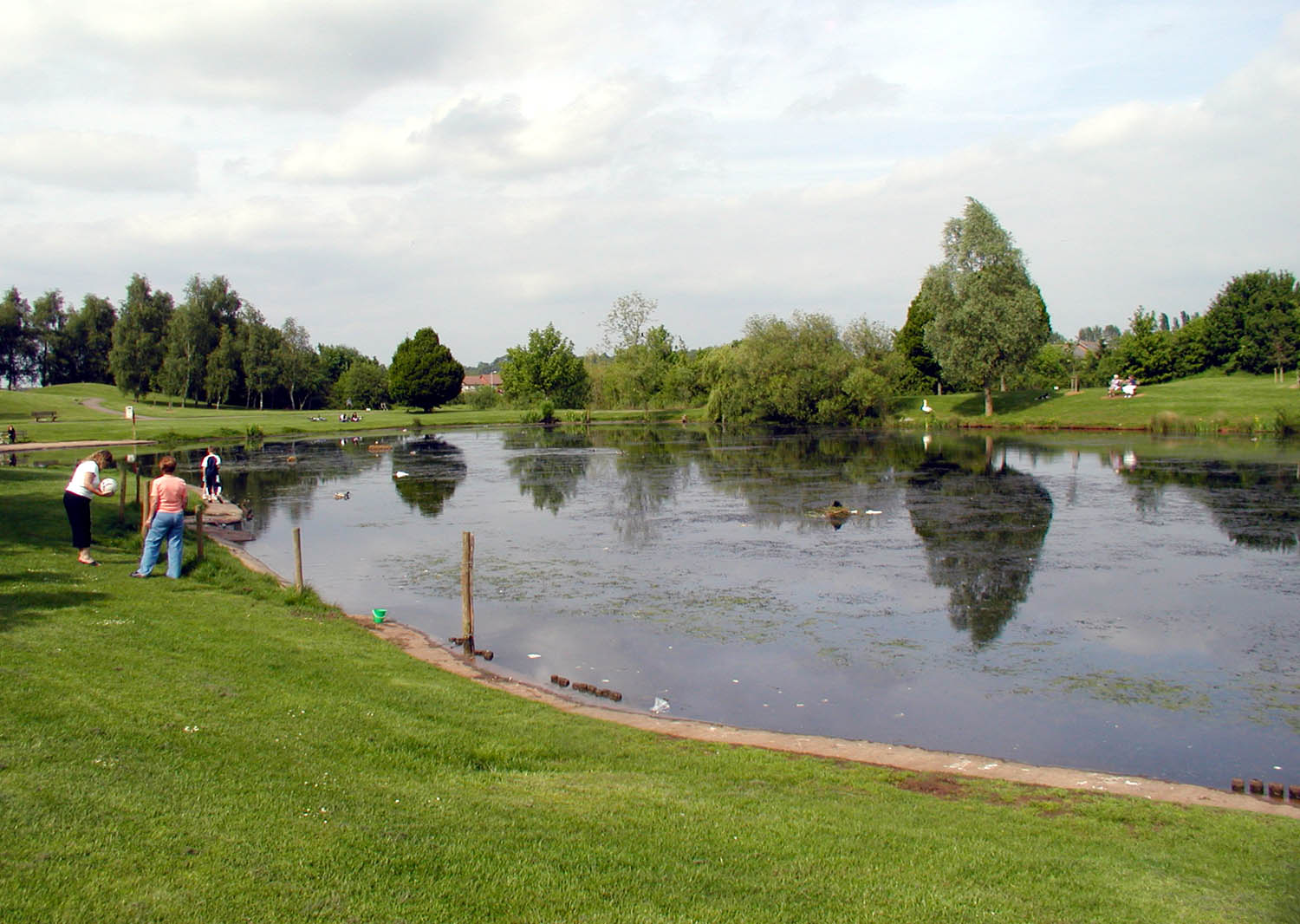
Kingsgate Park

The town has a skatepark at Peghill. Yate Common on Westerleigh Road is used for dog walking, nature watching, kite flying, circuses and fairs.

The common has a stretch of unused dual carriageway (51.532282°N 2.433879°W), known as the "Road to Nowhere", which has been used for filming in TV programmes such as Casualty. This was part of a scheme to create a bypass from Rodford Way in South Yate to Nibley. The scheme was only partially completed in 1974, the year when Yate became a part of Avon. Completion of the road would have entailed building a bridge over the railway, but finance for this was never made available. The town has several parks and areas of open space. The largest of these is Kingsgate Park, which has an adventure playground for children. The town is served by a community radio station, GLOSS FM which broadcasts 365 days a year on its webcasts and twice a year on 87.7 MHz FM. The town benefits from a four appliance fire station, with a retained crew 24 hours and then further tenders staffed on a voluntary basis. Next to the fire station is a 6 bay ambulance station with a further 3 ambulances and 2 response cars stabled outside.

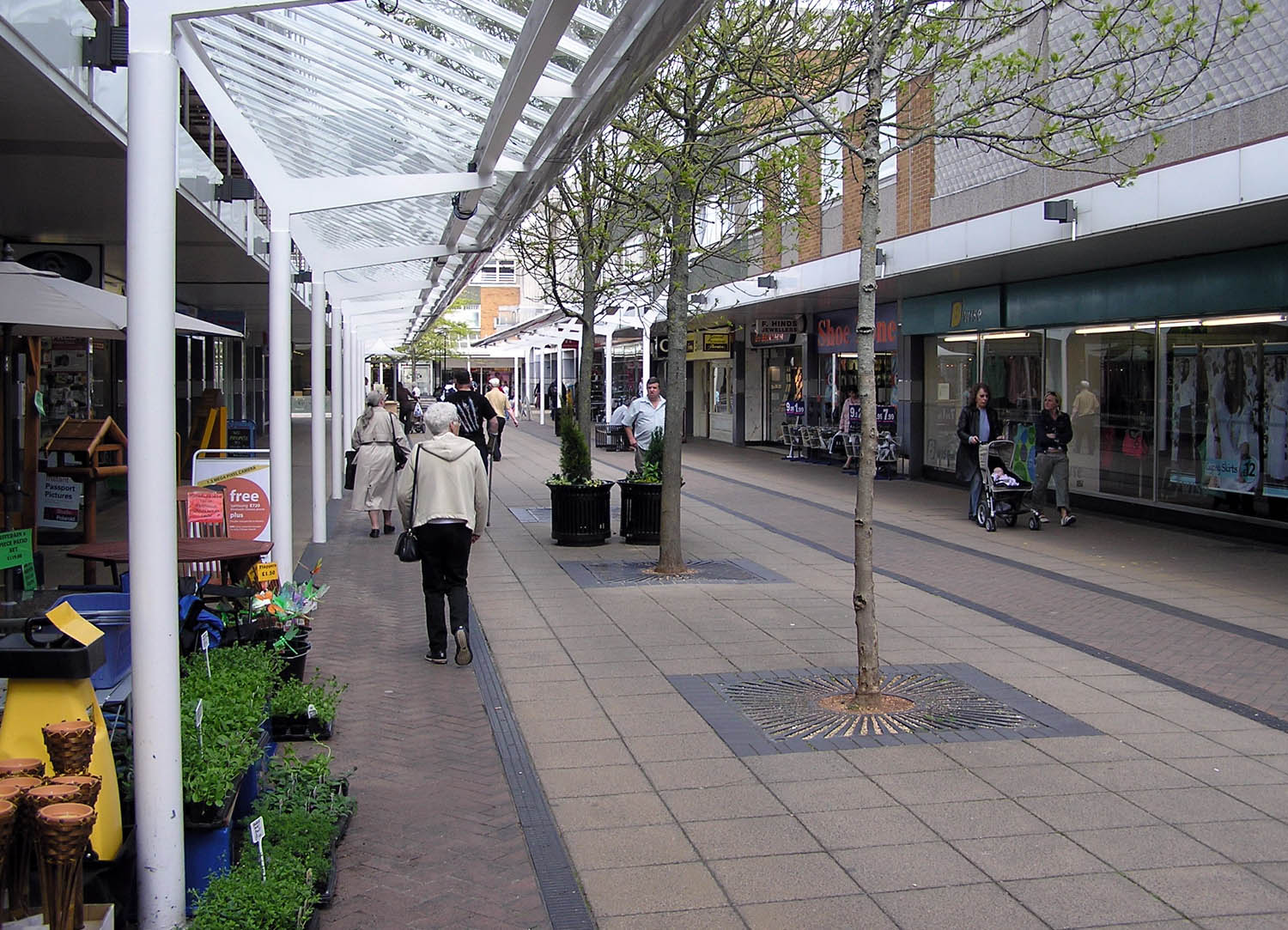
Yate shopping centre has over 100 shops

Construction of a pedestrianised shopping centre of around a hundred shops began in the early-to-mid-1960s. The shopping centre was opened by Patricia Phoenix, Mary Rand and Ted Ray. As in most British new towns, modern art was incorporated, in the form of the Four Seasons sculpture, and a spire-shaped sculpture, which could be seen for miles. This sculpture existed until the early 1990s when it was removed during the revamping of the centre, which included the erection of glass roofs over the walkways. An extension to East Walk was constructed at the start of the 1980s, and an extension to West Walk was constructed in the early 1990s. During the 1980s and into the mid-1990s, the shopping centre hosted Yate's annual festival. On opening day a celebrity launched the festival by releasing balloons. In December 2006, the owners of the shopping centre (Dominion Corporate Trustees) announced plans to enlarge and modernise it.

== Transport ==
=== Railway ===
Yate railway station serves the town. The railway station is located on the main Bristol to Birmingham line between Bristol Parkway and Cam & Dursley, and is operated by Great Western Railway.

=== Buses ===
Bus services within the Yate area are mainly provided by First West of England. Other operators who provide bus services to/from Yate include Coachstyle, Eurocoaches and Stagecoach West.

Regular bus services link Yate with Bristol city centre. There are also buses from Yate running to Bath, Cribbs Causeway, Malmesbury, Tetbury and Westonbirt Arboretum. Additionally, buses link Yate to a number of other towns/villages within South Gloucestershire and west Wiltshire including Acton Turville, Badminton, Charfield, Chipping Sodbury, Downend, Emersons Green, Filton, Fishponds, Frenchay, Iron Acton, Kingswood, Luckington, Pucklechurch, Mangotsfield, Old Sodbury, Sherston, Staple Hill, Thornbury, Tormarton, Westerleigh, Wick, Winterbourne and Wotton-under-Edge.

Yate is also served by the WESTlink on-demand bus, available to the public Monday-Saturday.

Buses in Yate pick up and set down at Yate Bus Station which is at Yate Shopping Centre. A number of bus services also pass Yate railway station. Yate Park and Ride is located at the western edge of the town and has services to the town centre and to Bristol.

== Twin towns ==
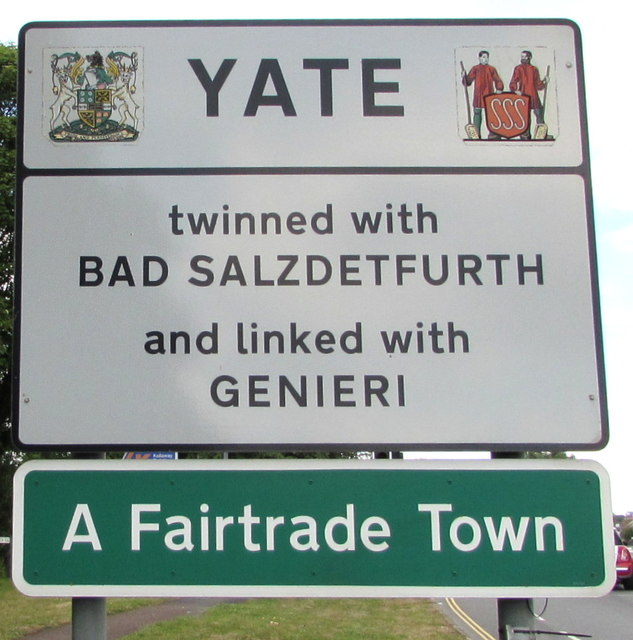

Yate is twinned with Bad Salzdetfurth in Germany and Genieri in The Gambia.

== Media ==
Regional local news and television programmes are provided by BBC West and ITV West Country. Television signals are received from the Mendip TV transmitter. Because of its proximity to Wales, BBC Wales, ITV Cymru Wales and S4C can also be received from the Wenvoe TV transmitter.

Local radio stations are BBC Radio Bristol, Heart West, Smooth Radio Bristol, Greatest Hits Radio South West and community based station, Thornbury Radio.

Yate's local newspapers are the Bristol Post and Gazette Series.

== Sport ==
Yate and District Athletic Club is a track-and-field club based at Yate Outdoor Sports Complex (YOSC). Formed in 1983 by Mike Smith, an eight-lane track was completed in December 1988 and formally opened by Olympian, Lynn Davies in 1989. Floodlighting was added in 1992.

Chipping Sodbury Cricket Club is Yate's nearest cricket club, providing cricket for men, women, boys and girls. They play their home matches on their two grounds at the Ridings playing fields in Chipping Sodbury.

Yate Town F.C. play in the Southern League Southern League Premier Division South. There is also a ladies' football team, Yate Town Girls/Ladies FC, that play in local leagues. Yate is also home to Yate United Youth F.C., the largest local youth only football club, established in 1971. They play their home matches at Yate Outdoor Sports Complex, Sunnyside Playing Fields and Kelston Close playing fields. The largest local club is St. Nicholas F.C. Otherwise known as St. Nick's, this club has a total of 21 teams, including two ladies and one men's team. They play at The Ridings, Wickwar Road, Chipping Sodbury. The women's first team, St Nicholas L.F.C., play in South West Division One of the FA Women's Premier League, and play their home games at Yate Town's ground on Lodge Road.

Yate Hockey Club runs teams from adult to junior. Its home ground is Yate Outdoor Sports Complex, which it shares with Badminton and Pucklechurch Hockey Club.

Yate Rugby Football Club were founded 2016 by club owner and founder Stewart Stacey. The club play their home fixtures at Yate Outdoor Sports Complex. Yate RFC currently play under Gloucestershire RFU, in Bristol & District 2 league they finished fourth place in the 2018/19 season, their highest league position in the club's history. The club have a second team known as Yate Yaks that play friendlies and raise money for charity.

== Notable residents ==
- J.K. Rowling, author of the Harry Potter fantasy series, was born in 1965 at the Chipping Sodbury Maternity Hospital on Station Road, Yate. Until the age of four, she lived with her parents in Sundridge Park, Yate.
- Cole Skuse, (born 29 March 1986) professional footballer.
- Banksy, the renowned graffiti artist, is allegedly originally from Yate.
