= Yate Park and Ride =

Transport scheme in Yate, England

Coordinates: 51°32′25.91″N 2°26′26.66″W

Yate Park and Ride is a park and ride facility located off the A432 road on the edge of Yate.

== History ==
Planning permission was approved in November 2020. It was funded by the West of England Combined Authority. Construction began in March 2021. The facility opened on 7 February 2022. No new bus routes were created for the park and ride, but several existing routes call at the facility.

== Facilities ==
The park and ride has 198 spaces for cars and 46 spaces for bikes.
