= Winford =

Village in Somerset, England

Coordinates: 51.3830°N 2.6603°W

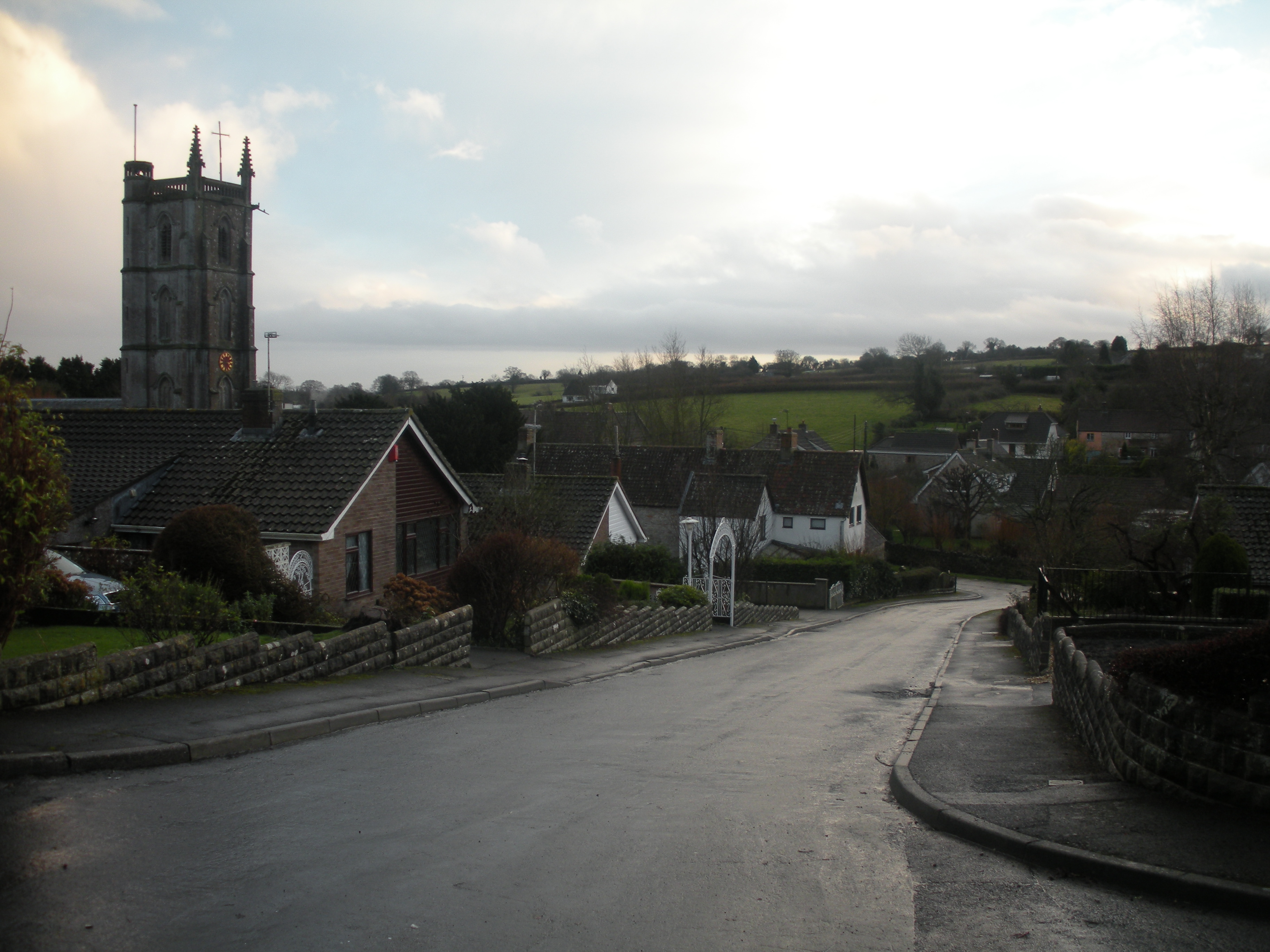
- View of Winford down Church Rise

- Location within Somerset
- Population: 2,153 (2011)
- OS grid reference: ST540651
- Unitary authority: North Somerset
- Ceremonial county: Somerset
- Region: South West
- Country: England
- Sovereign state: United Kingdom
- Post town: BRISTOL
- Postcode district: BS40
- Dialling code: 01275
- Police: Avon and Somerset
- Fire: Avon
- Ambulance: South Western
- UK Parliament: North Somerset

Winford is a village and civil parish within the Chew Valley, Somerset, England. It is within the unitary authority of North Somerset about 8 miles (12.9 km) south of Bristol. The parish has a population of 2,153.

The parish includes the village of Felton which is close to the A38, Bristol International Airport and Hartcliff Rocks Quarry and Lulsgate Quarry Sites of Special Scientific Interest. On Felton Common, between the village and the airport, is the church of St Katharine and the Noble Army of Martyrs, which was built around 1868, and the remains of a windmill which has been converted into a private house.

The small village of Regil also falls within the parish, although it has its own small church dedicated to St James, one pub, a village hall and several farms.

Winford village lies on the route of the Monarch's Way long-distance footpath and has one pub, a village post office and several farms in the surrounding area.

== History ==
Winford was listed in the Domesday Book of 1086 as Wenfre, meaning 'The carriage journey' from the Old English woenfaru. The term journey can also mean route.

The parish was part of the hundred of Hartcliffe.

== Governance ==
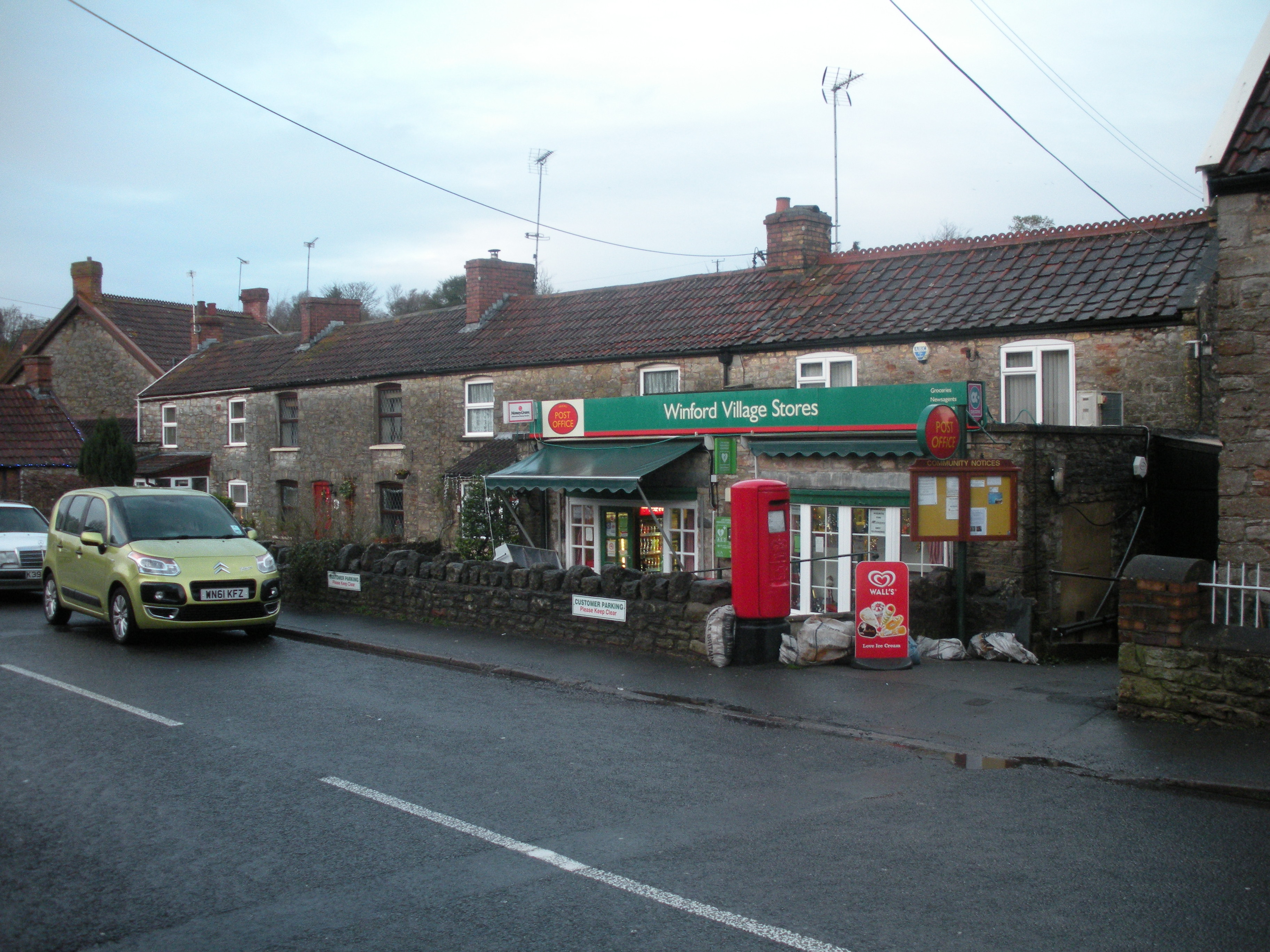
Community store and post office in Winford.

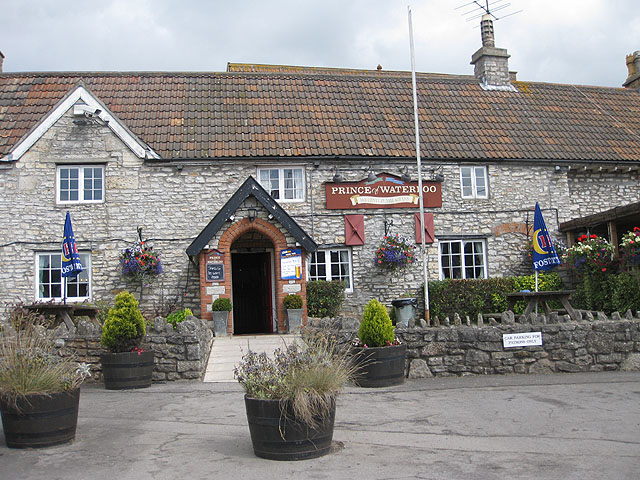
The Prince of Waterloo pub in Winford.

The parish council has responsibility for local issues, including setting an annual precept (local rate) to cover the council's operating costs and producing annual accounts for public scrutiny. The parish council evaluates local planning applications and works with the local police, district council officers, and neighbourhood watch groups on matters of crime, security, and traffic. The parish council's role also includes initiating projects for the maintenance and repair of parish facilities, such as the village hall or community centre, playing fields and playgrounds, as well as consulting with the district council on the maintenance, repair, and improvement of highways, drainage, footpaths, public transport, and street cleaning. Conservation matters (including trees and listed buildings) and environmental issues are also of interest to the council.

The parish falls within the Winford Ward of the unitary authority of North Somerset which was created in 1996, as established by the Local Government Act 1992. It provides a single tier of local government with responsibility for almost all local government functions within its area including local planning and building control, local roads, council housing, environmental health, markets and fairs, refuse collection, recycling, cemeteries, crematoria, leisure services, parks, and tourism. It is also responsible for education, social services, libraries, main roads, public transport, trading standards, waste disposal and strategic planning, although fire, police and ambulance services are provided jointly with other authorities through the Avon Fire and Rescue Service, Avon and Somerset Constabulary and the South Western Ambulance Service.

North Somerset's area covers part of the ceremonial county of Somerset but it is administered independently of the non-metropolitan county. Its administrative headquarters is in the town hall in Weston-super-Mare. Between 1 April 1974 and 1 April 1996, it was the Woodspring district of the county of Avon. Before 1974 that the parish was part of the Long Ashton Rural District.

An electoral ward exists with the same name. The ward starts in the south in Winford, visits Felton and ends in the north at Dundry. The total population of the ward taken at the 2011 census was 2,982.

The parish is represented in the House of Commons of the Parliament of the United Kingdom as part of the North Somerset constituency. It elects one Member of Parliament (MP) by the first past the post system of election, currently Sadik Al-Hassan of the Labour Party.

== Ecology ==
Felton Common is a local nature reserve which consists of open calcareous grassland with scrub and bracken. There are birds including kestrel, skylark, song thrush, willow warbler, spotted flycatcher and several species of insects.

== Winford Hospital ==
Primarily an orthopaedic Hospital, Winford Hospital was built in 1930.

Winford hospital was a part-military and part-civilian hospital. Wards A to D were for civilian use, while wards E to K, added to the hospital in 1940, were for treatment of war casualties (both service and civilian).

In 1964 a physiotherapy department was opened, including several treatment rooms and a hydrotherapy pool.

Winford Hospital was closed in 1996. The land has since been redeveloped as a small housing estate, known locally as Winford Heights.

== Demographics ==
According to the 2001 Census the Winford Ward, had 1,316 residents, living in 527 households, with an average age of 41.9 years. Of these 73% of residents describing their health as 'good', 26% of 16- to 74-year-olds had no qualifications; and the area had an unemployment rate of 1.8% of all economically active people aged 16–74. In the Index of Multiple Deprivation 2004, it was ranked at 22,024 out of 32,482 wards in England, where 1 was the most deprived LSOA and 32,482 the least deprived.

== Church ==
The Church of The Blessed Virgin Mary and St Peter in Winford dates from the 15th century. The 4-stage west tower has set back buttresses, moulded string courses and the north-east corner has a polygonal stair turret. Trefoil-headed open panel parapet with corner crocketted pinnacles and fine gargoyles. Top 3 stages have 2-light openings with hoodmoulds and lozenge stops, those below bell stage blind, those to bell stage louvred. First stage of west facade has deeply moulded pointed-arched doorway with 2-leaf doors and applied Gothick mouldings; light with intersecting tracery above. Atop this is a 3-light Gothic window. An unidentified and Shire Monuments in churchyard are also listed (Historic England. "Unidentified and Shire Monuments (1129215)". National Heritage List for England.)

== Powdermill Farmhouse ==
Littleton gunpowder works is a Grade II* listed building.

== Beech Court (formerly The Rectory) ==
A Grade II* listed building (Historic England. "Beech Court (1129217)". National Heritage List for England.)

== Grade II listed buildings ==
- (Historic England. "Court Farmhouse (1129214)". National Heritage List for England.)
- (Historic England. "Aqueduct to east of the Church of St Mary and Peter (1129231)". National Heritage List for England.)
- (Historic England. "The Meadows (1245212)". National Heritage List for England.)
- (Historic England. "Coach House and stables adjoining No 1 The Meadows (1245213)". National Heritage List for England.)
- (Historic England. "Kentshare Farmhouse (1320917)". National Heritage List for England.)
- (Historic England. "Barn to south west of Powerdermill Farmhouse (1158144)". National Heritage List for England.)
- (Historic England. "Clock Tower at Powdermill Cottage (1129216)". National Heritage List for England.)
- (Historic England. "Gate piers to SW of the Parsonage (1129235)". National Heritage List for England.)
- (Historic England. "Gatepiers and Walls at Beech Court (1158149)". National Heritage List for England.)
- (Historic England. "Regilbury Farmhouse (1264747)". National Heritage List for England.)
- (Historic England. "Yew Tree Farmhouse (1320918)". National Heritage List for England.)
- (Historic England. "Felton House (1320919)". National Heritage List for England.)
- (Historic England. "New Farmhouse (1129218)". National Heritage List for England.)
- (Historic England. "Hollyhedge Farmhouse (1129219)". National Heritage List for England.)
- (Historic England. "Aqueduct, Watery Lane (1158298)". National Heritage List for England.)
