= Light rail in Bristol =

Proposed light rail systems in Bristol, United Kingdom

- Location: Greater Bristol, United Kingdom
- Proposer: West of England Combined Authority
- Status: Feasibility studies underway
- Type: Light rail/Rapid transit
- Cost estimate: £4.5 billion

The city of Bristol in the United Kingdom has included a light rail transport system in its plans from the 1980s onwards. There has been no light rail in the city since the closure of Bristol Tramways in 1941.

== History ==
=== Background ===
Plans for a metro system were promoted by then MEP Richard Cottrell, and were unveiled in November 1987 under the title of Advanced Transport for Avon; the first route, from Wapping Wharf to Portishead and Portbury, was due to open by 1991 with the entire system complete by the late 1990s. The Parliamentary bill for the first route received royal assent in May 1989, but after objections from the Port of Bristol and Bristol South MP Dawn Primarolo, along with financial difficulties, the scheme folded with debts of £3.8 million.

Following the demise of ATA, Avon County Council proposed a light rail project known as The Westway, which consisted of a route from the city centre following the Filton Bank railway line to Bradley Stoke, and a loop line through South Bristol. The first phase of this project was estimated to cost £400 million. The project never materialised due to the 1996 abolition of Avon as a county.

=== 2001–2004: Bristol Supertram ===
The Bristol Supertram project proposed a light rail line from Bristol city centre to Aztec West, in part running alongside the Great Western Railway line from Temple Meads railway station to Bristol Parkway. The project received royal assent but issues arose between Bristol City Council and South Gloucestershire, the latter wishing for the route to be extended to serve Cribbs Causeway. As the extension was deemed unfeasible, South Gloucestershire withdrew support, and in March 2004, Bristol Council announced that the Supertram project would be cancelled. This allowed funds that were set aside for the project to be used to cover a projected council tax increase instead. In 2005, an article in the Bristol Evening Post stated that Bristol City Council had spent £1.5 million on Supertram between 1998 and 2004.

=== 2004–2017: Focus on bus-based transport ===
After the demise of the Supertram scheme, the transport focus for the region moved to buses, with a bus rapid transit scheme first being discussed by the West of England Local Enterprise Partnership in 2006. The MetroBus network began construction in 2015 and opened in stages in 2018 and 2019, at a cost of £230 million (including work which benefitted other road users). No mention of light rail was made until November 2016, when the West of England LEP began a consultation process on their Transport Vision Summary document, outlining potential light rail/tram routes from the city centre to Bristol Airport, the eastern and north west fringes of the city, and a route along the A4 road to Bath.

=== 2017–present: Development under the West of England Combined Authority ===
In July 2017, a leaked draft of a document due to be published in October 2017 suggested an underground rail network around the most built-up areas of the city as one of many solutions to congestion; the construction cost was estimated to be at least £8.9 billion. The full document had detailed analysis of a potential mass transit network with underground sections, with the rail route to the airport considered to be the best value for money, and most meeting the needs of this particular transport corridor. In September 2017, Bristol mayor Marvin Rees vocally supported the creation of an underground line in the city. The service would run from Bristol Airport to Temple Meads, the centre and north of Bristol and then to Cribbs Causeway, and would cost an estimated £2.5bn. The city council commissioned a £50,000 study to determine the financial viability of the project and Rees suggested £3m for a geological survey.

In January 2018, Bristol City Council announced that the project could cost £4 billion for three lines, including the initial airport-city centre route, as well as another heading north and a third heading east. It was suggested that the eastern route could run as a light rail track alongside the Bristol and Bath Railway Path, which would not have to close.

According to the city's 2050 vision document, published in 2018, the first mass transit route could have begun construction in 2022 and be completed by 2028, with the entire four-line network complete by 2034.

By March 2020, Transport Xtra reported that plans for the network were "still at the embryonic stage so only scant detail is available". Rees acknowledged that a 2022 start date was an "ambitious plan. But we've got to have ambition. With the population growing, and people becoming more car-dependent, we'll end up paying the price down the line. The transport problems we are dealing with in Bristol today is because of 40 or 50 years of failure to have any ambition." He further explained that a mass transit system is "the right thing for the city. Engineering-wise, it is perfectly possible to deliver. There are growing numbers of people in the travel to work areas [in Bristol], so there is a strong enough passenger base to make it viable. And those numbers are going to grow, so we need to take this opportunity to take millions of car journeys off Bristol's roads and develop the transport system that a world-class city needs."

In February 2019, the West of England Combined Authority agreed to spend £200,000 to further develop an outline business case for the network, under guidance from the Department for Transport. Full business cases to meet funding requirements from DfT were estimated to cost around £100 million and take around six years to complete. In June 2019, Rees reiterated that the case for an underground rail line in Bristol depended on the growth of Bristol Airport. Speaking at an event for Clean Air Day, he stated "We will also use the growth of Bristol Airport to strengthen the financial case for Bristol's mass transit system which we hope will be the means by which we takes millions of car journeys off of Bristol's roads and the carbon and nitrogen dioxide they bring. The weaker the airport, the weaker the business case for the underground. So you will need 10 words to explain how you will secure the investment the underground will need and avoid us being trapped in the current, inadequate arrangements."

Following a meeting in July 2019, WECA awarded another £1.3 million to further develop mass transit proposals; to look in more detail at demand, the scope of the project, and its potential outputs and benefits. Bristol City Council's Growth and Regeneration Scrutiny Commission the same month noted the network's "final proposal could be a mixture of on-street and underground running based on corridor characteristics and demand". Adam Crowther, the Council's head of strategic city transport, said: "The one thing we probably won't have is the Tube. If you think of the London Underground, we're not going to have eight-carriage long trains running around. That would be far too much capacity for this region." The Bristol Transport Strategy published the same month gave mention to the potential use of VAL technology, following the example of light metro systems in Rennes, Toulouse, Turin, Lille and Taipei.

As part of plans for upgrades to Bristol Temple Meads railway station, Network Rail confirmed in early 2020 that it was assessing potential underground entrances to the mass transit system. In late 2020, Rees said that the proposals were "moving on" but it was not a scheme that could be completed quickly.

In November 2022, Mayor Rees made public the mass transit system's 2017 pre-feasibility study produced by CH2M and Steer Davies Gleave, and the 2019 Early Options Development Report, undertaken by engineering group Jacobs Steer. The CH2M report outlined the potential demand for an underground network and the ground conditions of the city, which were found to be favourable for tunnelling.

In the Jacobs report, four mass transit corridors were analysed in further detail; radial routes from Bristol city centre serving southern, northern, northeastern and southeastern areas. Options considered included overground routes using bus rapid transit (BRT) or light rail/trams, and underground options with technology type to be confirmed. Underground options on all four corridors were taken forward for further analysis.

For the overground options, tram/light rail technology was considered more disruptive than BRT to the roads they would be built on for the northern and southern corridors, with BRT recommended for further consideration. For the northeastern corridor, only an underground option was taken forward, with all other proposals seen to be too disruptive to the area. On the southeast route, a tram option and a BRT option were both taken forward for further study.

Helen Godwin, elected as Mayor of the West of England in May 2025, gave "reliable buses and trains" as one of her three priorities. In July 2026, prime minister Andy Burnham voiced his support for Godwin's plans to develop mass transit.

== Potential network ==
The four mass transit corridors analysed in the 2022 Jacobs Steer report were:

- Route 1: Bristol Temple Meads to Bristol Airport
- Route 2: Bristol Temple Meads to Aztec West and a new Park & Ride at Almondsbury
- Route 3: Bristol Temple Meads to Bristol and Bath Science Park
- Route 4: Bristol Temple Meads to Hicks Gate or Keynsham

An overground BRT route on Route 1 was projected in 2018 prices to cost £370 million, and consist of 12.15 km (7.55 mi) of route from Temple Meads to the airport via Bedminster and the A38 road southward. Stops would be every 500m, serving key locations such as East Street in Bedminster, Parson Street railway station and a new A38 South Park & Ride at the junction with the South Bristol link road. The underground option for Route 1 was projected to cost £1.12 billion, and consisted of a 9 km (5.6 mi) underground route from Temple Meads serving stations at Daventry Road (Knowle), Hengrove Park, Symes Avenue (Hartcliffe), Highridge Road (Bishopsworth) and the A38 South Park & Ride, where the route would then emerge for 6.8 km (4.2 mi) to the surface towards the airport.

Route 2 was projected to cost £220 million as a 12.6 km (7.8 mi) overground BRT, or £1.55 billion as a 14 km (8.7 mi) underground route. The overground option would start at Temple Meads and follow the A38 northward to a new Park & Ride at Almondsbury, with stops every 500m. The underground option would serve stations at Callowhill Court (Broadmead), Bristol bus station, The Arches (Montpelier), Longmead Avenue (Bishopston), Horfield Common, Southmead Hospital, Filton, the new Brabazon development, Cribbs Causeway, Aztec West and Almondsbury P&R.

The only option seen as viable for Route 3 was a £1.05 billion, 10 km (6.2 mi) underground route from Temple Meads to Bristol and Bath Science Park via Lawrence Hill railway station, St George's Park, Kings Chase Shopping Centre (Kingswood) and Staple Hill Park.

For Route 4, the overground BRT or tram route would be either a 7.55 km (4.69 mi) or 8.35 km (5.19 mi) route, the former using the A4 road for its whole length or using former trackbed of the Bristol and North Somerset Railway in Brislington. The former option was projected to cost £130 million as a BRT and £590 million as a tram, and the latter £170 million as BRT or £650 million as a tram. Overground options were not considered feasible to extend to Keynsham, and would terminate at the new Park & Ride at Hicks Gate. An entirely underground route, at a cost of £890 million, would be 7.5 km (4.7 mi) in length, starting at Temple Meads and serving St Philip's Marsh, Arnos Vale, Brislington, the current Brislington Park & Ride (which is due to be relocated and replaced with new homes), a new Park & Ride at the Hicks Gate roundabout, and a terminus at Keynsham railway station.

=== Projected passenger numbers ===
The forecast annual demand for the mass transit system was projected to be 42.3 million if all four routes were underground, and 20.7 million for three of the four overground routes (excluding Route 3, for which an underground-only route was taken forward), based on demand in the morning peak. Each line was projected as follows:

- Route 1: 13.2 million if underground, 7.9 million if overground BRT
- Route 2: 8.6 million if underground, 6.4 million if overground BRT
- Route 3: 9.6 million as underground only
- Route 4: 8.9 million if underground, 5.2 million if overground tram or BRT

An extra 2.0 million per annum (1.3 million for overground options) was added to account for contra-flow traffic – peak travel from central Bristol to the outlying areas.

== See also ==
- Proposed transport developments in Bristol
- MetroWest (Bristol)
- Rapid transit in the United Kingdom
