= Bristol Airport Rail Link =

Proposed rail line in England

Overview
- Status: Proposed
- Termini: Bristol Temple Meads railway station or Bristol city centre; Bristol Airport

Service
- Type: Rapid transit, light rail, airport rail link

Technical
- Line length: approx. 15 km (9.3 mi)
- Character: Urban

The Bristol airport rail link is a proposed light or heavy rail line to serve Bristol Airport in southwest England. The project is currently under consideration by the West of England Local Enterprise Partnership as a means to address "poor connectivity between North Somerset, Bristol Airport and Bristol".

== History ==
In November 2006 the airport's Master Plan stated that "the provision of a direct rail service is not a realistic prospect".

The first mention of a potential airport rail link was in November 2015 in the West of England Local Enterprise Partnership's Joint Transport Study Key Principles Report as a future transport concept. Then in July 2016 the airport's chief executive officer Robert Sinclair discussed the possibility of a light rail link to the airport. The West of England LEP subsequently announced their application to the Department for Transport’s Large Local Major Transport Schemes fund for the "South West Bristol Economic Link" – a strategy designed to address "poor connectivity between North Somerset, Bristol Airport and Bristol". It was also reported in the Bristol Evening Post in September 2016 that North Somerset Council had applied to the government for "nearly £2 million in funding to draw up proposals to improve links on the A38 between the city and the expanding Bristol Airport", which included new road options as well as a light or heavy rail line. In October 2016 the local authorities proposed £7.5 billion in public transport investments for the West of England, including the airport rail link.

In early 2017 a light rail link to the airport was listed as an election promise in the upcoming West of England mayoral election, 2017 by Liberal Democrat candidate Stephen Williams and independent candidate Dr John Savage. In late 2017 an updated airport Master Plan was completed, with a railway line part of the options being considered to cater to increasing airport passenger numbers. From 2017 onward, Mayor of Bristol Marvin Rees has proposed an underground line which would link Bristol Temple Meads with Bristol Airport and has commissioned a study into the proposals. As of 2020, the proposed implementation of a four-line mass transit network with underground sections was under review.

== Route ==
The West of England LEP's Option Development Report, published in 2016, outlined various possible routes for the new railway line:

- A direct link to the airport from Bristol Temple Meads railway station, branching from the Bristol to Exeter line from Long Ashton, was considered to be a "fully segregated high quality link to the airport, which should provide short journey times" with "good connections with wider rail network at Bristol Temple Meads" despite a significant altitude gain between the railway line and the airport – of around 150 metres (500 ft) – for which a light rail option was seen to be more flexible.
- A link via Yatton was considered due to the possibility of using the old trackbed of the Strawberry Line and the Wrington Vale Light Railway, which is mostly still undeveloped. Again, a gain in altitude is considered to be a potential hindrance to this idea.
- Conversion of the then-upcoming Ashton Vale to Temple Meads and South Bristol Link MetroBus routes to light rail, then following the A38 to the airport is described as reaching more of Bristol city centre than other options, while being less time efficient. In December 2016 the director of Taylor Wimpey stated that the light rail option along the A38 was also being looked at to serve the proposed development known as The Vale.

In October 2017, the West of England Joint Transport Study - Executive Summary described the scheme as a "fully segregated mass transit route connecting Bristol Airport and South Bristol to city centre, with options to be considered for underground running. Route to be determined balancing maximising patronage against engineering costs (options comprise via Ashton Vale, via Hartcliffe Way, via Parson Street/Bedminster, or a segregated route via South Bristol)."

== See also ==
- Light rail in Bristol
- Proposed transport developments in Bristol
- Airport rail link
