= Church of St Mary and St Peter, Winford =

Church in Somerset, England

Church of St Mary and St Peter
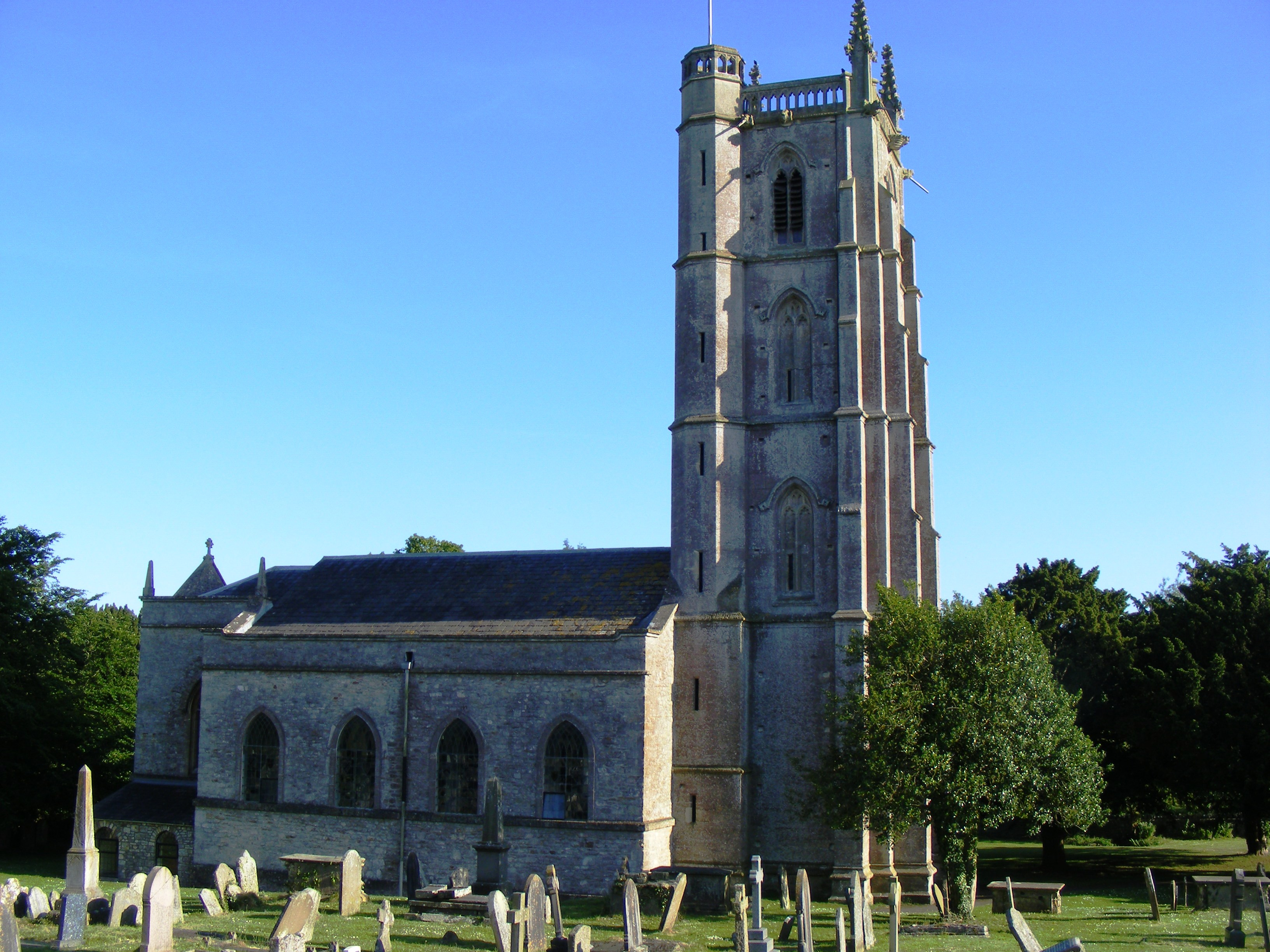

- Location within Somerset
- 51°22′57″N 2°39′29″W
- Location: Winford, Somerset, England

History
- Built: 15th century

Listed Building – Grade II*
- Designated: 11 October 1981
- Reference no.: 1320916

The Anglican Church of St. Mary and St. Peter in Winford, Somerset, England, dates from the 15th Century. It has been designated as a Grade II* listed building.

The main body of the original church was rebuilt in 1796 however the tower, which was built around 1437, survives.

The church consists of a nave, chancel and north and south aisles along with the four-stage west tower which is supported by set back buttresses and has a small polygonal stair turret from the roof. Around the tower is a trefoil-headed parapet with corner crocketted pinnacles and gargoyles on the corners. The tower has eight bells. The original six bells were re-tuned and augmented with two new bells in 2006.

The interior holds a font and wooden pulpit. There is some stained glass which is decorated with heraldic shields and a canvas coat of arms beneath the tower. An unidentified monument and a Shire Monument dating from around 1764 in the churchyard are also listed.

The parish is part of the benefice of Winford with Felton Common within the Diocese of Bath and Wells.

== See also ==
- List of Somerset towers
- List of ecclesiastical parishes in the Diocese of Bath and Wells
