= Genieri =

Village in the Lower River Division, The Gambia

- Location in the Gambia
- Coordinates: 13°24′52.67″N 15°37′5.24″W
- Country: The Gambia
- Division: Lower River Division
- District: Kiang East

Population (2009)
  - Total: 694 (est.)

Genieri is a village in mid-central Gambia. It is located in Kiang East District in the Lower River Division. As of 2009, it has an estimated population of 694. Located around 110 km from the capital of Banjul, Genieri is predominantly Mandinka. According to the founding story of the village, Genieri was founded sometime in the early-to-mid 19th century by a man named Mamba Sanneh.

== Twining with Yate ==
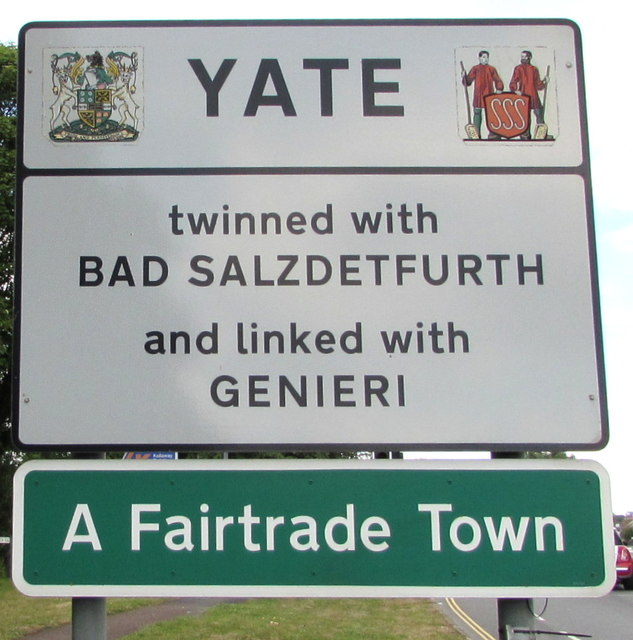
Road sign in Yate referencing its twin town Genieri, The Gambia

Genieri is twinned with Yate, a town in Gloucestershire, England, a link that arose in 1986 as an initiative by a group of students. Yate has been active in funding development in Genieri.

== Community development ==
In November 2018, the people of Genieri financed the development of a self-sufficient water source. Genieri is home to a “Youth Skill Tailoring Centre”, opened in 2014.

== Health and COVID-19 ==
In 2018, Genieri was struck by a malaria epidemic, which killed an 18-year-old boy. Genieri was able to afford treatment for all cases of Malaria thanks to a donation from Yate, though the village was still severely affected by it and was still recovering as of February 2019. As of October 2020, Genieri had not been directly hit by the COVID-19 pandemic, but lockdowns imposed by the Gambian government had negatively impacted the town's economy by preventing villagers from commuting to nearby towns for work. The lockdown had also caused a severe food shortage.
