= Hartcliff Rocks Quarry =

Geological Site of Special Scientific Interest in Somerset, England

- Site of Special Scientific Interest
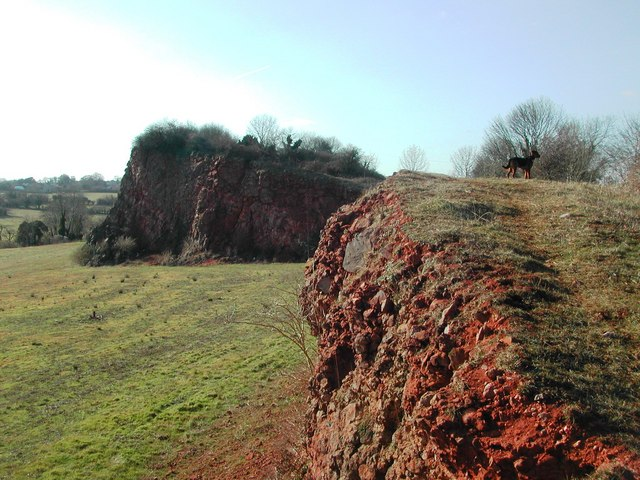

- Location within Somerset
- Location of Hartcliff Rocks Quarry.
- Area of search: Avon
- Grid reference: ST534662
- Coordinates: 51.39291°N 2.67115°W
- Interest: Geological
- Area: 1.6 hectares (0.016 km^{2}; 0.0062 sq mi)
- Notification date: 1991

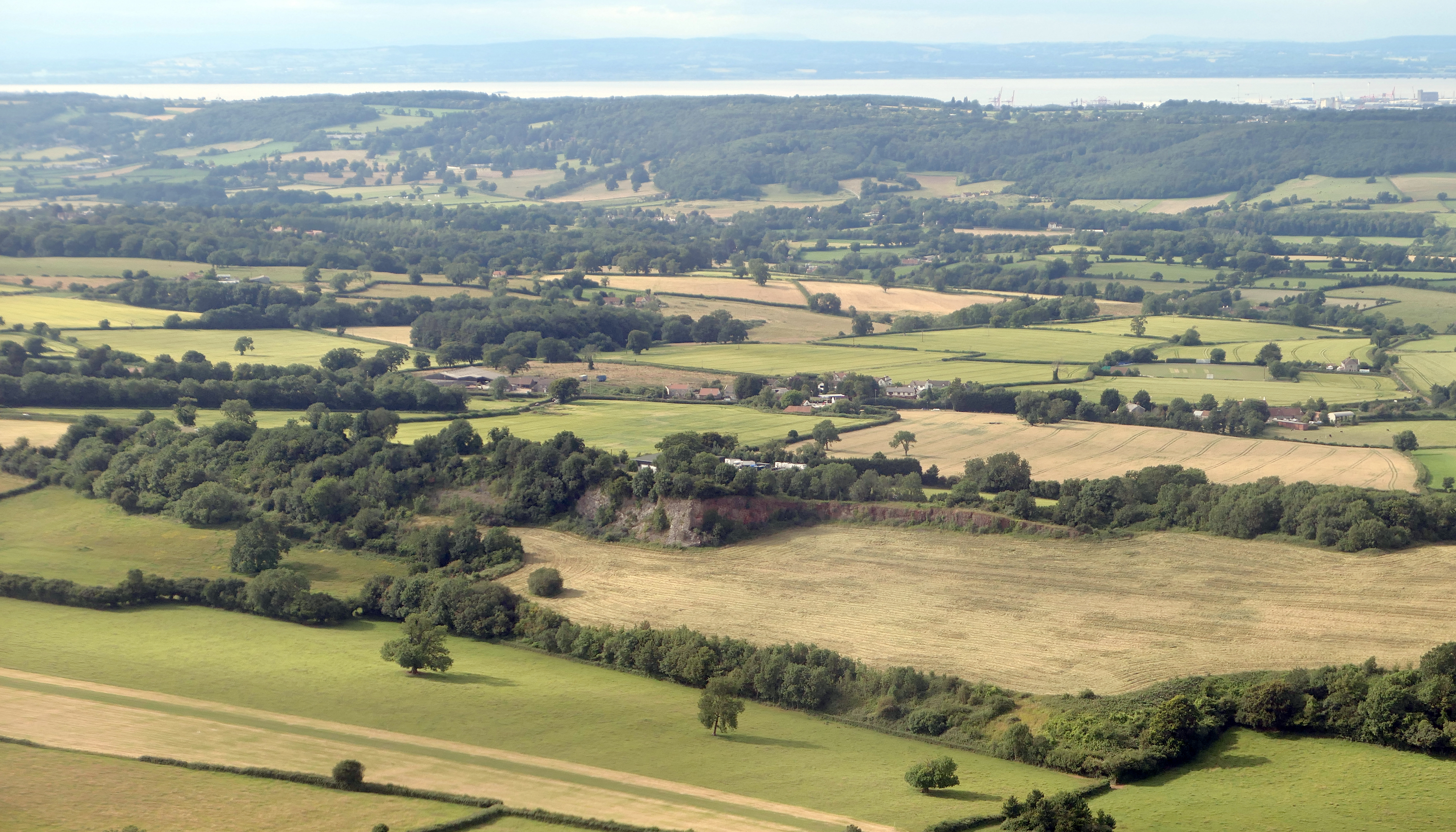
Aerial view of the site

Hartcliff Rocks Quarry (grid reference ST534662) is a 1.6 hectare (3.9 acre) Site of Special Scientific Interest (SSSI) near Felton, Somerset notified in 1991.

According to the citation, the site "provides exposures of Triassic Dolomitic Conglomerate unconformably overlying Carboniferous Limestone."
