= A432 road =

Road in England

A432

Major junctions
- From: Bristol
- A420 A4320 A4017 A4174; A46
- To: Old Sodbury

Location
- Country: United Kingdom
- Constituent country: England
- Primary destinations: Bristol; Yate

Road network
- Roads in the United Kingdom; Motorways; A and B road zones

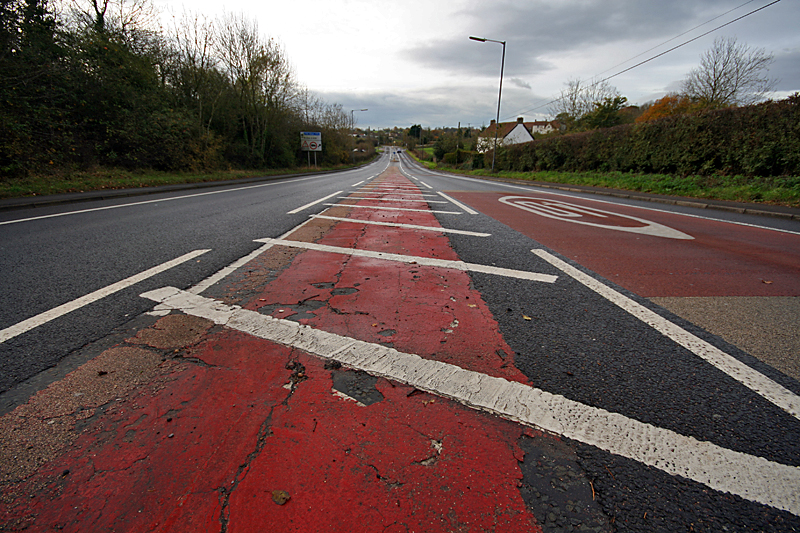
The A432 road just outside Coalpit Heath, South Gloucestershire

The A432 is a road running from Bristol to Old Sodbury. The road is mostly single carriageway with one lane each way, with a short dual carriageway section in the east of Yate.

== History ==
The A432 was originally classified in 1922 and the route has remained unchanged since. In 1966 the construction of the M4 required a bridge to be built, and a roundabout was built to connect the road to the A4174 in the early 90s. The section of dual carriageway was mostly 2 lanes each way in 1999, but over the next 20 years it was gradually downgraded to one lane each way.

The bridge carrying the A432 over the M4 was closed on 12 July 2023 to all motor vehicles after cracks were found in the structure. It was decided in December 2023 following further inspection of the bridge that repairs or strengthening will not solve the problems with the structure in the long-term and it will need to be fully replaced. The existing bridge will be demolished mid to late 2024 with the replacement not opening until at least late 2025.

== Route ==
The road starts near Lawrence Hill in Bristol on the A420 and heads North-East, where it intersects the A4320. It continues to Downend, passing Easton and Fishponds, where it has three junctions with the A4017 before heading north to a roundabout with the A4174. After the roundabout it goes north over the M4 and heads North-East to Yate, and once it reaches it the road splits into a dual carriageway until it gets to Chipping Sodbury. The road heads East out of Chipping Sodbury and continues that way until it terminates at the A46.

== See also ==
- British road numbering scheme
- A roads in Zone 4 of the Great Britain numbering scheme
