= Lulsgate Aerodrome =

Motor racing circuit in North Somerset

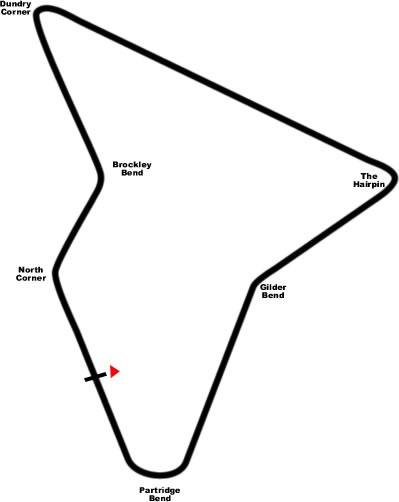
- The layout of Lulsgate Circuit in 1950
- Location: Bristol, England
- Coordinates: 51.3823°N 2.7123°W
- Opened: 1949
- Closed: 1950
- Major events: Formula III

1949 Circuit
- Length: 3.0 km (1.9 miles)

1950 Circuit
- Length: 3.4 km (2.1 miles)

Lulsgate Aerodrome was a motor racing circuit at the former RAF Lulsgate Bottom airfield, which in 1957 subsequently became Bristol Airport. The airfield was turned into a racing circuit in 1949. Lulsgate hosted two race meetings, in 1949 and 1950. The circuit mainly hosted sports car events, however a Formula III race featured in both 1949 and 1950.

== Circuit ==
The original track layout of Lulsgate Aerodrome was used in 1949. This layout was 1.9 miles (3.0 km) long. The circuit used the main runway and perimeter track of the airfield. The start/finish straight was located after the kink after North Corner on the runway. The layout of Lulsgate Aerodrome was changed for 1950. The circuit was lengthened to 2.1 miles (3.4 km). The new layout used more of the perimeter track of the airfield instead of the runways. This meant that the circuit featured a longer straight between Dundry Corner and The Hairpin (the only used on the circuit). The start/finish straight was also moved to between Partridge Bend and North corner.
