= Lulsgate Quarry =

Geological Site of Special Scientific Interest in Somerset, England

- Site of Special Scientific Interest
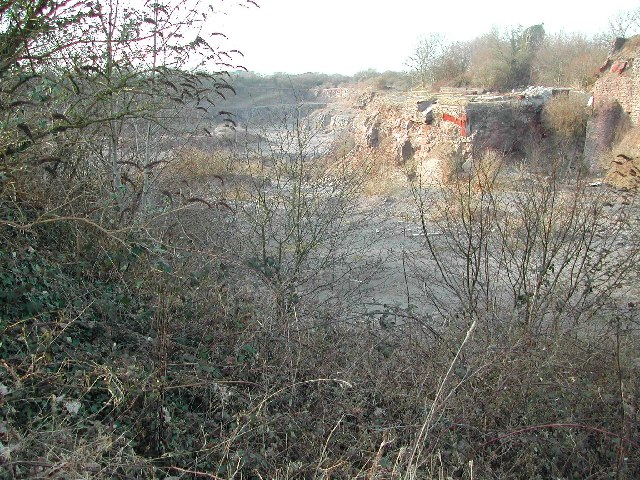

- Location within Somerset
- Location of Lulsgate Quarry.
- Area of search: Avon
- Grid reference: ST516659
- Coordinates: 51.39007°N 2.69698°W
- Interest: Geological
- Area: 1.13 hectares (2.8 acres)
- Notification date: 1997

Lulsgate Quarry (grid reference ST516659) is a 2¾ acre (1.13 hectare) geological Site of Special Scientific Interest near the village of Felton, North Somerset, notified in 1997.

The site has an excellent exposure of an irregular unconformity surface lying between inclined Lower Carboniferous (Dinantian) Black Rock limestones and flat-bedded Upper Triassic (Rhaetian) strata.
