= WESTlink (on-demand bus) =

Demand-responsive bus service in England

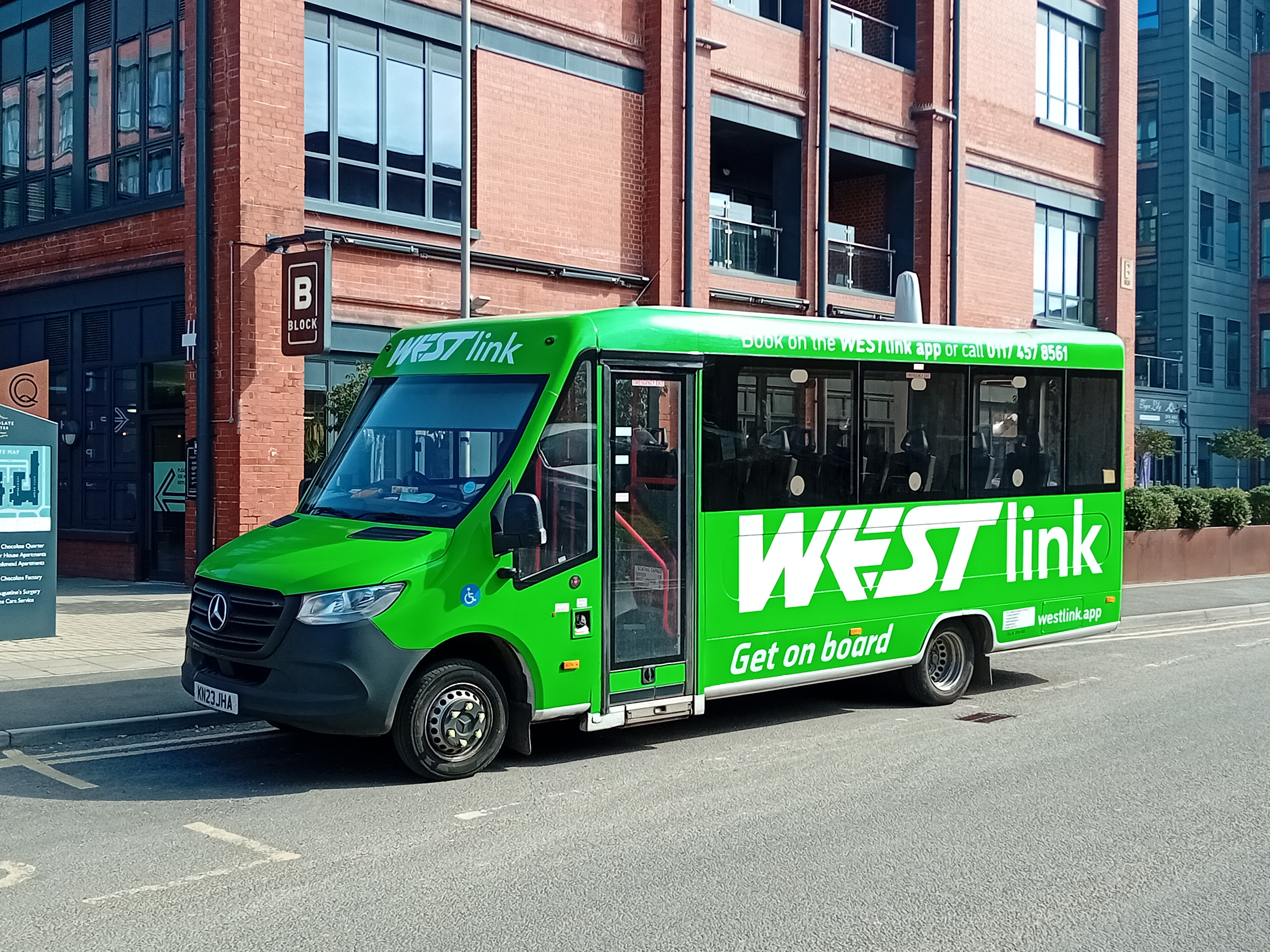
- WESTlink on-demand bus in Keynsham
- Parent: West of England Combined Authority
- Founded: April 2023
- Locale: Principal areas of: Bristol; Bath; Somerset including Bristol Airport; South Gloucestershire
- Service type: Demand-responsive bus services
- Website: travelwest.info/westlink

WESTlink is a demand-responsive bus service provided by the West of England Combined Authority in Bristol, Bath, South Gloucestershire and parts of Somerset.

Launched in April 2023, the service has replaced around 40 rural bus services.

WESTlink allows journeys to be booked at short notice via mobile app, website or phone call. The service may pick up and drop off multiple passengers en route, similar to ridesharing taxis. It operates between 07:00 and 19:00, Monday to Saturday, with reduced service on Sundays. A door-to-door service available for disabled passengers on request, and is fully wheelchair accessible.
