= Bristol Airport =

Airport in England

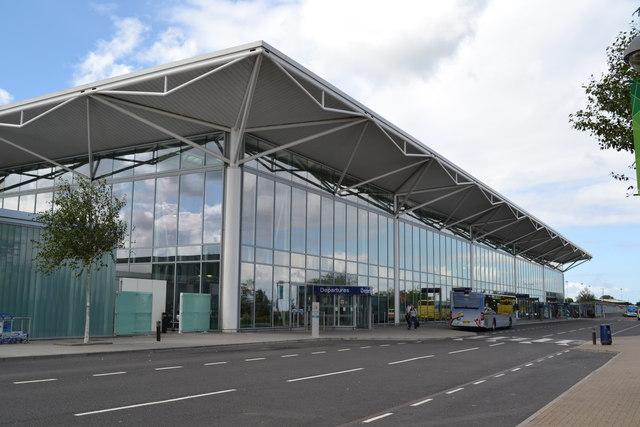
- IATA: BRS; ICAO: EGGD

Summary
- Airport type: Public
- Serves: Bristol and West of England
- Location: Lulsgate Bottom, North Somerset
- Focus city for: easyJet; Jet2.com; Ryanair; TUI Airways
- Elevation AMSL: 622 ft (190 m)
- Coordinates: 51°22′58″N 002°43′09″W
- Website: www.bristolairport.co.uk

Map
- Location in Somerset BRS (England) BRS (Europe)

Runways
Direction	Length		Surface
Direction	m	ft	Surface
09/27	2,011	6,598	Asphalt

Statistics (2024)
- Passengers: 10,479,112
- Passenger change 23-24: ▲7%
- Aircraft Movements: 78,554
- Movements change 23-24: ▲14.31%
- Sources: UK AIP at NATS; Statistics from the UK Civil Aviation Authority

Bristol Airport (IATA: BRS, ICAO: EGGD) is an international airport serving the city of Bristol, England, and the surrounding area. Located at Lulsgate Bottom, on the northern slopes of the Mendip Hills, in North Somerset, it is 8 miles (13 kilometres) southwest of Bristol city centre. Built on the site of a former RAF airfield, it opened in 1957 as Bristol (Lulsgate) Airport, replacing Bristol (Whitchurch) Airport as Bristol's municipal airport. From 1997 to 2010, it was known as Bristol International Airport. In 1997, a majority shareholding in the airport was sold to FirstGroup, and then in 2001 the airport was sold to a joint venture of Macquarie Bank and others. In September 2014, Ontario Teachers' Pension Plan bought out Macquarie to become the sole owner. In November 2025, Macquarie Asset Management purchased 55% of the shares, with the remainder held by Australia's New South Wales Treasury Corporation ("TCorp"), the Australian Retirement Trust (“ART”) and StepStone

In 2019, it was ranked the eighth busiest airport in the United Kingdom, handling over 8.9 million passengers, a 3% increase compared with 2018. In 2025, while maintaining its eighth position, it served 10.83 million passengers, accounting for 3.6% of all UK airport passengers.

A passenger survey carried out in 2015 found that 32.5% of journeys using the airport started or ended in the city of Bristol, 9.6% in Gloucestershire, 24.5% in Somerset, 16.9% in Devon and 8.2% in Wiltshire.

Airlines with operating bases at the airport include easyJet and Ryanair. The airport has a Civil Aviation Authority Public Use Aerodrome Licence (number P432) that allows flights for the public transport of passengers and for flying instruction.

== History ==
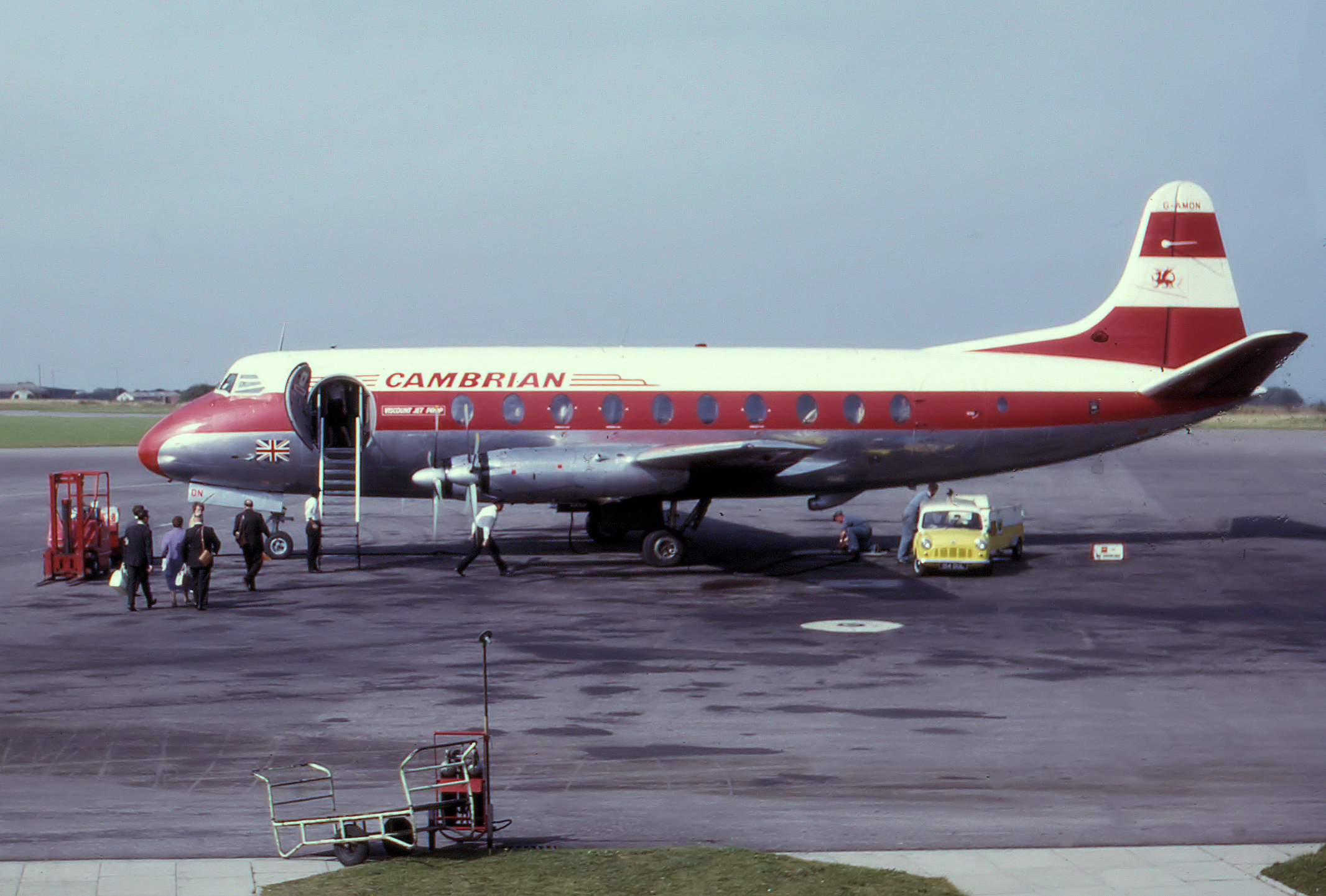
Cambrian Airways Vickers Viscount loads at the airport in 1963

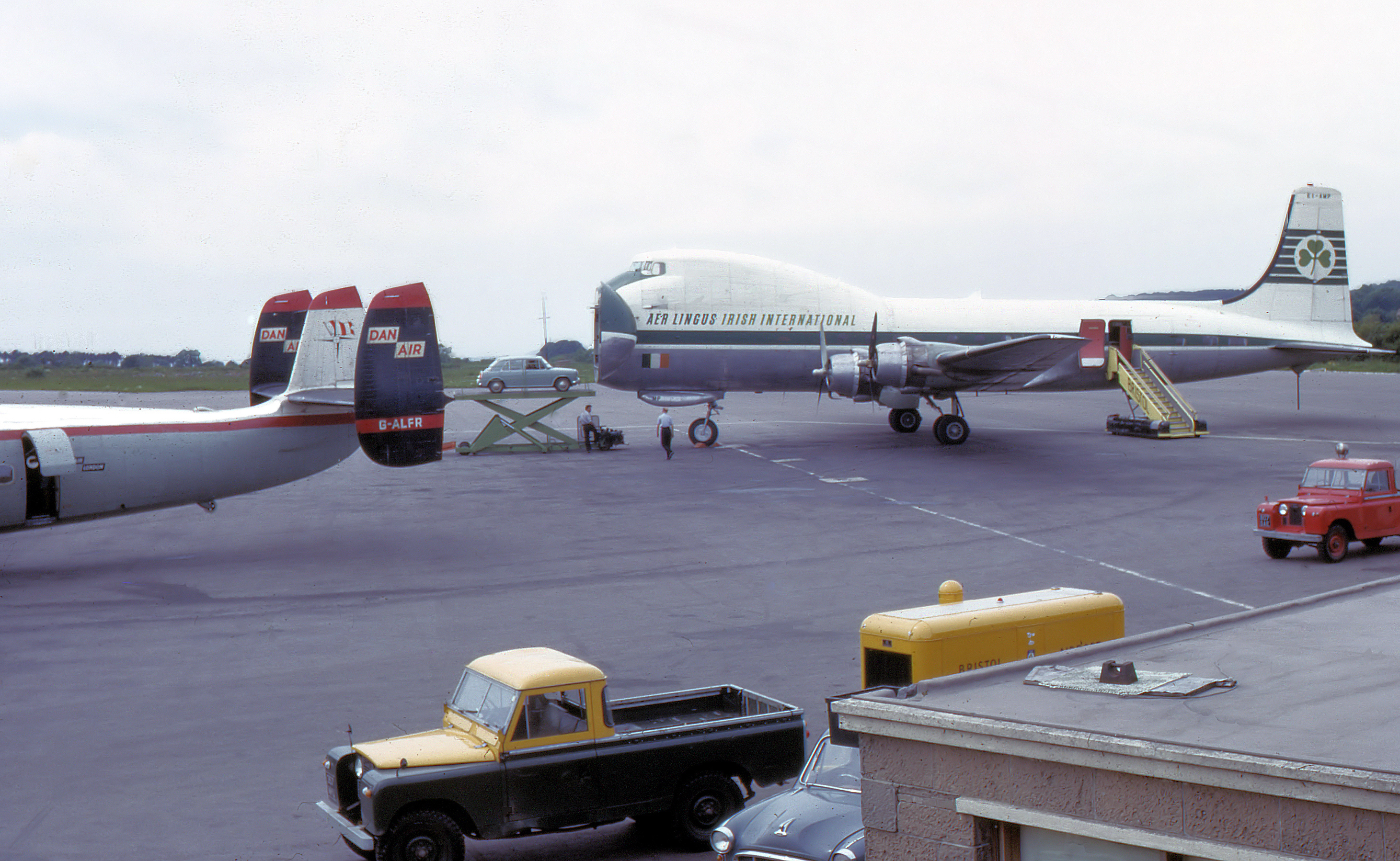
Aviation Traders Carvair and the tail of an Airspeed Ambassador in 1965

=== First airport ===
In 1927, a group of local businessmen raised £6,000 through public subscription to start the Bristol and Wessex Aeroplane Club, a flying club initially based at Filton Aerodrome. In 1929, Bristol Corporation took up the club's proposal to develop farmland located at Whitchurch, to the south of Bristol, into a municipal airport. On its opening by Prince George, Duke of Kent in 1930, Bristol (Whitchurch) Airport was the third civil airport in the United Kingdom. Passenger numbers grew to 4,000 by 1939.

During World War II, Whitchurch was the main civil airport remaining operational. The newly formed British Overseas Airways Corporation (BOAC) was transferred to Whitchurch from Croydon Airport and Heston Airport. BOAC operated routes around the British Empire and to neutral nations. The Bristol–Lisbon route (Portugal was a neutral nation and had both British and German planes flying there) was operated by the Dutch airline KLM, under charter to BOAC.

=== RAF Lulsgate Bottom ===
In September 1940, No. 10 Elementary Flying Training School RAF at RAF Weston-super-Mare established a Relief Landing Ground on 14 acres (5.7 ha) at Broadfield Down by the hamlet of Lulsgate Bottom, southwest of the city and north of Redhill village. Being high, at 600 ft (180 m), the site had a poor weather record during warm front conditions, when it was often covered in low cloud. However, when this occurred the alternative airfields at Filton and Cardiff were usually clear and operational; and as Lulsgate was clear when the low-lying airfields were obscured by radiation fog in calm weather, the landing ground provided a useful alternative. Few facilities were constructed although pillboxes, defensive anti-aircraft guns and later two Blister hangars were added. In late 1940, a Starfish site was set up south of the village of Downside and just west of the airfield. Its decoy fires attracted a large quantity of Luftwaffe high explosives and incendiaries on the nights of 16 March 3 and 4 April 1941 during the Bristol Blitz.

In 1941, RAF Fighter Command planned to use the airfield for an experimental unit, and after requisitioning land from several adjacent farms, contracted George Wimpey and Company to begin work on 11 June 1941. However, its intended use soon changed into being a satellite airfield for the fighter squadrons based at RAF Colerne. Originally, the new airfield's name was to be RAF Broadfield Down. The airfield used a standard-issue three-runway layout resembling an A shape. The main, east–west runway was 3,891 ft (1,186 m) long, with a designated alignment of 28/10, and the others were 3,281 ft (1,000 m) aligned 21/03 and 3,294 ft (1,004 m) aligned 34/16. The first aircraft to land was a Luftwaffe Ju 88 at 06.20 on 24 July 1941. Returning from a raid, its crew had been deceived by the RAF electronic countermeasures radio beacon at Lympsham, which was re-radiating the signal from a Luftwaffe homing beacon at Brest, France.

By 1942, there was no longer a need for an additional fighter airfield. With its name changed to RAF Lulsgate Bottom, the airfield was declared operational on 15 January 1942. The Miles Masters, Airspeed Oxfords and Hawker Hurricanes of No. 286 (AA Cooperation) Squadron became resident, with the role of providing realistic exercises for ground anti-aircraft defences. However, as the site lacked some basic facilities, No. 286 moved to RAF Zeals in May. From 1 June 1942, the airfield was under No. 23 Group of RAF Flying Training Command, and initially became a satellite airfield for No. 3 (Pilot) Advanced Flying Unit (3 (P)AFU), based at RAF South Cerney, flying Oxfords. In March 1943, No. 1540 Beam Approach Training Flight RAF (1540 BATF) was formed at Lulsgate, again flying Oxfords. On 27 September 1943, 3 (P)AFU left Lulsgate for RAF Southrop, and was replaced on 1 October 1943 by No. 3 Flying Instructors School (3 FIS), which was previously headquartered at RAF Hullavington. 3 FIS flew mostly Oxfords and some Masters.

In 1944, BOAC started to use the airfield for Douglas Dakota and Consolidated Liberator crew training, and BOAC flights made use of it occasionally as an alternate airfield for Whitchurch, and for topping-up fuel on the Bristol–Lisbon route.

On 6 February 1945, 1540 BATF left for RAF Weston Zoyland. On 18 July 1945, 3 FIS was absorbed into 7 FIS. With the war over, the RAF ceased training at Lulsgate on 15 April 1946, and the next month 7 FIS left the airfield and joined the Central Flying School at RAF Little Rissington. The RAF finally abandoned Lulsgate on 25 October 1946.

=== Lulsgate Bottom Airfield ===
From 1948, the site was the home of the Bristol Gliding Club. In 1949 and 1950, the Bristol Motor Cycle and Light Car Club hosted motor races on a 2 mi (3.2 km) circuit known as Lulsgate Aerodrome, but due to planning and noise issues moved in 1950 to a site that became known as Castle Combe Circuit.

=== Bristol (Lulsgate) Airport ===
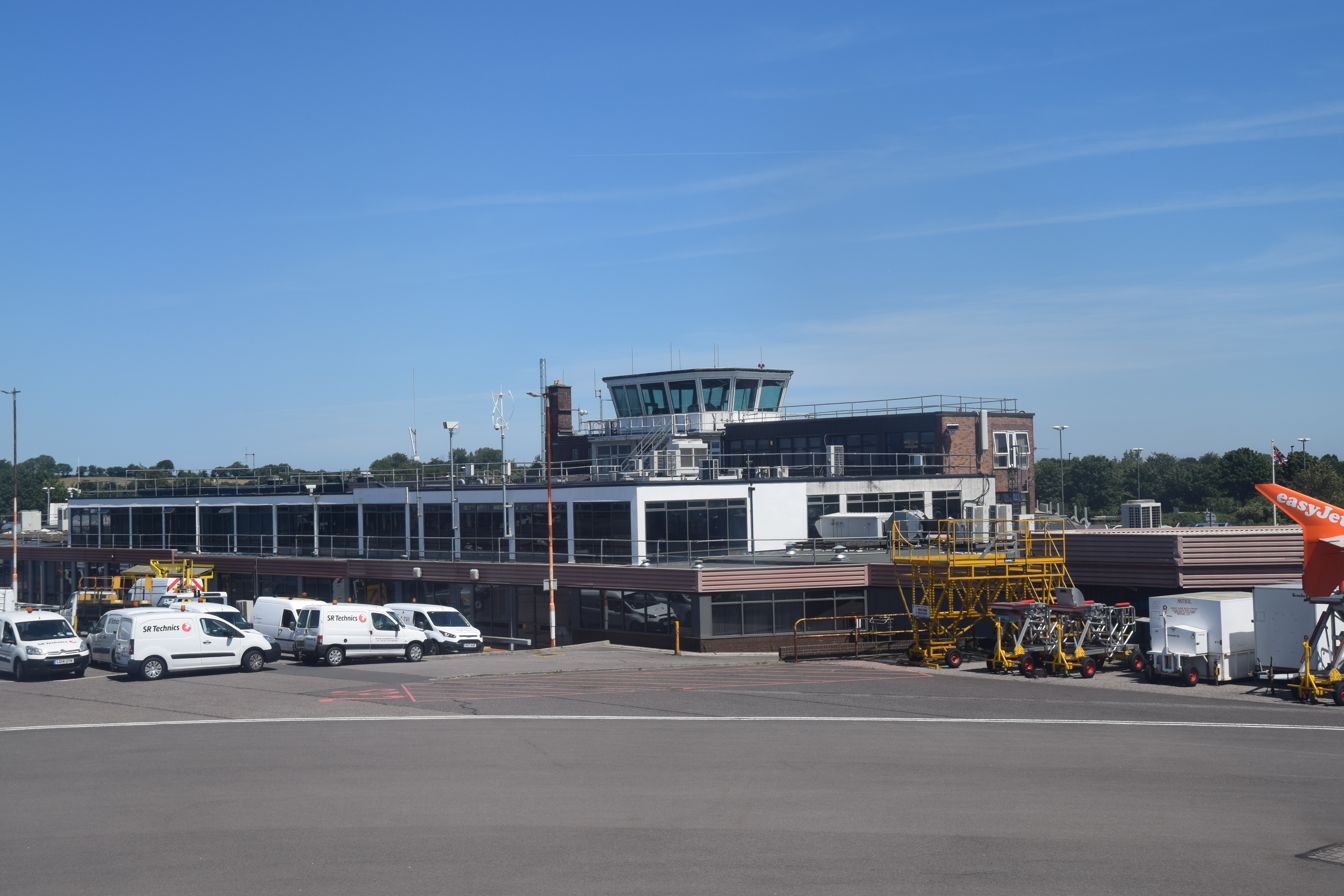
The former terminal building for Bristol (Lulsgate) Airport

Whitchurch airport continued to be used after World War II, but the introduction of heavier post-war airliners made a runway extension highly desirable. However, this was difficult at Whitchurch, because of the nearby housing estates. In June 1955, the Minister of Transport and Civil Aviation agreed to sell the Lulsgate airfield to Bristol Corporation, for the development of a new airport there. Bristol Gliding Club moved out to Nympsfield in Gloucestershire.

In addition to the purchase price of £55,000, the city spent a further £200,000 by 1958 on building the terminal, built to the design of City Architect J. Nelson Meredith, and other development. In mid-April 1957, all air traffic was transferred from Whitchurch to the new airport. With the name of Bristol (Lulsgate) Airport, it was officially opened on 1 May 1957 by Princess Marina, Duchess of Kent. In the airport's first year it was used by 33,000 people. Bristol and Wessex Aeroplane Club also moved to Lulsgate.

In 1962, a new control tower was built, and in 1969 the runway was lengthened and extensions were made to the terminal. In 1968 a new 5,000 sq ft (460 m^{2}) cargo transit shed was constructed. In 1974, the airline Court Line collapsed, causing a fall in passenger numbers.

By 1980, although 17 charter airlines were operating from the airport, it was making a loss. Les Wilson took over as managing director in that year, a position which he held until his death in a car crash in November 1995; much of the airport's subsequent strong recovery over that period has been attributed to him. The airport moved back into profit in financial year 1981/82, and by 1983/84 the profit was £0.5 million. In 1984, an international departure lounge was added, with duty-free shops and a 24-hour air-side bar.

The Airports Act 1986 required every municipal airport with a turnover greater than £1 million to be turned into a public limited company. On 1 April 1987, Bristol City Council transferred the operation and net assets of the airport to Bristol Airport plc. The council retained full ownership of the company. However, under the terms of the Act, as long as the local authority retained a majority shareholding there were restrictions on the ability of the company to raise finance for capital projects.

In 1988, the airport opened a new concourse area. In 1994, a planning application for a new terminal was approved. With other projects also planned, the council decided to sell a majority shareholding in the airport, so that the restrictions imposed by the Airports Act on raising the necessary finance could be removed.

=== Bristol International Airport ===
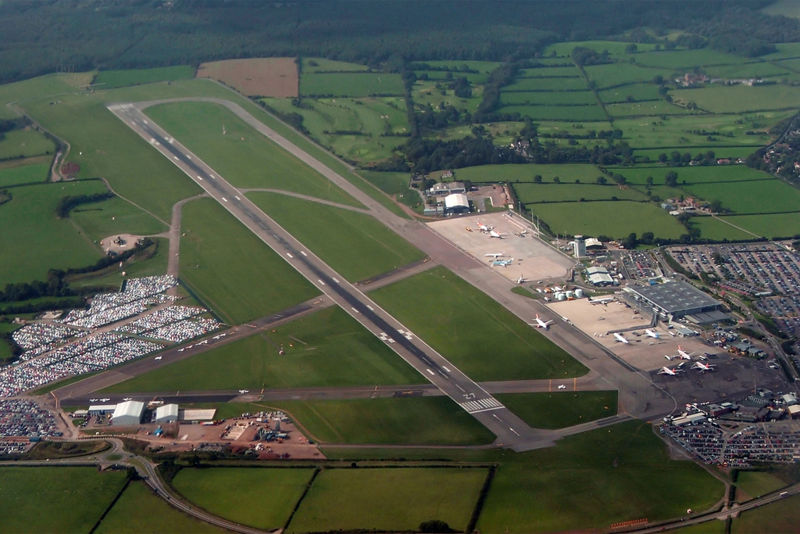
Aerial view

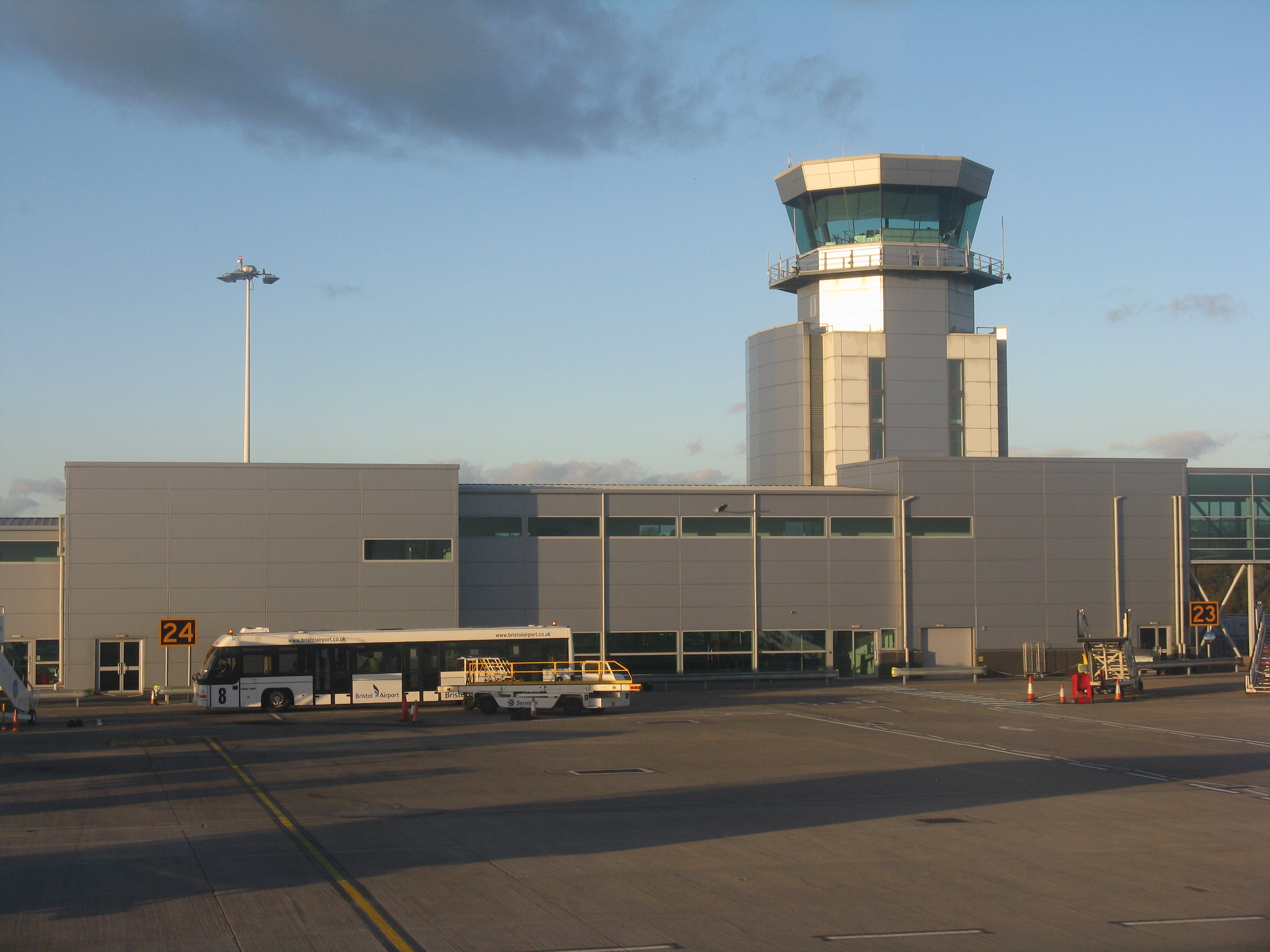
Air traffic control tower

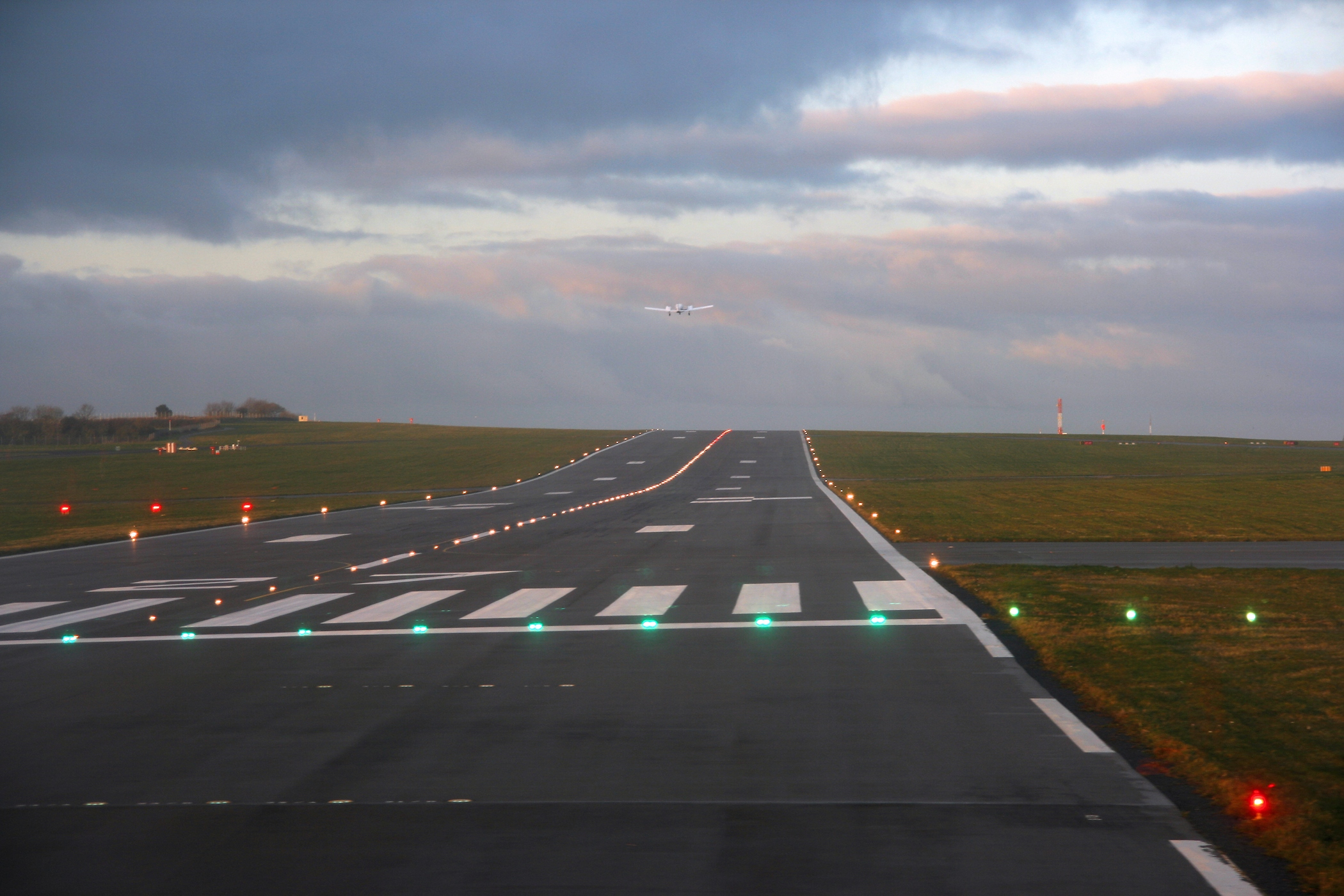
Runway view

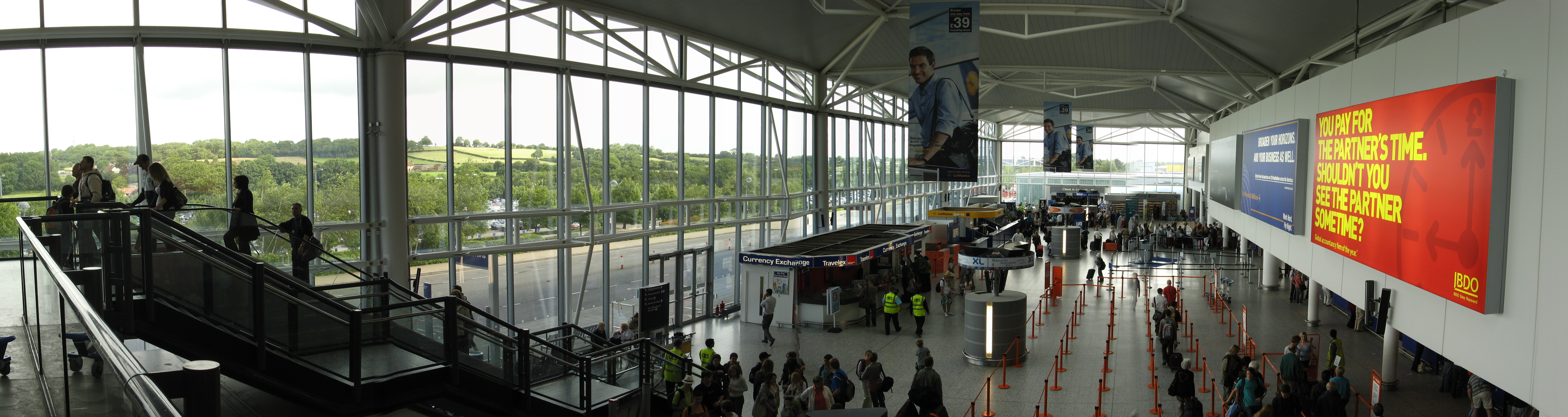
Terminal interior

In mid-1997, the airport's name was changed to Bristol International Airport. In November 1997, the successful bidder for the purchase of a 51% stake in the airport company was revealed to be FirstBus. The remaining 49% was retained by the council. Work on the new terminal building had already started; it opened in March 2000, at a cost of £27 million. In 2000, passenger numbers exceeded two million for the first time. A new control tower was built and the A38 road was diverted to cater for the installation of a Category 3 instrument landing system; these projects were completed in 2001.

In January 2001, the airport was purchased for £198 million, by a joint venture of Macquarie Bank and Cintra, part of the Ferrovial group. Ferrovial sold its 50% share to Macquarie in 2006. The Ontario Teachers' Pension Plan made two substantial share purchases, in 2002 and 2009.

In May 2001, the low-cost carrier Go Fly made Bristol Airport its second base after Stansted. Passenger numbers passed through three million in 2002, largely due to Go's arrival. easyJet purchased Go in 2002, took over the base in 2003 and continued its rapid growth in destinations. In May 2005, Continental Airlines introduced a direct flight from Bristol to Newark with Boeing 757 aircraft, though this ceased in November 2010.

A new asphalt runway surface was laid between November 2006 and March 2007, at a cost of £17 million. Within this period, on 29 December and 3 January, there were four incidents of reduced braking action in wet conditions on the temporary surface, including two in which aircraft left the runway. From 5 January, ten airlines, led by easyJet, cancelled or diverted their Bristol flights. The airport closed the runway on 7 January to cut grooves into the surface to improve water runoff, and flights resumed the next day.

Ryanair established a base at the airport in 2007. In 2008, passenger numbers reached six million.

=== Bristol Airport ===
In March 2010, the airport was rebranded as Bristol Airport. The airport gained a new logo, said by the airport's owners to represent 'people', 'place' and 'region'; and a new slogan, "Amazing journeys start here".

Bristol Airport does not operate any jetways, so aircraft have to park on the apron and passengers either walk out to their flights or are carried by bus. May 2010 saw the opening of a 450 m (1,480 ft) walkway to the west of the terminal building, connecting it to eight new pre-boarding zones, at a cost of £8 million, to reduce the need for buses. In 2012, BMI Regional established a base at the airport. In 2013, the airline added routes to German and Italian hub airports, aimed at business travellers.

In September 2014, Toronto-based Ontario Teachers' Pension Plan agreed to buy Macquarie's remaining 50% stake in the airport, thereby gaining 100% ownership. In July 2020, over 76 employee redundancies, up to a quarter of the work force, were announced by Bristol Airport. The job losses were announced despite the government's Job Retention Scheme.

On 11 November 2020, Jet2.com and Jet2holidays announced that they would open their tenth UK base at Bristol Airport on 1 April 2021, operating to 33 destinations; however, as a result of the ongoing coronavirus travel restrictions, the base opening and flights were delayed until 1 July 2021. In May 2023, it was announced that TUI Airways would discontinue their long-haul routes to Melbourne, Florida, and Cancún, Mexico. The two routes ceased at the end of summer 2023, this left the airport with no transatlantic routes.

== Expansion ==
=== Initial development plans ===
In response to the UK government's 2003 white paper The Future of Air Transport, the airport published a Master Plan for expansion over the period 2006–2030.

In October 2007, the airport announced that it would delay the planning application until the middle of 2008 to give it time to complete research on the airport's effect on the environment. The World Development Movement claimed that flights from the airport generated the same amount of carbon dioxide as the nation of Malawi.

A campaign against the plan was led by Stop Bristol Airport Expansion, supported by Bristol Friends of the Earth and the Campaign to Protect Rural England.

==== Approval and staging ====
The application was eventually submitted in 2009. The £150m plan, designed to facilitate growth in annual passenger numbers to 10 million, was approved by North Somerset Council in 2010 and by the Secretary of State for Communities and Local Government later the same year.

In October 2011, Stop Bristol Airport Expansion lost its legal challenge to the plan.

The expansion was to occur in stages, spread over 30 construction projects. Plans included a doubling of passenger terminal floorspace, new piers and aircraft parking stands, extensions to the apron, multi-storey car parking and a public transport interchange.

==== Construction ====
The first project was completed in June 2012, with the opening of three new aircraft stands.

In July 2014, a 3,880 m^{2} (41,800 sq ft), £6.5m walkway connected to the centre of the terminal was opened, providing four more pre-boarding zones including ones for wide-body aircraft such as the Boeing 787 Dreamliner.

In July 2015, the airport opened an £8.6m eastward extension of the terminal, with a larger departure lounge and an outdoor terrace. Construction of another terminal extension started immediately, to the west and costing £24m. The first phases of the 9,000-square-metre (97,000 sq ft) western extension, which opened in summer 2016, provided a new security search area for departures, with 12 security lanes including a fast track zone. New arrivals facilities within the extension, including baggage reclaim and customs, were scheduled to open later in 2016. In October 2016, the airport announced that a further project, an enlargement of the immigration hall, will complete in 2017. These were completed and opened to the public in April 2017, enabling an increase in the number of passport control points from 10 to 17, of which 10 are ePassport gates.

Work on a £9.5m multi-storey car park began in November 2017, following a £2.5m upgrade to the customer reception centre in the silver zone car park. The new car park opened in May 2018.

=== Hotel ===
A planning application for an on-site 251-room hotel was approved separately in 2010. In February 2014, a planning application was submitted for a revision to the previously approved design, with a 201-room hotel to be built initially, followed later by a 50-room addition. The airport stated that among the UK's busiest 16 airports, only Bristol lacked an on-site hotel. In February 2015, the airport announced that the 201-room hotel would be completed in 2016, and will be operated as a Hampton by Hilton. It opened for bookings in January 2017. It was funded, built and is owned, by a Chinese company, CIMC Modular Building Systems, who shipped prefabricated modules for its construction from China.

=== 2018 expansion proposal ===
In 2018 the airport applied to extend the airport to allow a growth in passenger numbers to 12 million. The plan involved enlarging the passenger terminus and plane taxiways. It also planned to add parking for 3,000 more cars, much of it on greenbelt land. There was much resistance to the plan with 84% of North Somerset residents who commented rejecting the expansion plan. Bristol Airport Action Network (BAAN), a network of organisations including Extinction Rebellion, North Somerset Parishes, Stop Airport Expansion, Friends of the Earth, and Greenpeace organised a huge resistance. This culminated in North Somerset council voting 18 to 7 to reject the plan on 10 February 2020. It said the detrimental effect on the area and the wider impact on the environment outweighed the narrower benefits to airport expansion.

==== Appeal ====
The airport appealed, and a four-week public inquiry started in July 2021. The Planning Inspectorate granted the appeal in February 2022. Bristol Airport Action Network applied for a statutory appeal, which was held in the High Court in Bristol in November 2022.

In January 2023 the appeal in the High Court was dismissed. Sarah Warren, a cabinet member of Bath and North East Somerset Council, said it was a "deeply disappointing result". In May 2023, the Court of Appeal dismissed an application to hear an appeal against the airport's expansion plan from the Bristol Airport Action Network. This was the final possible legal challenge.

==== Transport hub ====
In September 2023 Bristol Airport announced the commencement of its new expansion plans, starting with the construction of a £60m transport hub and car park. This project includes the creation of one of the region's largest bus interchanges on the top level of the new car park, with an expansion that will more than double the number of coach bays, increasing them from 6 to 16. Additionally, the new multi-storey car park will provide over 2,000 parking spaces. The project was expected to take 18 months and aims to significantly enhance transportation options and services for passengers arriving at or departing from the airport.

In July 2025, the new public transport interchange officially opened, significantly boosting bus and coach capacity and service frequency.

=== 2024 expansion proposal ===
In November 2024, the airport opened a consultation on another capacity increase, to 15 million passengers per year, including launching direct long-haul flights to destinations such as the Middle East and the east coast of America. The proposal involves extending the Bristol Airport terminal from approximately 50,000 m^{2} (540,000 sq ft) to 130,000 m^{2} (1,400,000 sq ft), beyond the existing permission to expand to 70,000 m^{2} (750,000 sq ft).

The plans include a 150 m (490 ft) runway extension within existing boundaries to support limited long-haul routes, alongside new taxiways to reduce congestion. To address traffic impacts, plans involve upgrading the A38 and nearby junctions, introducing bus priority lanes, and collaborating on future mass transit connections.

In November 2025, as part of the preparations for the proposed runway changes, the airport initiated a public consultation regarding the development of new runway approach lighting systems, essential for the safe operation of extended and long-haul routes.

The airport continued its terminal investment under existing permissions in December 2025, announcing a transformation of its departure lounge, which will feature a larger central bar, a new food and beverage area, and significantly more seating for passengers.

=== Views for and against expansion ===
The Bristol Airport Action Network criticised expansion proposals, calling them disappointing and stating that they fail to "consider the needs of local people" or address "its climate impact." They also described the airport's projected economic and job benefits as "misleading," citing their research, which indicates that the airport often "massively overstates the number of new jobs and economic gains it will generate."

Steve Smith, the Conservative candidate for the Mayor of the West of England, expressed his support for the expansion proposal. He argued that the expansion would "create local jobs, open new routes to the rest of the world, and attract greater inward investment to our region." Smith also emphasized the convenience and environmental benefits for local travellers, stating, "Too many local people have to endure long drives to Heathrow or Birmingham just to access the flights they need. This is inconvenient, inefficient, and not good for the environment. Expanding Bristol Airport will provide passengers with convenience, choice, and high-quality services, right here in the West of England."

== Facilities ==
Bristol Airport has one runway designated 09/27. As the prevailing wind is from the southwest, runway 27 (the westerly direction) is used about 70% of the time. The airport has one of the shortest international airport runways in the country at 2,011 m (6,598 ft) in length, with runway 27 having a threshold displacement of 140 metres (460 ft). Despite the short runway length, the airfield is able to accommodate aircraft as large as the Boeing 787 Dreamliner and Airbus A330.

== Airlines and destinations ==
The following airlines operate scheduled flights to and from Bristol:

Airlines	Destinations
Aer Lingus	Cork, Dublin
Aurigny	Guernsey
Discover	Seasonal: Frankfurt (begins 17 May 2027)
easyJet	Agadir, Alicante, Almería, Amsterdam, Antalya, Athens, Barcelona, Basel/Mulhouse, Belfast–City, Belfast–International, Berlin, Bilbao, Bordeaux, Copenhagen, Edinburgh, Enfidha, Faro, Fuerteventura, Funchal, Geneva, Gibraltar, Glasgow, Gran Canaria, Hurghada, Inverness, Isle of Man, Kraków, Lanzarote, Larnaca, Lisbon, Madrid, Málaga, Marrakesh, Milan–Malpensa, Munich, Murcia, Newcastle upon Tyne, Nice, Palma de Mallorca, Paphos, Paris–Charles de Gaulle, Pisa, Porto, Prague, Rome–Fiumicino, Sal, Seville, Sharm El Sheikh, Tenerife–South, Toulouse, Verona, Venice, Zurich; Seasonal: Bari, Bodrum, Burgas (begins 28 May 2027), Catania, Chania, Corfu, Dalaman, Dubrovnik, Grenoble, Heraklion, Ibiza, Innsbruck, Kos, La Rochelle, Lyon, Malta, Marseille, Menorca, Montpellier (begins 1 July 2027), Naples, Olbia, Palermo, Preveza/Lefkada, Pula, Reus, Reykjavík–Keflavík, Rhodes, Rovaniemi, Salzburg, Santorini, Skiathos, Split, Thessaloniki, Tivat, Tromsø, Turin, Vienna, Zante
Edelweiss Air	Seasonal: Zurich
Jet2.com	Agadir, Alicante, Antalya, Faro, Fuerteventura, Funchal, Gran Canaria, Lanzarote, Málaga, Malta, Palma de Mallorca, Paphos, Tenerife–South; Seasonal: Almería, Berlin (begins 26 November 2026), Bodrum, Bergerac (begins 22 May 2027), Burgas, Chania, Chambéry, Cologne/Bonn (begins 27 November 2026), Corfu, Dalaman, Geneva, Girona, Heraklion, Ibiza, Izmir, Jersey (begins 14 May 2027), Kalamata, Kefalonia, Kos, Larnaca, Menorca, Prague (begins 27 November 2026), Preveza/Lefkada, Reus, Reykjavík–Keflavík, Rhodes, Skiathos, Thessaloniki, Verona, Vienna (resumes 19 November 2026), Zante
KLM	Amsterdam
Loganair	Aberdeen, Jersey
Pegasus Airlines	Istanbul–Sabiha Gökçen
Ryanair	Alicante, Barcelona, Bari, Bucharest–Otopeni, Budapest, Bydgoszcz, Copenhagen, Dublin, Faro, Gran Canaria, Kaunas, Kraków, Lanzarote, Madrid, Málaga, Milan-Bergamo, Porto, Poznań, Rzeszów, Sofia, Tenerife–South, Toulouse, Venice, Wrocław; Seasonal: Bergerac, Béziers, Fuerteventura, Gdańsk, Girona, Grenoble, Ibiza, Knock, Limoges, Marseille, Palma de Mallorca, Prague, Turin, Rovaniemi, Valencia
SunExpress	Antalya
TUI Airways	Fuerteventura, Gran Canaria, Hurghada, Lanzarote, Sal, Sharm El Sheikh, Tenerife–South; Seasonal: Antalya, Burgas, Chambéry, Corfu, Dalaman, Dubrovnik, Enfidha, Geneva, Heraklion, Ibiza, Innsbruck, Kefalonia, Kittilä, Kos, Larnaca, Málaga, Marrakesh, Menorca, Palma de Mallorca, Paphos, Reus, Rhodes, Rovaniemi, Salzburg, Skiathos, Thessaloniki, Toulouse, Turin, Verona, Zakynthos

== Statistics ==
=== Passengers and movements ===
	Passengers (Note: Number of passengers including domestic, international and transit.)	Aircraft movements (Note: Number of movements represents total takeoffs and landings during that year.)
1997	1,614,837	59,547
1998	1,838,219	61,582
1999	1,993,331	62,072
2000	2,141,525	63,252
2001	2,694,464	69,854
2002	3,445,945	72,152
2003	3,915,072	74,635
2004	4,647,266	77,956
2005	5,253,752	84,289
2006	5,757,963	84,583
2007	5,926,774	76,428
2008	6,267,114	76,517
2009	5,642,921	70,245
2010	5,747,604	69,134
2011	5,780,746	66,179
2012	5,921,530	61,206
2013	6,131,896	65,299
2014	6,339,805	64,230
2015	6,786,790	68,074
2016	7,610,780	73,536
2017	8,239,250	76,199
2018	8,699,529	72,927
2019	8,964,242	69,434
2020	2,194,524	29,191
2021	2,087,772	32,278
2022	7,948,941	56,391
2023	9,911,879	68,718
2024	10,479,112	78,554
2025	10,833,730	78,084
Source: CAA Statistics

=== Busiest routes ===
Busiest international routes from Bristol (2024)
Rank	Destination	Passengers	Change 2023 to 2024
1	Amsterdam	502,440	▲6%
2	Alicante	487,980	▲5.2%
3	Palma de Mallorca	482,455	▲12.5%
4	Dublin	434,444	▲8.4%
5	Tenerife-South	421,952	▲13.2%
6	Málaga	396,867	▲0.6%
7	Faro	380,930	▲8%
8	Barcelona	274,641	▲0.8%
9	Lanzarote	267,220	▲7.7%
10	Paris-Charles de Gaulle	266,556	▲25%
Source: CAA Statistics

Busiest domestic routes from Bristol (2024)
Rank	Destination	Passengers	Change 2023 to 2024
1	Edinburgh	451,404	▲6.8%
2	Glasgow	292,113	▼1.3%
3	Belfast International	267,648	▼1.7%
4	Newcastle	147,923	▲3.3%
5	Inverness	92,198	▲10.1%
6	Belfast City	49,316	▲12.8%
7	Jersey	31,140	▼13.3%
8	Guernsey	25,818	▲0.3%
9	Isle of Man	21,040	▼22.8%
10	Aberdeen	14,360	▼11.5%
Source: CAA Statistics

== Ground transport ==
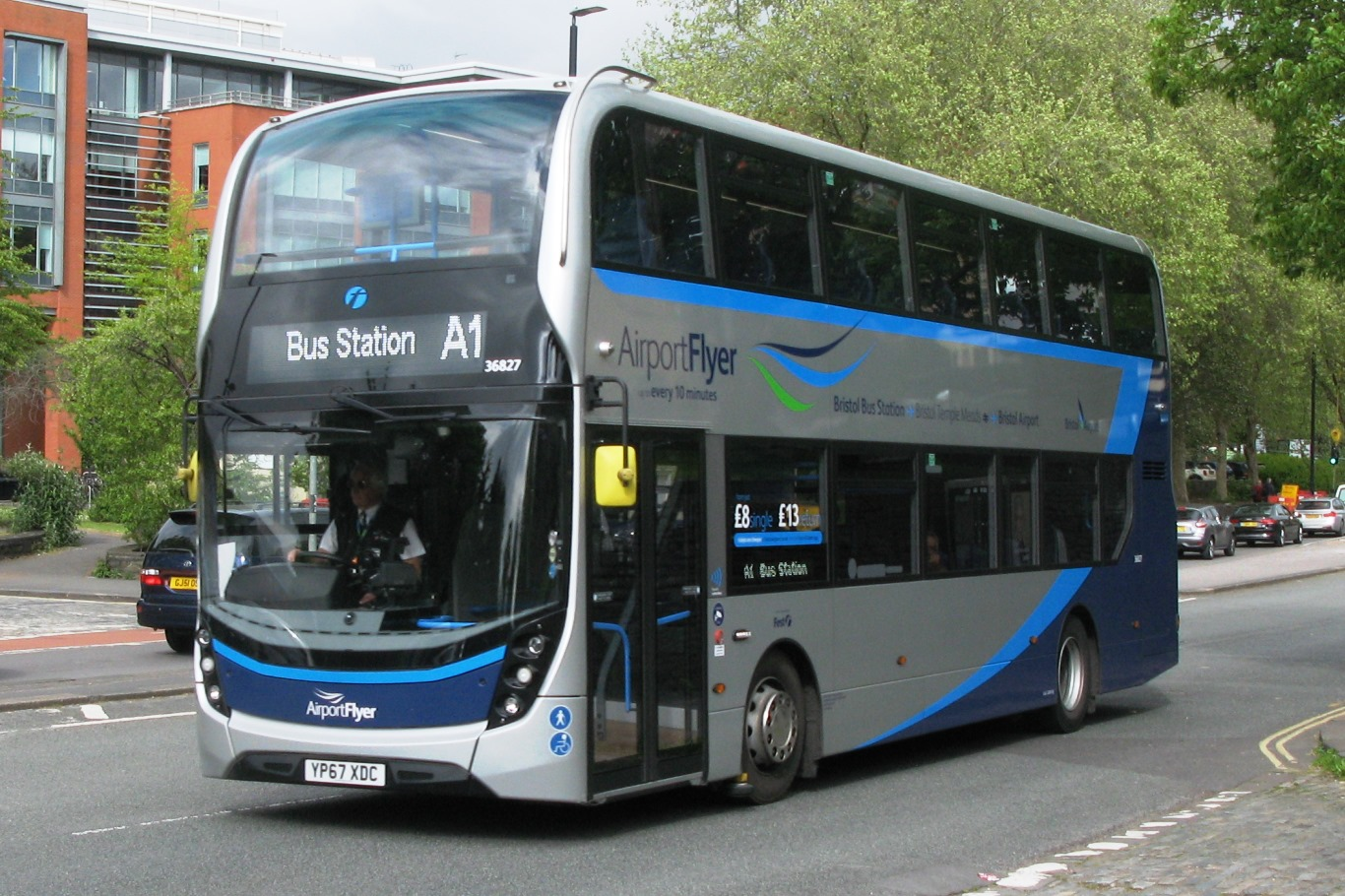
A Bristol Airport Flyer Alexander Dennis Enviro400 MMC bus in 2019

=== Road ===
Bristol Airport is located on the A38, 8 miles (13 km) southwest of Bristol city centre. The airport is signposted from the M5 motorway, from junction 22 when approaching from the south and junction 18 when approaching from the north. Neither gives quick access to the airport, a fact which was recognised by the Greater Bristol Strategic Transport Study. In November 2013, Bristol and North Somerset councils approved a planning application for the South Bristol Link Road, which provides a link from the A38 northwards to the A370 at Long Ashton, giving the airport an improved connection to the M5, and a link from the A38 southwards to Hengrove Park, connecting to the Bristol Ring Road.

=== Bus and Coach services ===
First West of England operates four Airport Flyer services to Bristol, Portishead, Weston-super-Mare and Bath. The A1 and A3 services run a limited stop service to Bristol and Weston-super-Mare respectively, where the A2 and A4 runs an 'all stops' service to Portishead and Bath respectively.

The WESTlink on-demand bus also serves the airport.

The South West Falcon, operated by Stagecoach South West runs between Bristol Cabot Circus and Plymouth, via the airport, Churchill, Brent Knoll, Bridgwater, Taunton and Exeter.

National Express and Flixbus also serve the airport, operating services to Birmingham, Cardiff, London, Nottingham, Penzance, Plymouth and Swansea.

In September 2023, as part of the airport's expansion plans, construction started on a £60 million multi-storey car park which includes one of the region's largest bus interchanges on its roof, it increased the number of bus and coach bays from six to 16. A new bridge connects the bus interchange to the terminal building. In July 2025, the new public transport interchange opened.

=== Proposed mass transit link ===
In July 2016, the airport's chief executive officer Robert Sinclair discussed the possibility of a rail link to the airport. The West of England LEP subsequently announced their application to the Department for Transport's Large Local Major Transport Schemes fund for the "South West Bristol Economic Link" – a strategy designed to address "poor connectivity between North Somerset, Bristol Airport and Bristol", which includes new road links as well as light or heavy rail opportunities. By 2019, this proposal had been expanded as a mass transit line with potential for underground sections.

In February 2026, the West of England Combined Authority published a new Transport Vision setting out a regional ambition to begin building a mass transit system in Bristol within four to five years. The document noted that Bristol Airport is currently the only regional airport in the country without a fixed mass transit connection, and included early concept images depicting a mass transit vehicle serving the airport.

== General aviation ==
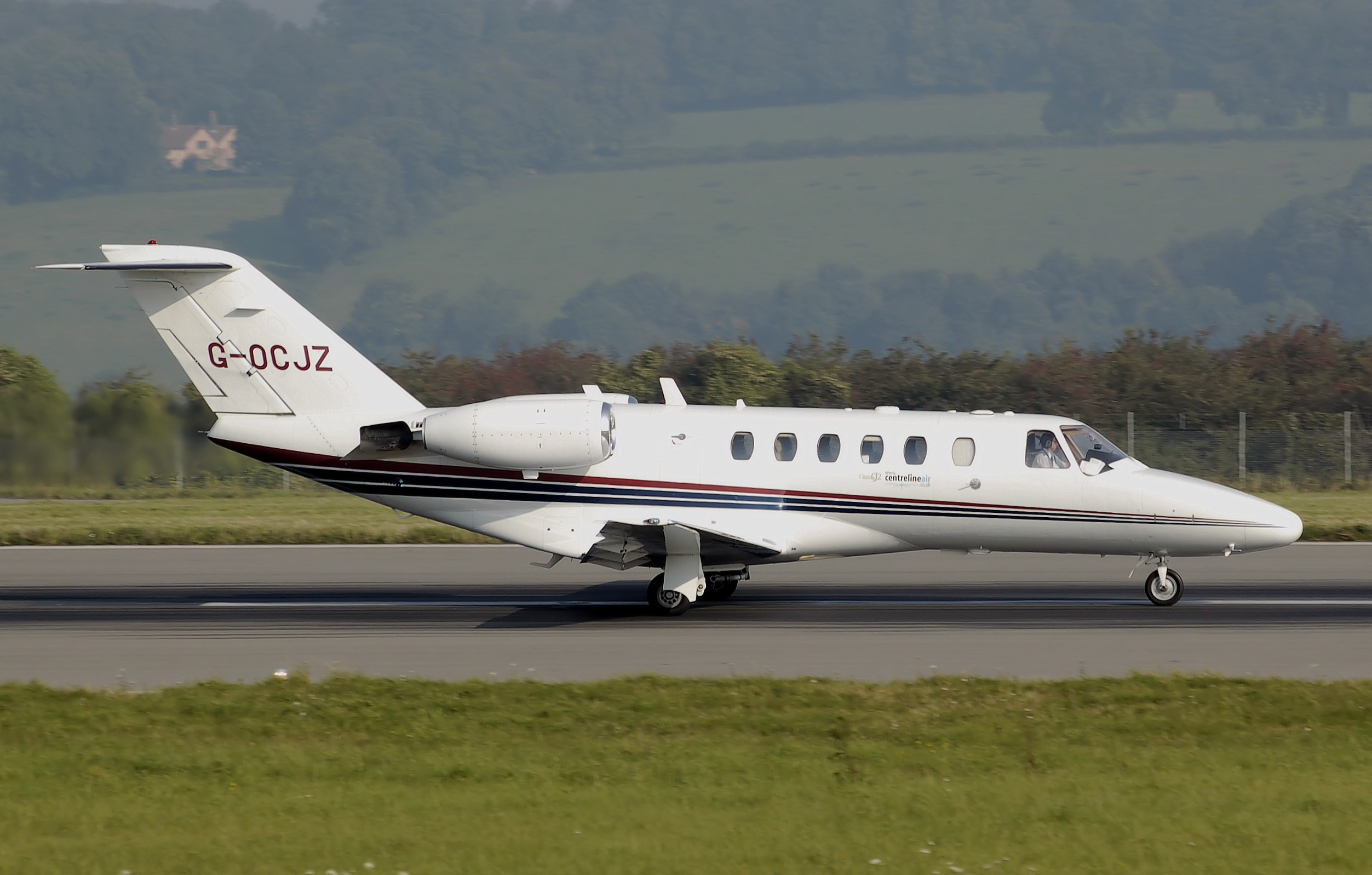
Centreline Air Charter Cessna Citation CJ2 taking off at Bristol Airport.

Bristol Airport is a general aviation (GA) centre. In 2006, the GA terminal was relocated from the north side next to the control tower to a purpose-built facility on the south east corner of the field. Handling for visiting executive GA aircraft is managed by Bristol Flying Centre, which also provides engineering services and operates a fleet of business jets trading as Centreline Air Charter. Handling for light GA aircraft is managed by the Bristol and Wessex Aeroplane Club.

In 2012, Bristol Flying Centre doubled the size of its terminal, to 6,500 sq ft (600 m^{2}), with self-contained security facilities and two new passenger lounges. Following the closure of Bristol Filton Airport at the end of 2012, Bristol Flying Centre gained fixed-base operator traffic such as the corporate shuttle for Airbus, flying to Toulouse, and the shuttle for BAE Systems. In July 2013, the Department for Transport gave approval for Bristol Flying Centre to handle charter flights directly, without needing to clear through the main airport terminal.

In 2014, a new building called The Bristol Flying School was constructed to re-house the Bristol & Wessex Aeroplane Club and to contain a flying school operated by Aeros Flight Training, which formerly operated at Filton Airport.

== Accidents and incidents ==
- On 19 January 1970, Vickers Viscount G-AMOA of Cambrian Airways was damaged beyond economic repair in a heavy landing.
