= Ram Hill Colliery =

Coal mine in Gloucestershire, England

Coordinates: 51.520433°N 2.464070°W

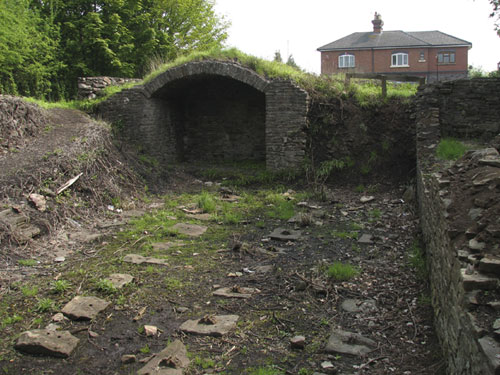

Ram Hill Colliery, (grid reference ST679803) was a privately owned colliery in the Coalpit Heath area north-east of Bristol, England. It operated between about 1825 and 1865.

== General description ==
Ram Hill Colliery was sunk sometime between 1820 and 1830. It was owned by the Coalpit Heath Company, which included Sir John Smyth as a shareholder. Sir John was one of the main proponents of the Bristol and Gloucestershire Railway, which linked the pit and others in the area to Cuckolds Pill in Bristol. At this date workable coal was dependent on a means of transport to market, so that the railway and the pit were interdependent.

Ram Hill was 558 ft deep and was originally worked by a horse gin, the remains of which were still visible in 2006. In later years it was worked by a beam engine. The pit was linked under ground to Churchleaze and Rose Oak Pits, forming the hub of 19th century coal mining in Westerleigh parish.

== Abandonment ==
Abandonment plans show that the colliery, along with other Coalpit Heath pits at Churchleaze and New Engine, closed in the 1860s as the nearby Frog Lane Colliery increased production.

In later years land in the area was purchased by the Great Western Railway for the construction of their direct route between Wootton Bassett and the Severn Tunnel via Badminton. The new line passed through the area in a deep cutting immediately north of the pit.

== Modern studies ==
The site was rediscovered by local archaeologist and author John Cornwell in 1981 and has since been excavated, first by workers on a job creation scheme, and latterly by the "Friends of Ram Hill Colliery" who cleared the area of flora and removed two spoil heaps which were formed during earlier excavations.

Excavation of the Ram Hill site exposed more of the railway, including stone blocks with cast iron chairs in situ and the remains of a boiler house for a steam engine. Other remains at the site included the foundations of a horse gin and the uncapped shaft of the pit.

A geophysical survey, using resistivity, at Ram Hill Colliery has revealed clear traces of a reservoir in the northern corner of the site.

In 2006 the Ram Hill Colliery site was designated by English Heritage as a Scheduled Ancient Monument, recognising the national importance of the site and protecting it in the future.

== Other Coal Mines ==
Churchleaze mine is described at New Engine.

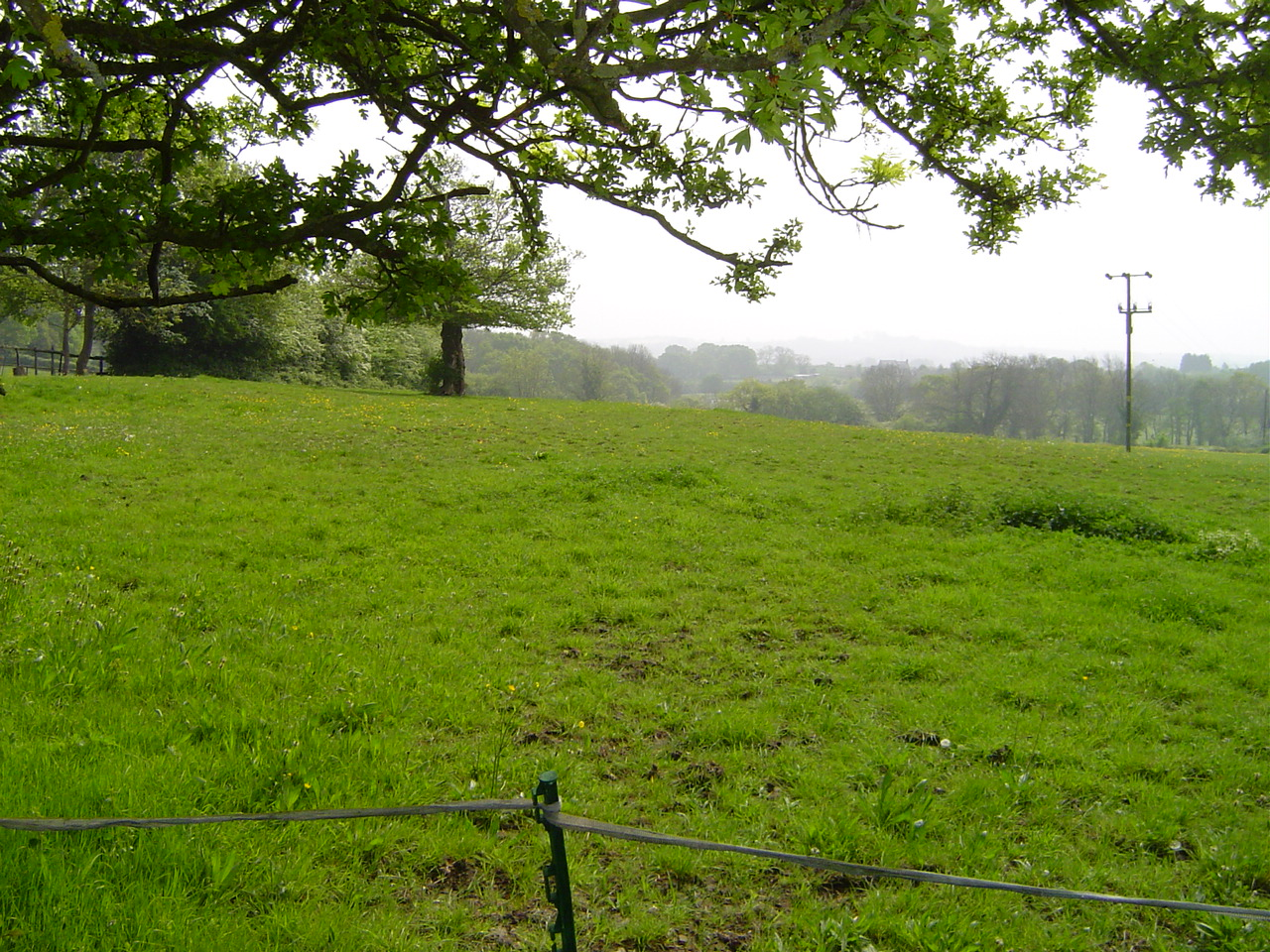
Site of Churchleaze No. 1 Pit (See Ram Hill)

For the nearby Ram Hill Engine Pit, Churchleaze No. 1 Pit and Churchleaze No. 2 Pit see Ram Hill.

Serridge Engine Pit, Orchard (or Middle Wimsey) Pit, No. 11 Pit and New Engine Pit were situated in the neighbouring hamlet of Henfield.
