= Skidmore (surname) =

Origin
- Origin: English
- Region of origin: England

Skidmore is a surname which originated in England in the early Middle Ages.

== Origins ==
Until roughly Tudor times, the Scudamore/Scudemore surname, of which Skidmore is a variant, was mainly associated with a few aristocratic families in Herefordshire (at Rowlstone, Ewyas Harold and Holme Lacy), and also in Gloucestershire (at Westerleigh), Wiltshire (Upton Scudamore), and Hertfordshire (at Rickmansworth).

Ralph de Scudemer ('Scudemer' is believed to have been a lost place-name in Normandy) was a stonemason, brought over from Normandy by the English King Edward the Confessor before the Norman Conquest, around 1060, to help to build castles along the Welsh border. The Saxons knew little of stone castle-building and were building castles mainly of wood but the Normans were already masters of stonemasonry techniques.

The first of these castles which de Scudemer helped to construct was at Ewyas Harold, Herefordshire. Although the castle no longer stands – it had fallen into disrepair by the 16th or 17th century, and most of the stone from it was carried off and "recycled" to build or rebuild certain houses in the village – its motte and keep, perched on a low hill overlooking the village, the River Wye, and the gently sloping Herefordshire countryside, can still be plainly seen a millennium later.

De Scudemer is mentioned five times in the Domesday Book of 1086, often as an undertenant at the castles which he helped to build: Opeton (Upton Scudamore) in Wiltshire; Fifhide (later Fifield Scudamore, now Fifield Bavant, Wiltshire); an unnamed parcel of land at Ewyas Harold, which Warren Skidmore postulates was probably Kaureos, now Corras in Kentchurch; Poscetune (now Poston, Herefordshire); and Little Hatfield (Yorkshire East Riding). These lands can be traced over the next few generations – in some cases, dozens of generations – as they were passed down to the families and descendants of his three sons, Reginald, Walter, and Hugh. Scudamore descendants still occupy Kentchurch Court at Kentchurch, Herefordshire. This 'immigrant generation' is also the last generation in which the family's lands were known to have been equally divided among de Scudemer's three sons; by the next generation, the English laws of primogeniture had largely taken over.

By the mid-12th century, the descendants of Ralph de Scudemer – with elder son Reginald's successors taking over the family's caput at Upton Scudamore in Wiltshire, while Walter's descendants remained in Herefordshire – were listed as witnesses to charters bearing the clearly Norman surnames "d'Escudamor" and "Escudamore." (Youngest son Hugh's descendants soon largely disappeared from view.) These names would morph into the Scudamore surname over the next generation or two, and then later into "Skydemore" and "Skydmore" by 1400.

The name "Skidmore," sometimes also spelled "Skydmore," is a variant of the earlier, but still extant surname "Scudamore." As late as the 17th century, and possibly later, it is documented that some people of this surname used both names interchangeably. For example, a family might be known as "Skidmore" during the week, but be called "Scudamore" when attending church services on Sunday.

By the sixteenth century, around the time that parish registers began to come into common use following the Reformation, the shorter variant "Skidmore" came to be more common, and began to appear in other areas of the United Kingdom where it had not previously been documented in the aristocratic or landowning families. It was also around this time that it ceased to be the case that "Skydmore was Skydmore's cousin everywhere," i.e. it could no longer be said with certainty that all people using this surname were definitively descended from Ralph de Scudemer. "New" Skidmore/Scudamore families such as the large, proliferant ones in the western suburbs of Birmingham (often called the Kingswinford branch after the village of Kingswinford, now in Staffordshire) and "the Chalfonts" – Chalfont St Giles and Chalfont St Peter in Buckinghamshire – could not be proven by traditional genealogical means to have been related to the earlier families in Herefordshire.

By the 1600s, Skidmore families began to appear in the American colonies, and later in Australia, as well as many other places around the world.

== Notable people with the surname ==
- Alan Skidmore (born 1942), English saxophonist
- Art Skidmore (1922–2012), Canadian football player
- Chris Skidmore (born 1981), British politician
- Chris Skidmore (cricketer) (born 1991), English cricketer
- Emily Skidmore, American historian
- Estelle Skidmore Doremus (1830–1905), American philanthropist
- Fletcher Skidmore (1898–1965), American football player
- Francis Skidmore (1817–1896), British metalworker
- Gage Skidmore (born 1993), American photographer
- Gayle Skidmore, American singer-songwriter
- Graham Skidmore (1931–2021), British voice actor and game show announcer
- Hubert Skidmore (1909–1946), American novelists
- Ian Skidmore (1929–2013), English writer and broadcaster
- Jack Skidmore (1919–1999), Australian politician
- James Skidmore (disambiguation), several people
- Jeffrey Skidmore (born 1951), British conductor
- Jimmy Skidmore (1916–1998), English saxophonist
- Joe Skidmore, English footballer
- Kelly Skidmore (born 1962), American politician
- Louis Skidmore (1897–1962), American architect
- Lucy Skidmore Scribner (1853–1931), founder of Skidmore College
- Mark Skidmore (born 1959), Australian military officer
- Mark Skidmore (economist), American economist
- Monique Skidmore (born 1968), Australian anthropologist
- Paul Skidmore (born 1956), American ice hockey player
- Roe Skidmore (born 1945), American baseball player
- Steve Skidmore, British writer of the writing duo The Two Steves
- Thomas Skidmore (1932–2016), American historian
- Thomas Skidmore (reformer) (1790–1832), American political activist
- Walter Skidmore (1903–1993), American basketball coach
