= Mayshill =

Hamlet in England

Coordinates: 51.531°N 2.449°W

Mayshill or Mays Hill is a hamlet located in the Parish of Westerleigh, South Gloucestershire, England. It is located just off the A432 (Badminton Road) between Coalpit Heath and Nibley. A small road runs from the hamlet to Frampton End Road, connecting Frampton Cotterell and Iron Acton. Yate and Westerleigh are also nearby. Despite its size the hamlet contains a pub, dating from the 16th Century. The 'New Inn at Mays Hill', on Badminton Road, there is also a house opposite the pub dating from the 17th Century. Mayshill Cemetery, is located across Badminton Road
