= Skidmore =

Skidmore may refer to:

== Places ==
=== United States ===
- Skidmore, Kansas
- Skidmore, Maryland
- Skidmore, Michigan, an unincorporated community
- Skidmore, Missouri, a city
- Skidmore, Texas
- Skidmore, West Virginia
- Skidmore Fountain, a public fountain in Portland, Oregon

== Other uses ==
- Skidmore (surname), a family name
- Skidmore College, in Saratoga Springs, New York, USA
- Skidmore Studio, a design studio in Detroit, Michigan, United States
- Skidmore v. Swift & Co., a 1944 United States Supreme Court case establishing the Skidmore deference

== See also ==
- Skidmore, Owings & Merrill, an architecture firm
