= Kendleshire =

Coordinates: 51.517°N 2.485°W

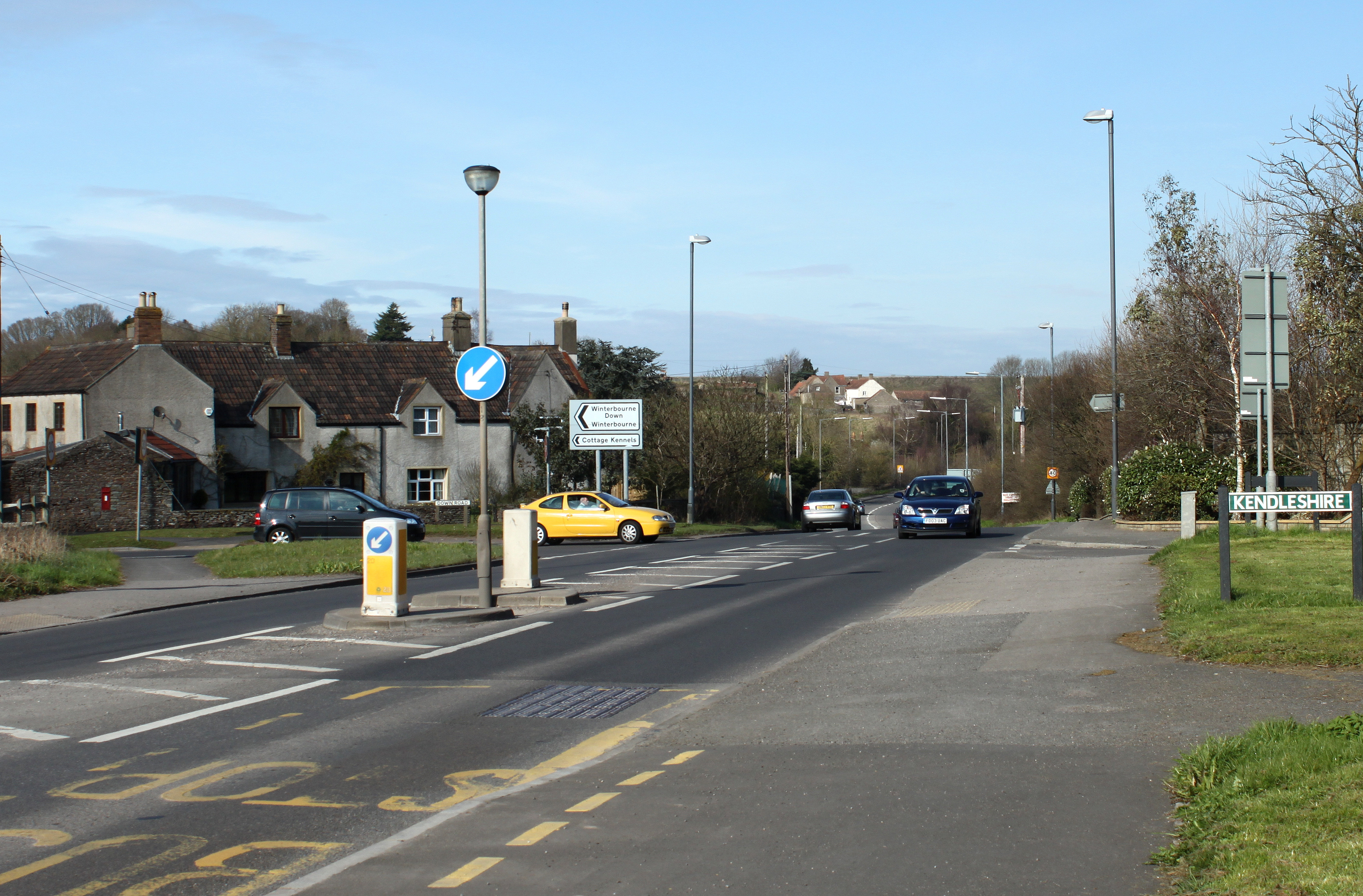
The A432 road in Kendleshire

Kendleshire is a small scattered settlement in South Gloucestershire, England, between Winterbourne Down and Henfield.

Kendleshire hamlet includes about a dozen residences, as well as Woodlands Manor Nursing Home and The Golden Heart public house.

Very little of The Kendleshire Golf Club lies within the hamlet of Kendleshire village. Only the 16th, 22nd (and parts of the 20th & 21st) holes are included in the settlement, the clubhouse and the rest of the course being in Henfield.

During the construction of Kendleshire Golf Club, evidence of many ancient bell pit coal mines was discovered.
