= Ram Hill =

Hamlet in Gloucestershire, England

Coordinates: 51.52°N 02.46°W

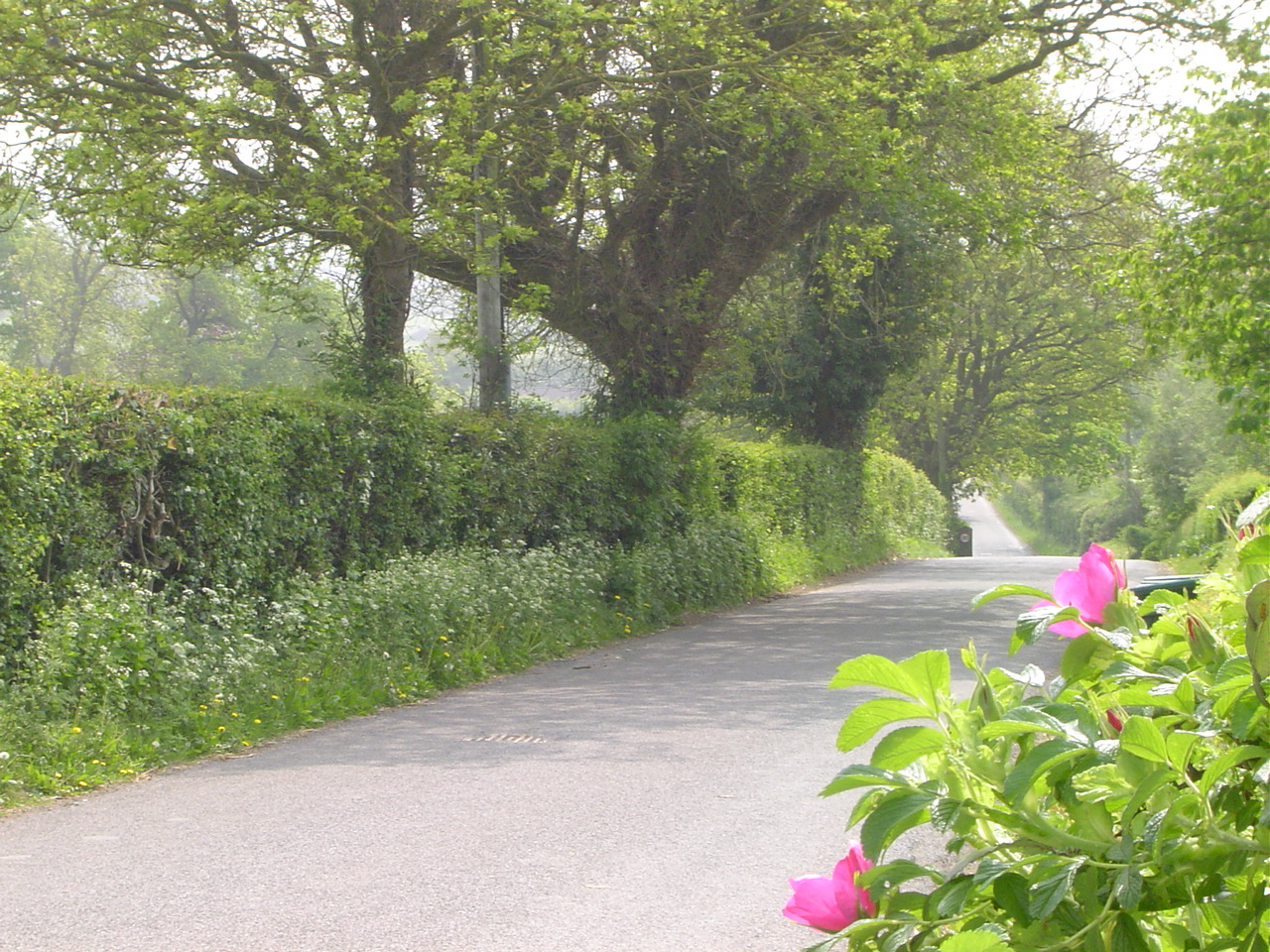
- Ram Hill looking towards Henfield

- Location within Gloucestershire
- Civil parish: Westerleigh and Coalpit Heath
- Unitary authority: South Gloucestershire
- Ceremonial county: Gloucestershire
- Region: South West
- Country: England
- Sovereign state: United Kingdom
- Post town: Bristol
- Postcode district: BS36
- Dialling code: 01454
- Police: Avon and Somerset
- Fire: Avon
- Ambulance: South Western

Ram Hill is a hamlet in the civil parish of Westerleigh and Coalpit Heath, in the South Gloucestershire district, in the ceremonial county of Gloucestershire, England. It is located between Coalpit Heath and Westerleigh and adjoins the hamlet of Henfield immediately to the south. In the Mudge Map 1815, Ram Hill was known as Nutridge Hill, and was linked to Westerleigh by Broad Lane and to Mays Hill by Frog Lane.

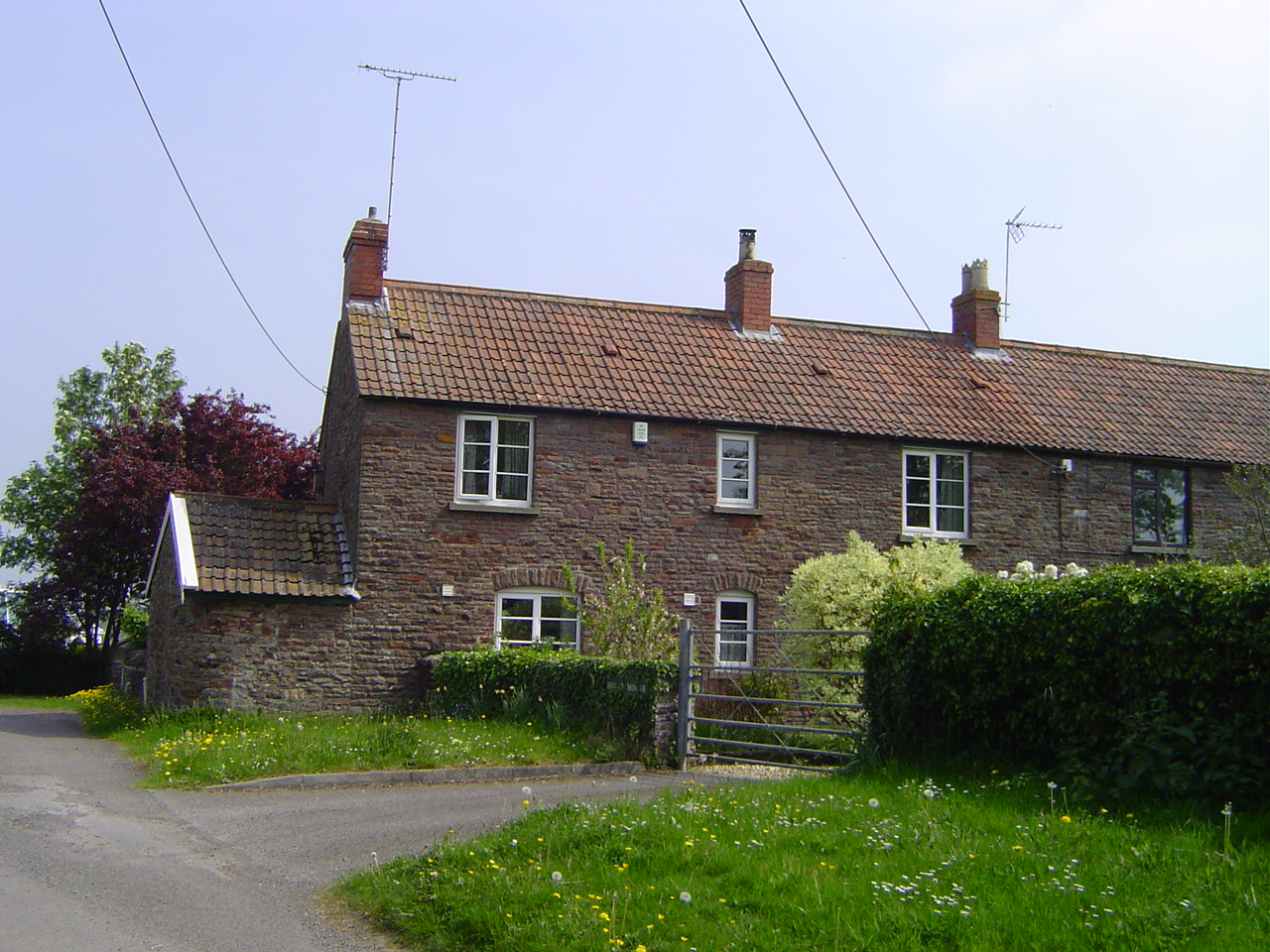
Pennant sandstone miners' cottages on Ram Hill

Ram Hill is a small hamlet that has seen considerable land use change over the recent centuries moving from a traditional agricultural landscape to an active coal mining area by the beginning of the nineteenth century. The population would have increased at that time supported by the introduction of new miner's cottages by the Coalpit Heath Colliery Company.

The closure of Ram Hill Colliery and Churchleaze Pits in the 1860s represented change but the new branch line to the Frog Lane Pit along with the movement of labour to the pit and the nearby Parkfield Colliery would have ensured that the industrial nature of the area was maintained to well into the twentieth century. In 1903 the new Great Western Railway direct route from Badminton to South Wales and the railway sidings at Coalpit Heath Railway Station would also have had an impact.

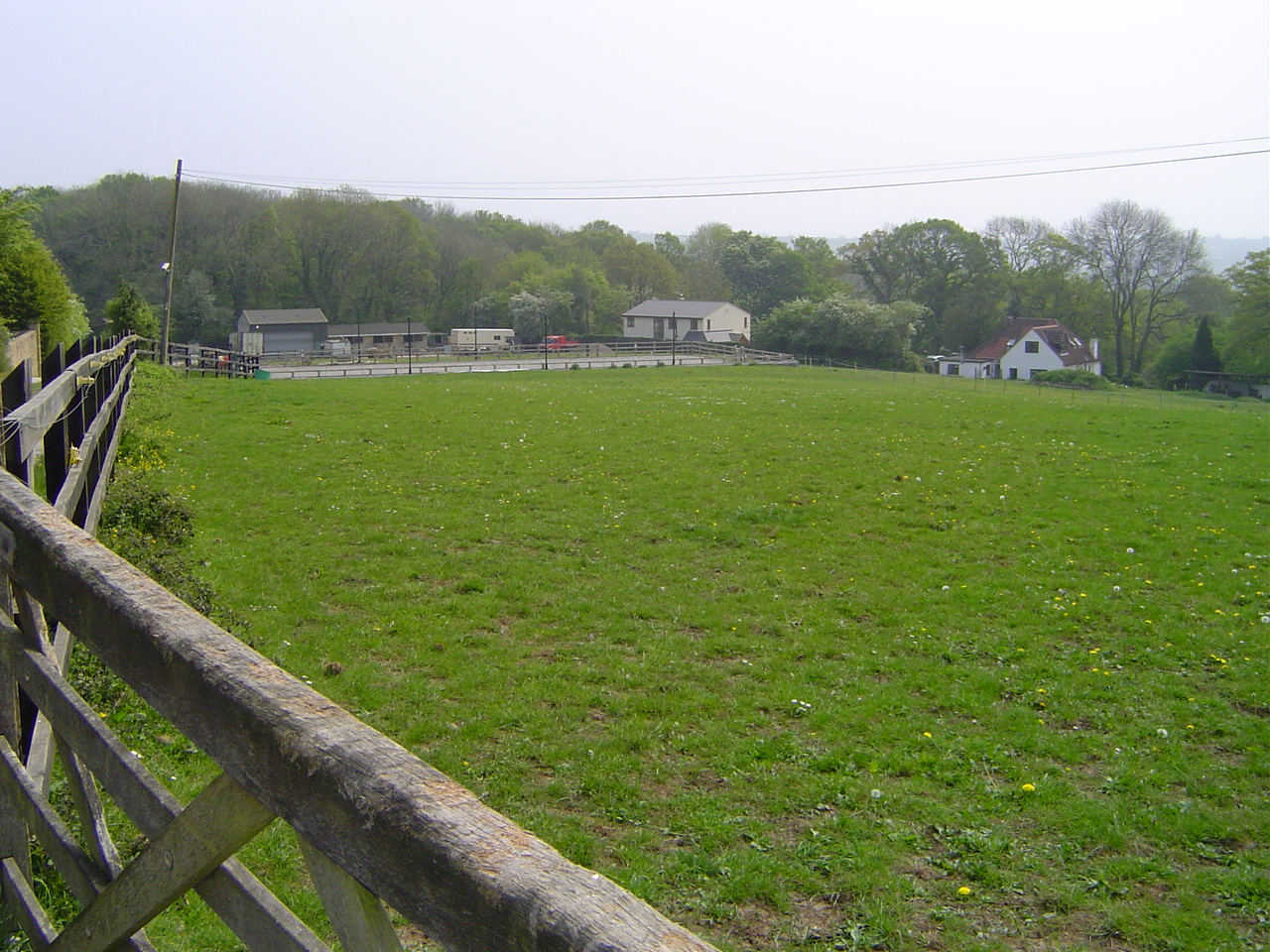
The growing influence of "horsiculture" on the landscape

The closure of the Frog Lane Pit at Coalpit Heath in 1949 represented a step change in the area and Ram Hill reverted to its agricultural roots, a dispersed linear settlement, adjoining the London to South Wales railway, surrounded by pastoral agricultural land. There were new additions at that time with further ribbon development consolidating the 1920s/30s "plotlands" developments along the convergent minor roads. Another addition was the introduction of a caravan site at Greenacres.

Ram Hill was peaceful in the 1950s and early 1960s without extensive noise and light pollution. The construction of the M4 Motorway to the south of Henfield in the late 1960s began to change the character of the area and the increasing encroachment of night-time lights highlighted the continuing expansion of Bristol and Yate. In time Ram Hill has lost its rural tranquillity and adopted a new role as a commuter satellite to the main urban areas. At the same time the character of the landscape has changed with dairy farming being replaced by new uses in particular "horsiculture".

== Industrial archaeology ==
=== Coal mines ===
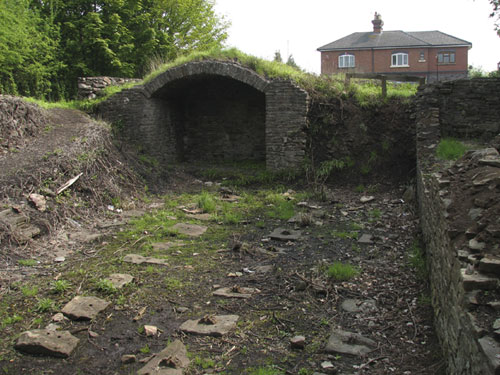
Site of Ram Hill Colliery

Ram Hill is situated near the centre of the North Bristol Coal Field, this area at one time having been a coal mining community. Coal had been mined in this area since the fourteenth century and most likely even earlier. However it was Sir Samuel Astry, Lord of the Manor of Westerleigh c1680 who started mining on a grander scale and his descendants, or their business partners, continued to be connected with the Coalpit Heath Colliery Company.

Within Ram Hill itself there were four mines operational in the early nineteenth century:

- Ram Hill Engine Pit was an older pit that lay 300 yards downhill to the west of the Ram Hill Colliery. The pit shaft had a depth of 510 ft and the 1772 map records that an early pumping beam engine operated in the pit. According to MJH Southway (1971) the engine at this site had a 7 ft stroke, working 8 strokes per minute and raising 28 gallons per stroke by means of an 11" pump lifting 224 gallons per minute.

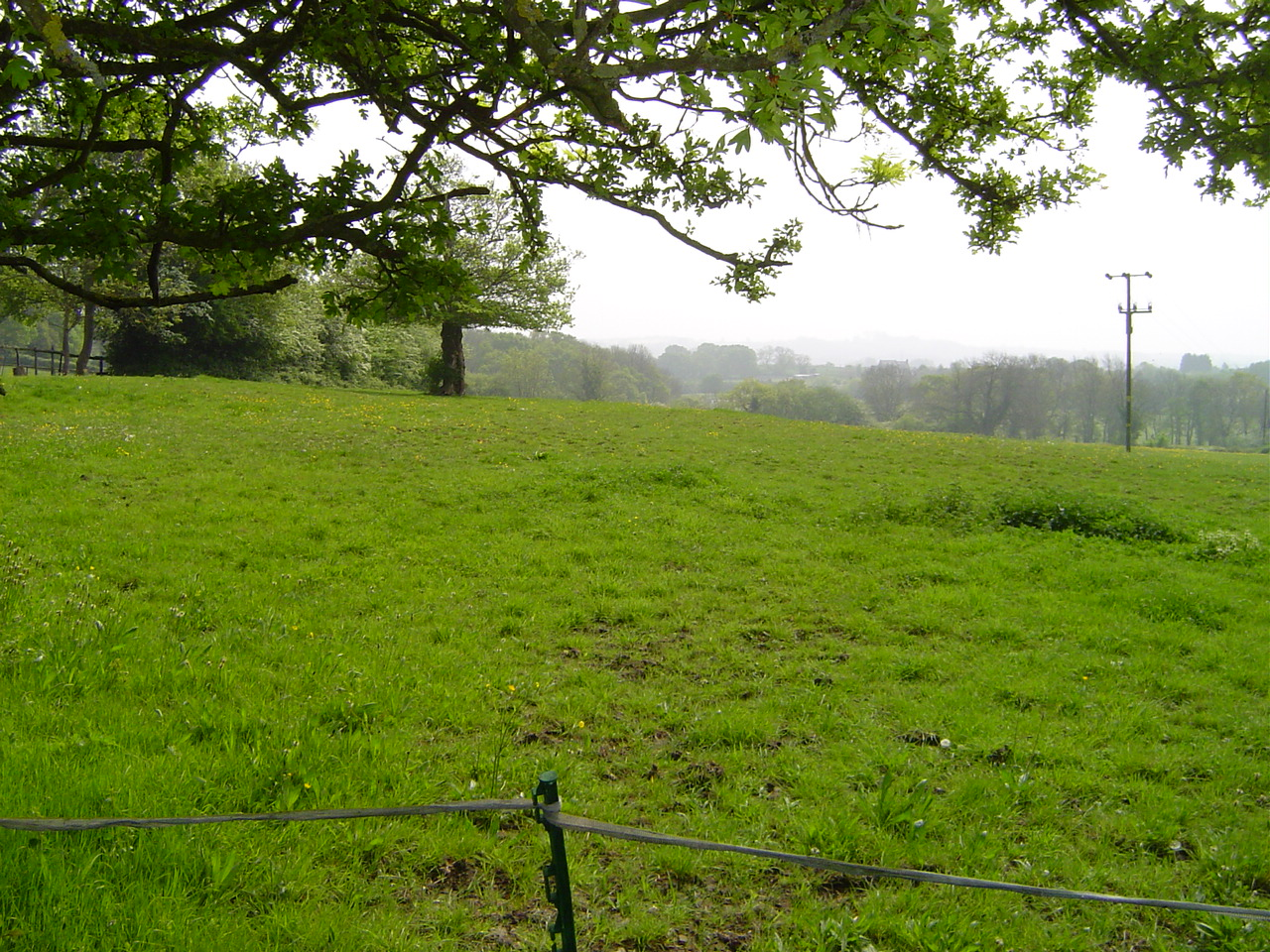
Site of Churchleaze No. 1 Pit (with the Dramway which ran along the boundary on the left-hand side).

- Ram Hill Colliery site lies beside the London to South Wales rail line and stands on British Rail land near the Ha' Penny Bridge. The pit was 558 ft deep and was abandoned around 1860. A number of remains are discernible on the ground including the horse gin, the shaft and the tramway lines finishing at an arch. In 2006 the Ram Hill Colliery site was designated by English Heritage as a Scheduled Ancient Monument.
- Churchleaze No. 1 Pit lay beside the Dramway where it crosses Serridge Lane (previously known as Churchleaze). The mine site was clearly visible in the 1960s but was "tidied up" by a local farmer and now apart from a declivity in the ground no traces of the pit remain.
- Churchleaze No. 2 Pit lay to the south of Pit No. 1, adjoining Henfield Road.

For the nearby Serridge Engine Pit, Orchard (or Middle Wimsey) Pit, No. 11 Pit and New Engine Pit see Henfield.

The underground map of around 1850 shows that the underground roads of the Ram Hill Colliery and Churchleaze pits on Ram Hill joined together with those of the Serridge Engine and New Engine pits in Henfield.

=== Dramway ===
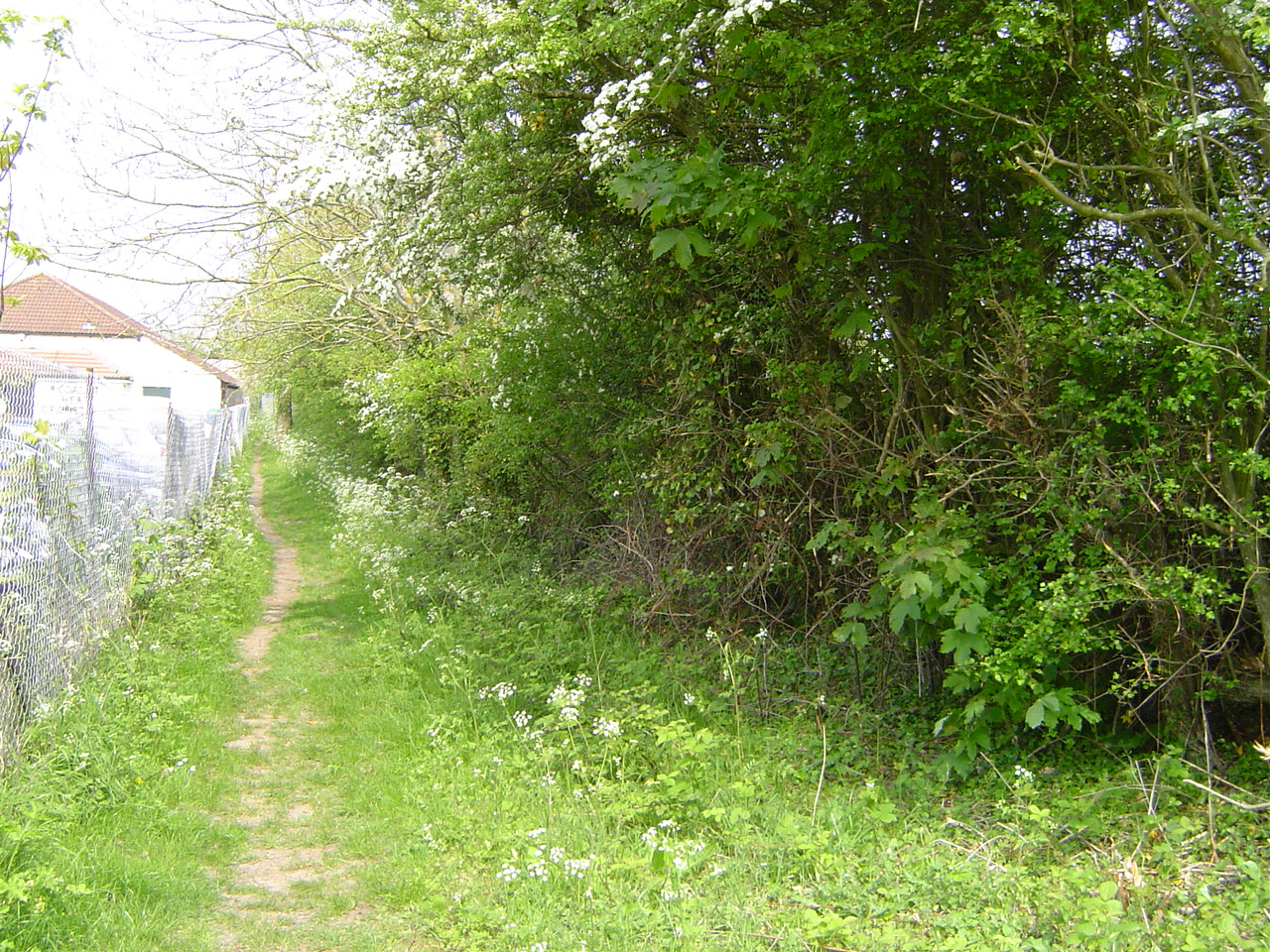
Site of the Dramway at Ram Hill, next to the Coalpit Heath Cricket Club

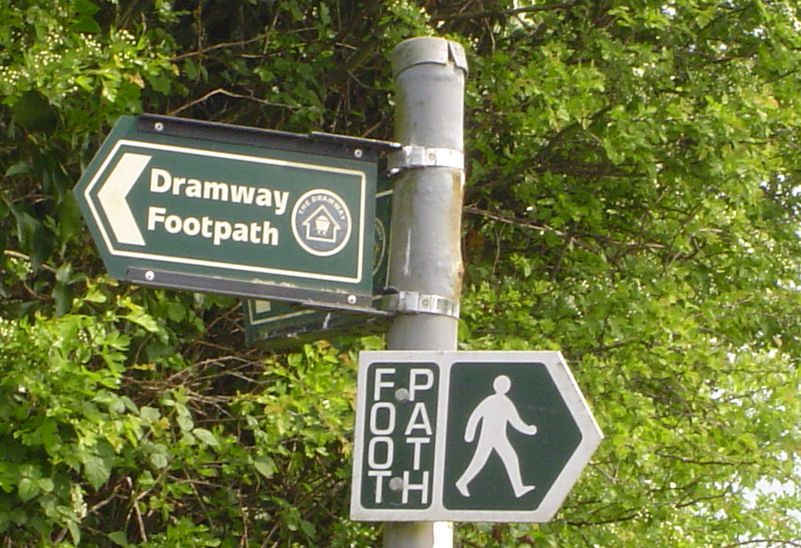
Dramway Footpath Sign

In the Avon and Gloucestershire Railway Act 1828 (9 Geo. 4. c. xciv), Parliament granted permission to the Avon and Gloucester Railway Company to build a dramway (horse-drawn railway) from Ram Hill to the River Avon and this section of the dramway was completed and in use by July 1832. The Ram Hill Colliery was the northern terminus of the Dramway and to the south of Bitterwell Lake there was also a southern spur to New Engine Pit in Henfield.

This early tramway scheme was designed to provide transport from the mines of Coalpit Heath to the wharves on the Avon at Keynsham which supplied both Bristol and Bath. The Dramway was built as a single track railway, built to a standard 4 ft 8in gauge, with passing places along the route. The whole length of the railway was built on a down hill gradient dropping 225 ft along the route. It lasted only nine years before a steam railway connected the pits.

=== Railways ===
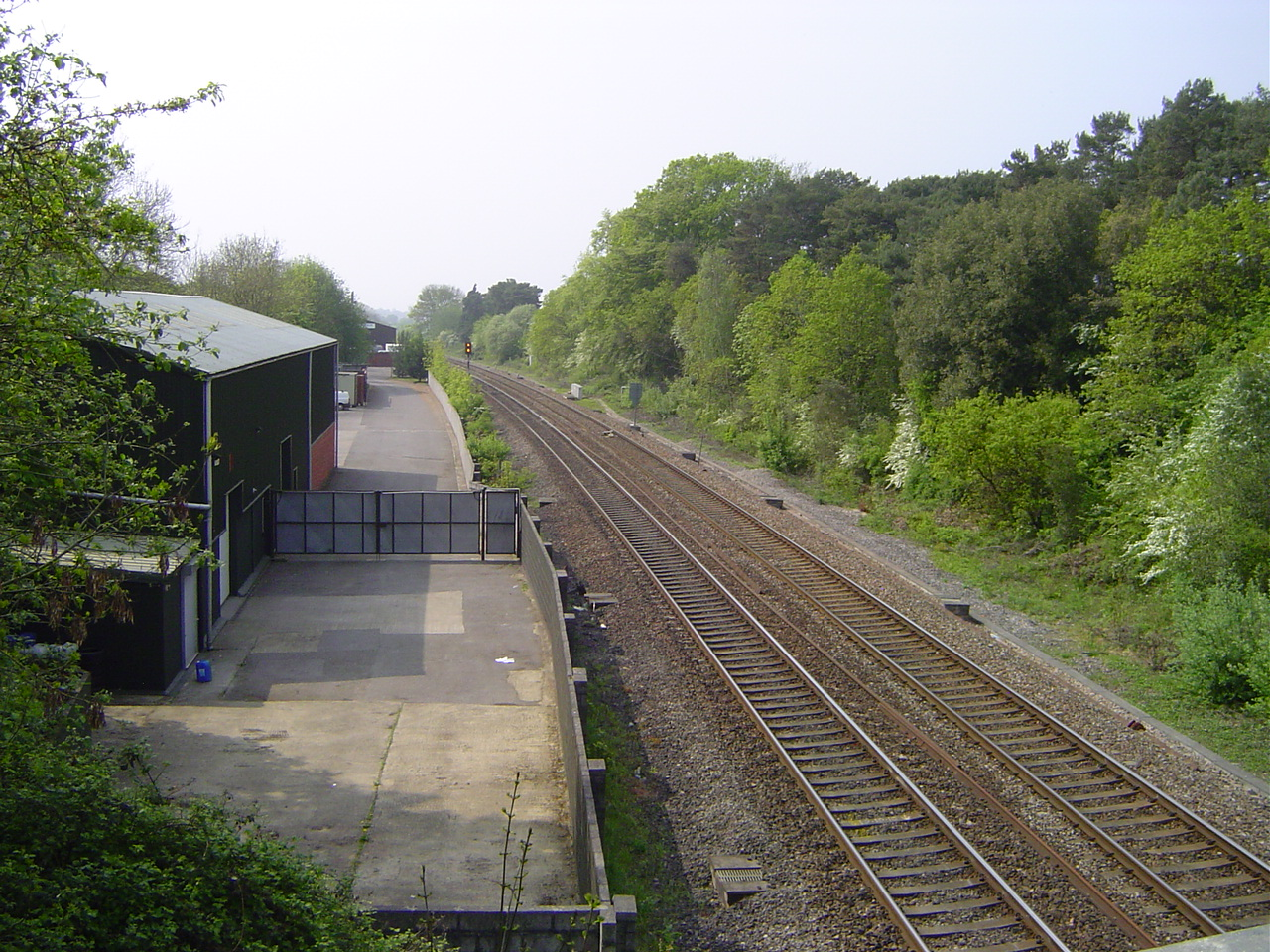
The site of Coalpit Heath Railway Station and goods yard sidings now part of Ram Hill Business Park

Soon after the horse-drawn tramway was in operation pressure built up to convert the line to accommodate steam driven locomotives as the Great Western Railway (GWR) were keen to build a 7 ft gauge line from Bristol to Gloucester. The Bristol and Gloucester Company under the influence of the GWR started to convert the 4 ft 8in tramway to a 7 ft railway on 5 June 1844 and this was completed by 9 July. However the colliery owners at Coalpit Heath still had the right to transport their coal in 4 ft 8in trucks and the section of Dramway from Bitterwell Lake to Mangotsfield North Junction was the first dual gauge railway in the country. Another twist was that the line was sold to the Midland Railway in 1845 rather than to the GWR.

In the 1st edition (1881) Ordnance Survey Map it shows that the southern branch of the railway line finishes at the New Engine Pit at Henfield, the centre branch having served Ram Hill Colliery. In around 1860 a northern branch was constructed near Boxhedge Farm that served the new Frog Lane Pit at Coalpit Heath. This line remained operational for almost 90 years until the closure of the mine in 1949.

The South Wales Main Line was re-routed following the opening of the Severn Tunnel in 1886. The new route was established in 1903 with the building of what is often known as the Badminton Line. This involved the construction of about 33 miles of new track, part of which skirted Ram Hill and Coalpit Heath. The Great Western Railway purchased the land at the Ram Hill Colliery site in 1898 and a deep railway cutting was created immediately north of the former mine. To the west the Coalpit Heath Railway Station was opened and goods yard sidings established. The station fell victim to Dr Beeching's cuts and was closed in the 1960s.

== Community facilities ==
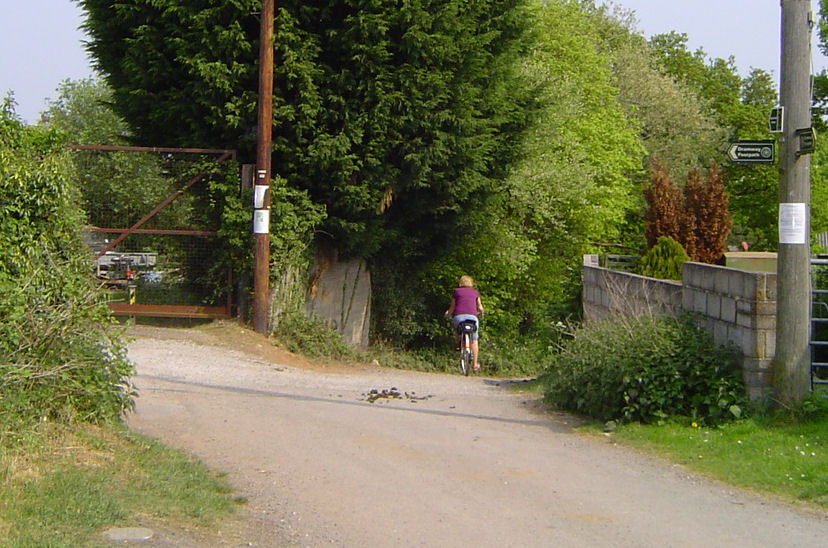
Cycle route at Broad Lane

Being a small hamlet Ram Hill does not have its own community facilities although the social facilities are available at Coalpit Heath Cricket Club in Serridge Lane. Social and recreational facilities are provided at Henfield Village Hall, Bitterwell Lake and the Newman Field amenity area in the adjoining hamlet of Henfield.

The hamlet is well served with footpaths and cycleways.

== Governance ==
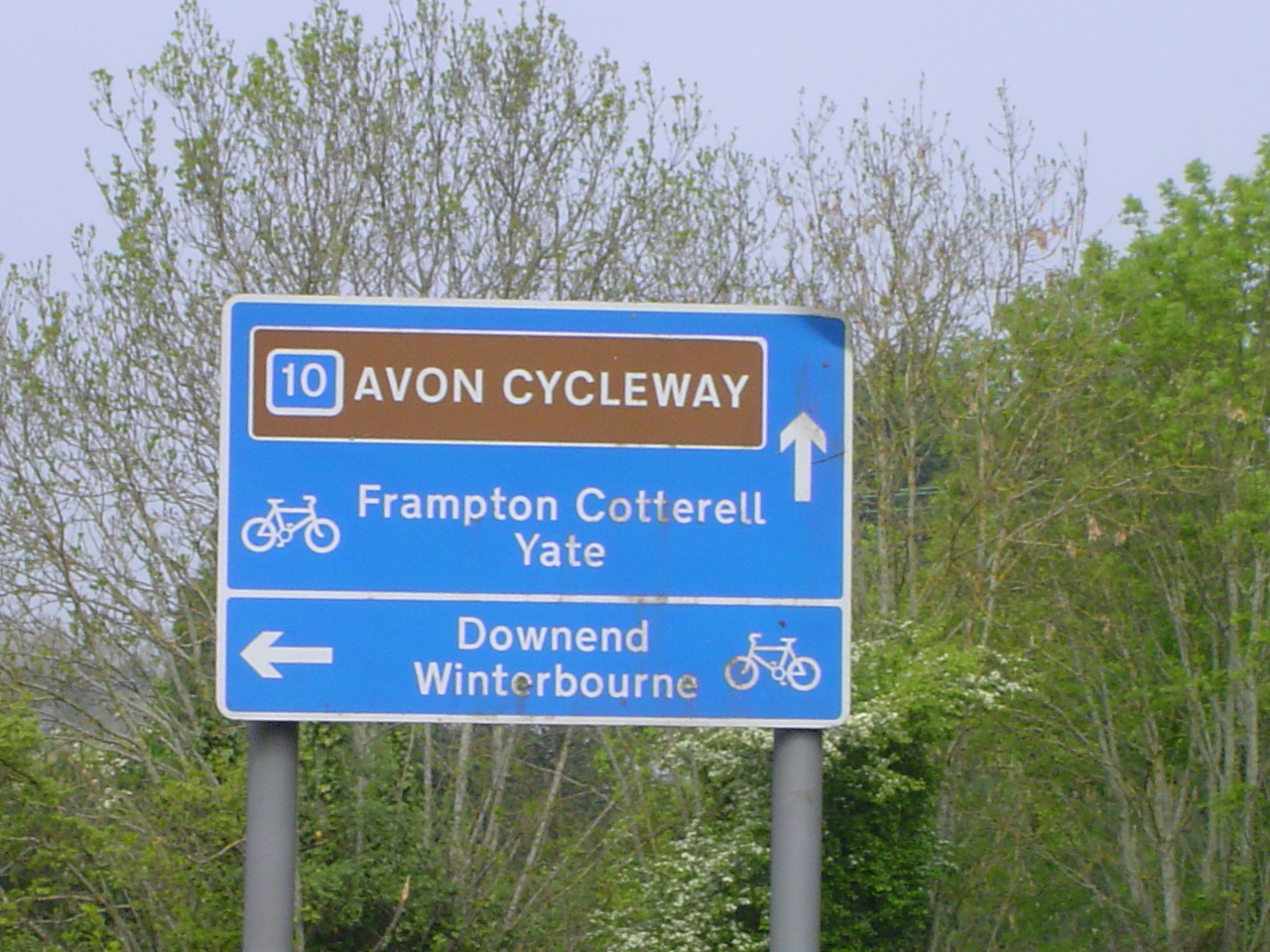
Avon Cycleway sign

The two tiers of local government responsible for administering Ram Hill:

- South Gloucestershire Council
- Westerleigh Parish Council

== Planning ==
In the adopted South Gloucestershire Local Plan Ram Hill does not have a Defined Settlement Boundary on the Proposals Map and there are no sites allocated for new residential development.

The hamlet is within an area defined as Green Belt and is located within the Forest of Avon area. There are also Major Recreational Routes in the hamlet.

== Environment ==
=== Landscape ===
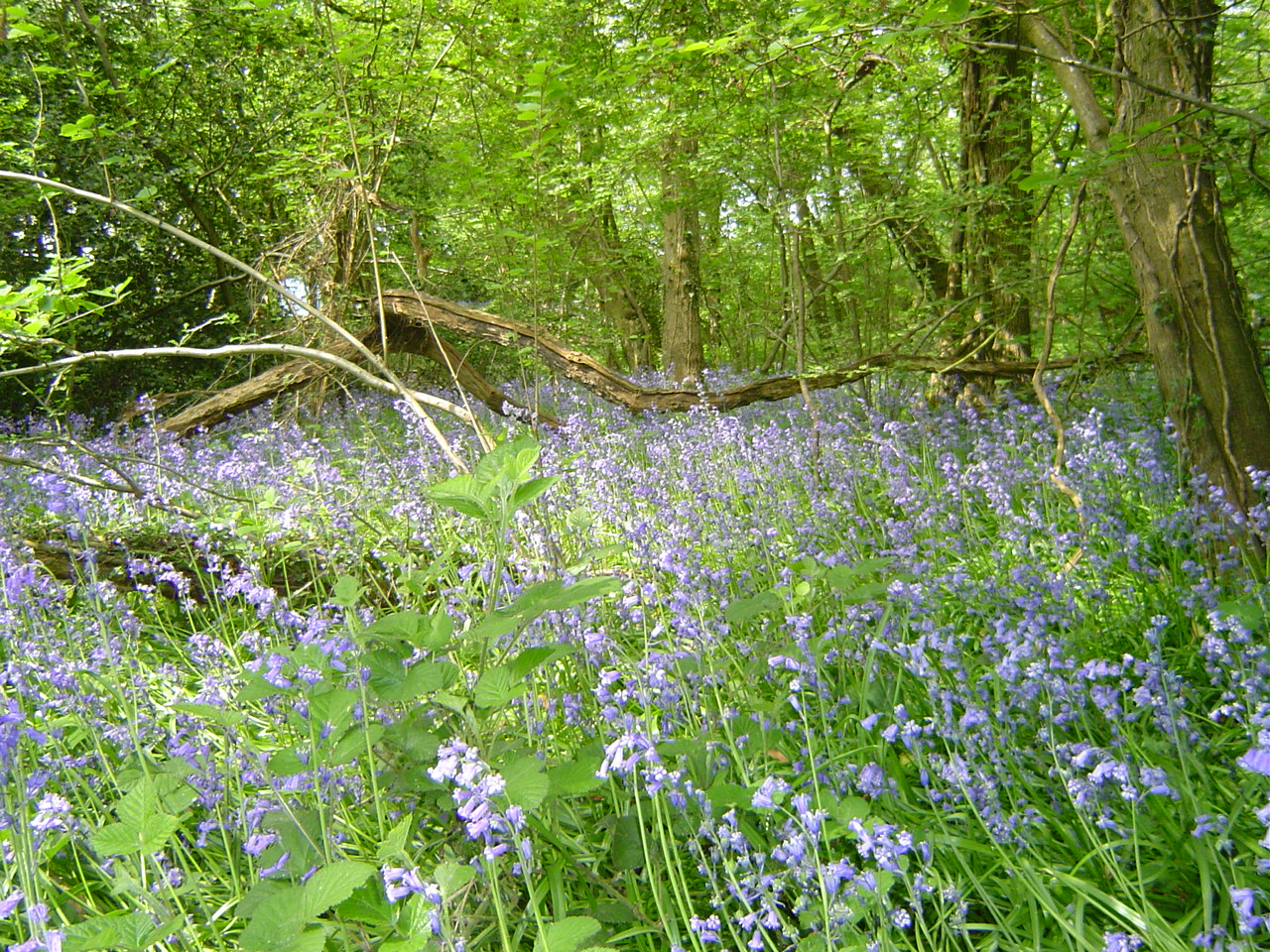
Bluebells at Martin Croft Brake

Within the South Gloucestershire Landscape Character Assessment SPD the hamlet of Ram Hill is within an area defined as:

Westerleigh Vale and Oldland Ridge – The Study indicates that Ram Hill, a colliery settlement, and Henfield are small dispersed/linear and clustered hamlets respectively, consisting of a mix of Pennant sandstone with more recent render and brick buildings, focused around a convergence of minor roads and lanes. Around the two settlements are scattered farms.

The area of Ram Hill and Henfield comprises a largely strong, irregular rural framework with areas of woodland, mixed overgrown/clipped hedgerows supplemented with wire fences, defining regular shaped fields. The clustered settlement pattern and non-agricultural activities such as storage compounds, are reasonably well integrated as a result of this framework. Horse paddocks are however locally evident where hedgerows have become replaced with fences. Associated ad hoc home-made stables are also evident and atypical of a rural landscape. Large modern agricultural sheds are prominent within older farm complexes within this area.

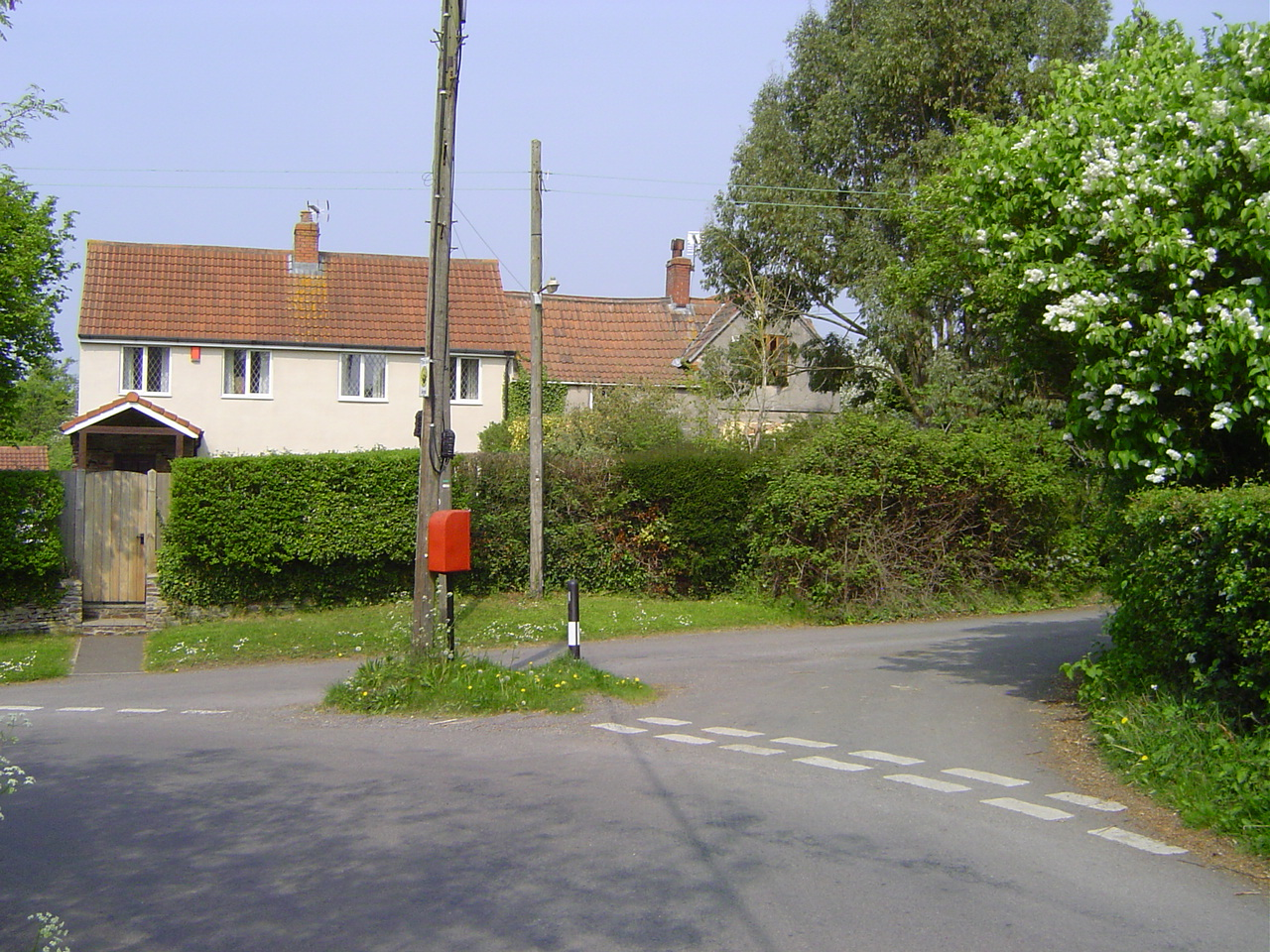
The small scale settlement of Ram Hill – well integrated within the framework of hegerow trees

The small scale settlement at Ram Hill and Henfield is largely well integrated within the framework of hegerow trees and woodland. The area has a generally tranquil character, although the presence of stables and fences associated with the increase in land use change to "horsiculture". modern large farm buildings and storage compounds, can detract from this, visually eroding the rural character and resulting in removal or fragmentation of hedgerows. In places the recreational pressure for "horsiculture" with the associated infrastructure of stables, access tracks, exercise areas, jumps and floodlighting, can result in a change in landscape character.

=== Biodiversity ===
One area of Broadleaved Woodland at Ram Hill is identified by South Gloucestershire Council as a Site of Nature Conservation Importance:

- Martin Croft Brake

There are no Sites of Special Scientific Interest within the hamlet.

== Sport and recreation ==
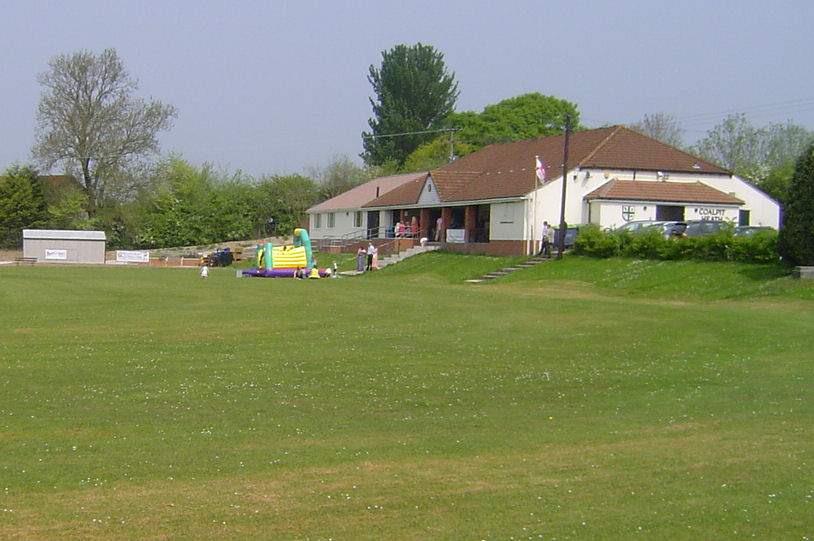
Coalpit Heath Cricket Club

=== Coalpit Heath Cricket Club ===
Coalpit Heath Cricket Club, situated in Serridge Lane (formerly known as Chuchleaze) at Ram Hill, has well over 100 years of history. It was based for many years at the recreation ground at Coalpit Heath but has relocated to Serridge Lane where a clubhouse has been created which includes social facilities and a skittle alley. The club is a family orientated club running three Senior sides on Saturdays in the Bristol and District Leagues and a Sunday side in the Village Cricket League.

The club also provides facilities for young players to learn and play the game of cricket within their Youth section. The club is affiliated to the Gloucestershire Cricket Board, Bristol & District Cricket Association and Bristol Youth Cricket League.

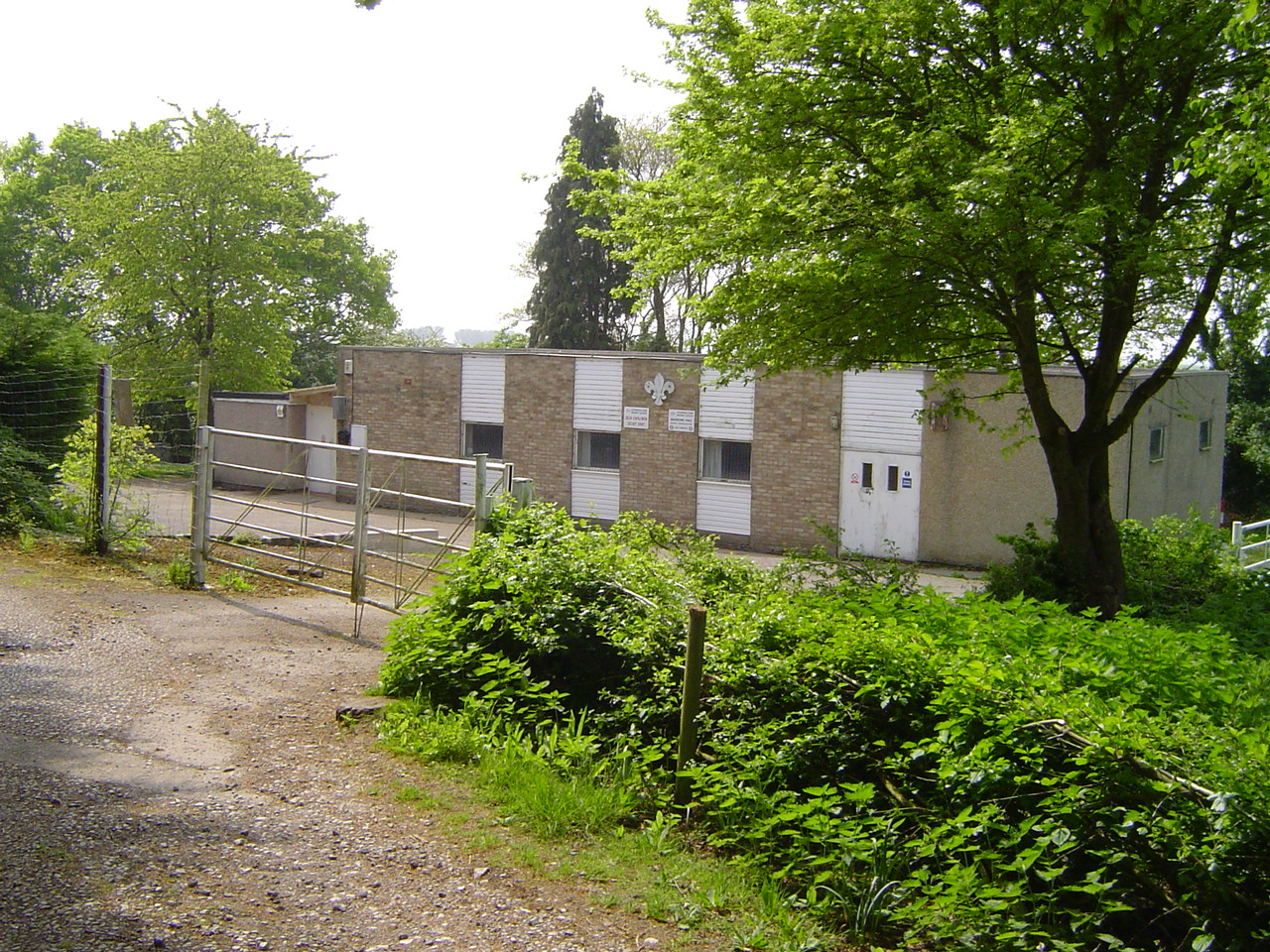
Mafeking Hall

=== Mafeking Hall ===
This Scout Hall is located at Serridge Lane, Ram Hill and is run by the Cotswold Edge District Scout Council. Both the Hall and Tullett Field are available for hire.

== Economy ==
- Ram Hill Business Park – At the old Coalpit Heath Railway Station and associated goods yard sidings a small business park has been created.

== Education ==
The hamlet is served by The Manor C of E Primary School, Coalpit Heath, a primary school catering for pupils aged 5–11.

Older children attend The Ridings Federation Winterbourne International Academy.

== Transport ==
Ram Hill is served by one bus service:

- 686: Chipping Sodbury – Yate – Ram Hill – Mangotsfield – Kingswood (supported by South Gloucestershire Council)

== Notable former resident ==
- Gordon Bennett – who was chief executive of Bristol Rovers, Norwich City F.C. and Aberdeen F.C. and more recently has been Head of Youth Development at Stoke City and holds a similar position at Plymouth Argyle.
