= Gordon Bennett (football executive) =

English football coach (died 2020)

Gordon Bennett was the Head of Youth Development at League Two side Plymouth Argyle.

Earlier in his career, Bennett was Chief Executive of Bristol Rovers and Norwich City F.C. His time at Carrow Road was significant enough that in 2003, he was made an inaugural member of the Norwich City Hall of Fame. After leaving Norwich, Bennett worked for Aberdeen F.C. and while working there he remarked, "When you have a name like mine I am bound to be latched upon".

In 1969 Bennett won an ITV and Daily Mail-sponsored fan-of-the-year competition. By answering a series of questions on his beloved Bristol Rovers, Bennett earned a trip to the Mexico World Cup and a £1,000 cheque. Personally, the prizes did not interest him. He gave the tickets away to the runner-up and presented the money as a gift to Rovers. Bennett spent his early years at Ram Hill, Coalpit Heath, near Bristol and in his playing days Bennett played amateur football for Henfield Youth AFC.

He died on 17 September 2020.
