= James Scudamore =

James Scudamore may refer to:

- James Scudamore (courtier) (1568–1619), courtier to Queen Elizabeth I and Custos Rotulorum of Herefordshire, 1616–1619
- James Scudamore (died 1668) (1624–1668), English Member of Parliament for Hereford, 1642–1643, and Herefordshire, 1661–1668
- James Scudamore, 3rd Viscount Scudamore (1684–1716), MP for Herefordshire, 1705–1715, and Hereford, 1715–1716
- James Scudamore (veterinary surgeon), former Chief Veterinary Officer for the United Kingdom
- James Scudamore (author) (born 1976), British author

== See also ==
- James Skidmore (disambiguation)
