= Skidmore Studio =

Design studio in Detroit, USA

- Company type: Private
- Industry: Design
- Founded: 1959
- Headquarters: Detroit, Michigan
- Key people: Drew Patrick, Owner & President
- Services: Branding strategy, packaging design, illustration, copywriting, audience insights, positioning, web design, photography direction, visual identity & logos
- Website: www.skidmorestudio.com

Skidmore Studio is a multi-disciplinary design studio headquartered in Detroit, Michigan. Founded by Leo Skidmore in 1959, the company began as an illustration studio for the automotive industry. Today, Skidmore Studio provides branding and design services to a range of consumer packaged goods companies and cultural institutions. The studio employs approximately 16 employees, including graphic designers, illustrators, copywriters, producers, and strategists.

== History ==
Skidmore Studio was established in 1959 as an automotive illustration studio. The studio built a reputation in the 1950s and 60s for illustration work completed for Ford, General Motors and Chrysler. Until the mid 1970s, the studio worked exclusively on automotive advertising with local and national advertising agencies such as Campbell Ewald, Leo Burnett Worldwide, McCann Worldwide, Team Detroit and Doner. At the time, Skidmore employed many notable illustrators in addition to Leo Skidmore including Ed Fella, Ron Alexander, John Ball, Ann Bauer, Stephen Magsig, Scott Olds and Bryan Stolzenburg.

In the early 1990s, Leo Skidmore’s daughter Mae Skidmore assumed ownership of the studio. With then Vice President Tim Smith, Skidmore expanded the studio’s offering and client base to include corporate clients such as the Detroit Institute of Arts, Detroit Symphony Orchestra and Detroit Medical Center. In 2010, then-president Tim Smith, acquired majority interest of the studio and became CEO.

In 2011, the studio relocated from Royal Oak, Michigan to downtown Detroit, furthering the city's resurgence of the creative class. Skidmore Studio now resides as the anchor tenant of the historic Madison Theatre Building, an entrepreneurial hub for creative and tech companies. The studio occupies the entire fourth floor of the Madison, taking up 9,800 square feet. It was purchased in November 2010 by Dan Gilbert, Chairman and Founder of Quicken Loans as part of his Detroit real estate initiatives. Skidmore Studio was the first official tenant of Gilbert’s real estate development firm, Bedrock. In January 2018, then-owner Tim Smith died suddenly. The studio was left to his wife and partner, Colleen Smith. In October 2018, Drew Patrick, previously the company’s CFO and president, purchased the studio from Smith.

=== Project history ===
During the 1950s and 1960s, the studio was respected as one of the country's most talented automotive illustration studios. Notable advertising campaigns from that period included work for:

- Ford
- Pontiac
- Detroit Diesel
- Buick
- Lincoln
- Dodge
- Mercury

In the 1970s and 1980s, Skidmore continued developing national advertising campaigns for a wider clientele that included:

- McDonald's
- Portland Cement Association
- Reynold's Aluminum
- Key Video

In the 1990s and 2000s, Skidmore transitioned to a direct-to-client model with a renewed focus on the local market for clients like:

- Ski-Doo
- Detroit Institute of Arts
- Detroit Symphony Orchestra

In the 2010s, Skidmore further specialized in branding and identity, with a focus on the food and entertainment industries both locally and nationally. Current and past clients include:

- Dave & Buster’s
- American Express
- Regal Cinemas
- Family Finest
- Michigan Farm to Freezer
- Inspired Organics
- Halo Burger
- Universal Orlando Resort
- Xenith
- Skis.com
- The Detroit Tigers

== Free Art Friday Detroit ==
In 2011, the studio launched Free Art Friday Detroit, a free art scavenger hunt in the city of Detroit. With a mission to elevate the profile of the city's creative community and encourage people to explore the city, Free Art Friday Detroit (FAFDET) has become a weekly art event throughout the city.
