= Henfield, Gloucestershire =

Hamlet in Gloucestershire, England

Coordinates: 51.51°N 02.46°W

Henfield
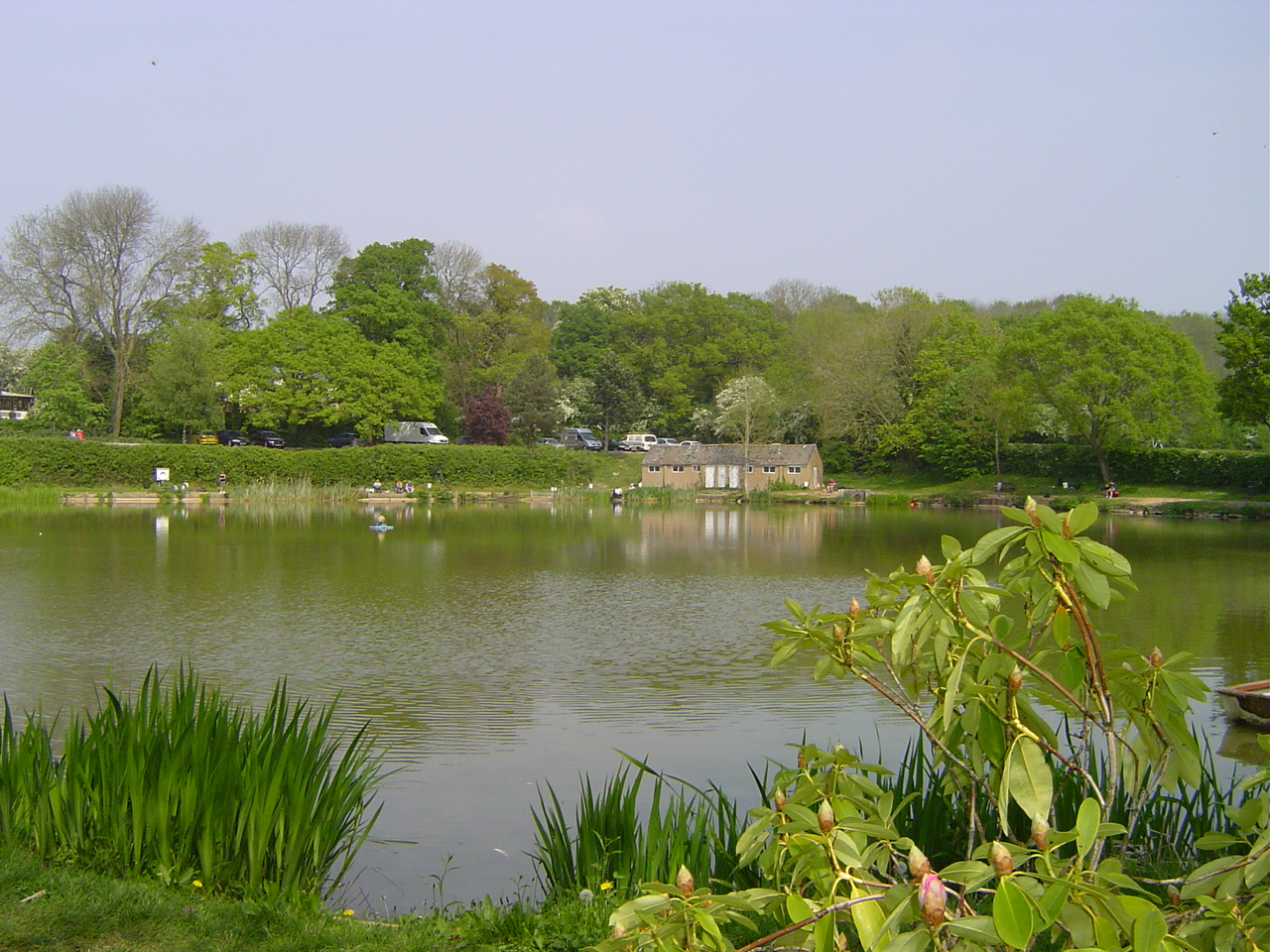
- Bitterwell Lake

- Location within Gloucestershire
- Civil parish: Westerleigh and Coalpit Heath
- Unitary authority: South Gloucestershire
- Ceremonial county: Gloucestershire
- Region: South West
- Country: England
- Sovereign state: United Kingdom
- Post town: Bristol
- Postcode district: BS36
- Dialling code: 0117
- Police: Avon and Somerset
- Fire: Avon
- Ambulance: South Western

Henfield is a hamlet in the civil parish of Westerleigh and Coalpit Heath in South Gloucestershire, England. It is located between Coalpit Heath and Westerleigh in the Avon Green Belt, less than a mile outside of the Bristol Built-up Area and 7 miles (11 km) north-east of Bristol city centre. The hamlet of Ram Hill is immediately to the north.

== History ==
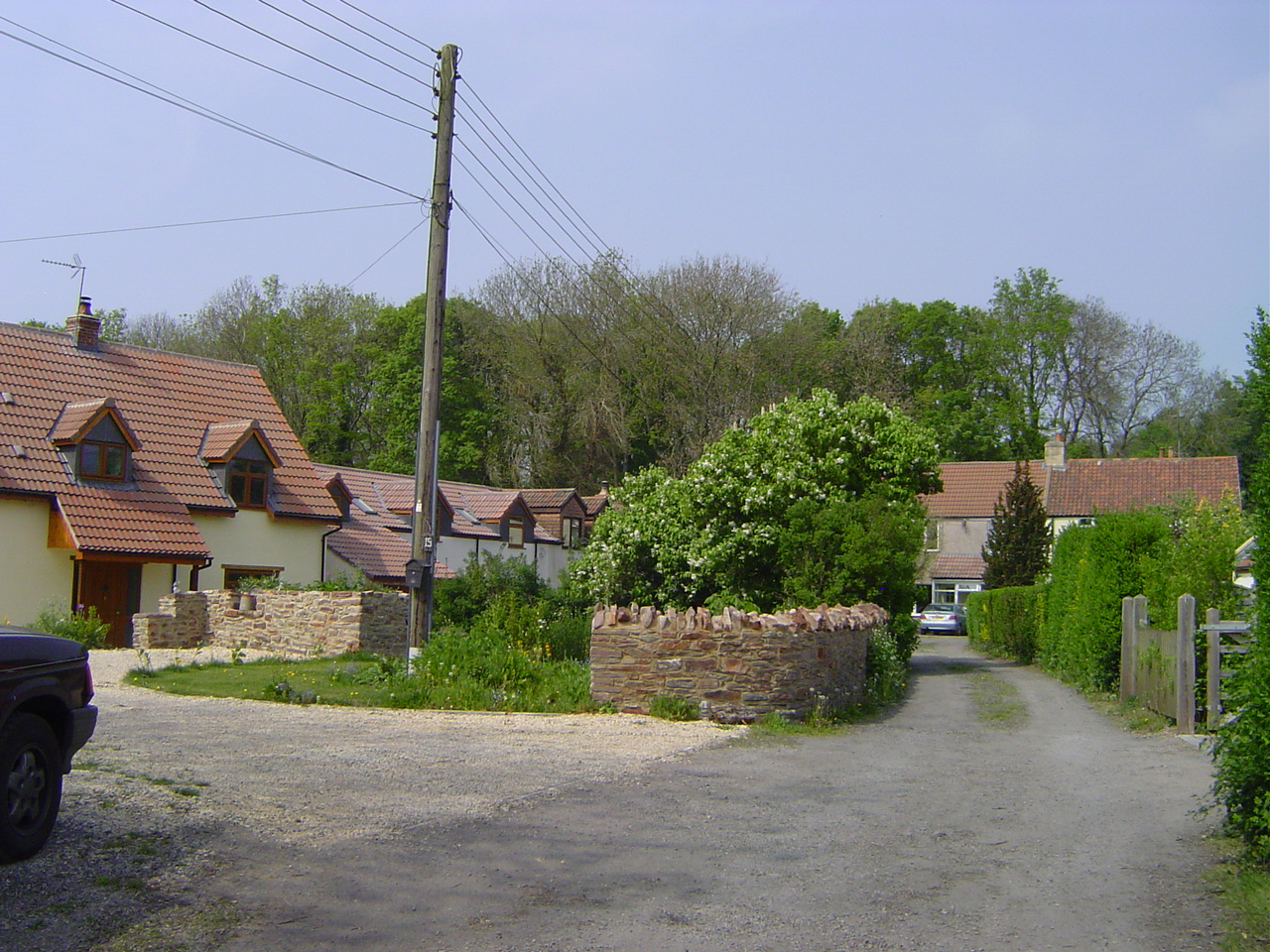
Hamlet of Henfield – a former colliery settlement.

Henfield has seen considerable land use change during recent centuries, moving from a traditional agricultural landscape to an active coal mining area by the beginning of the 19th century. With the arrival of the railways, it remained an industrial village into the 20th century.

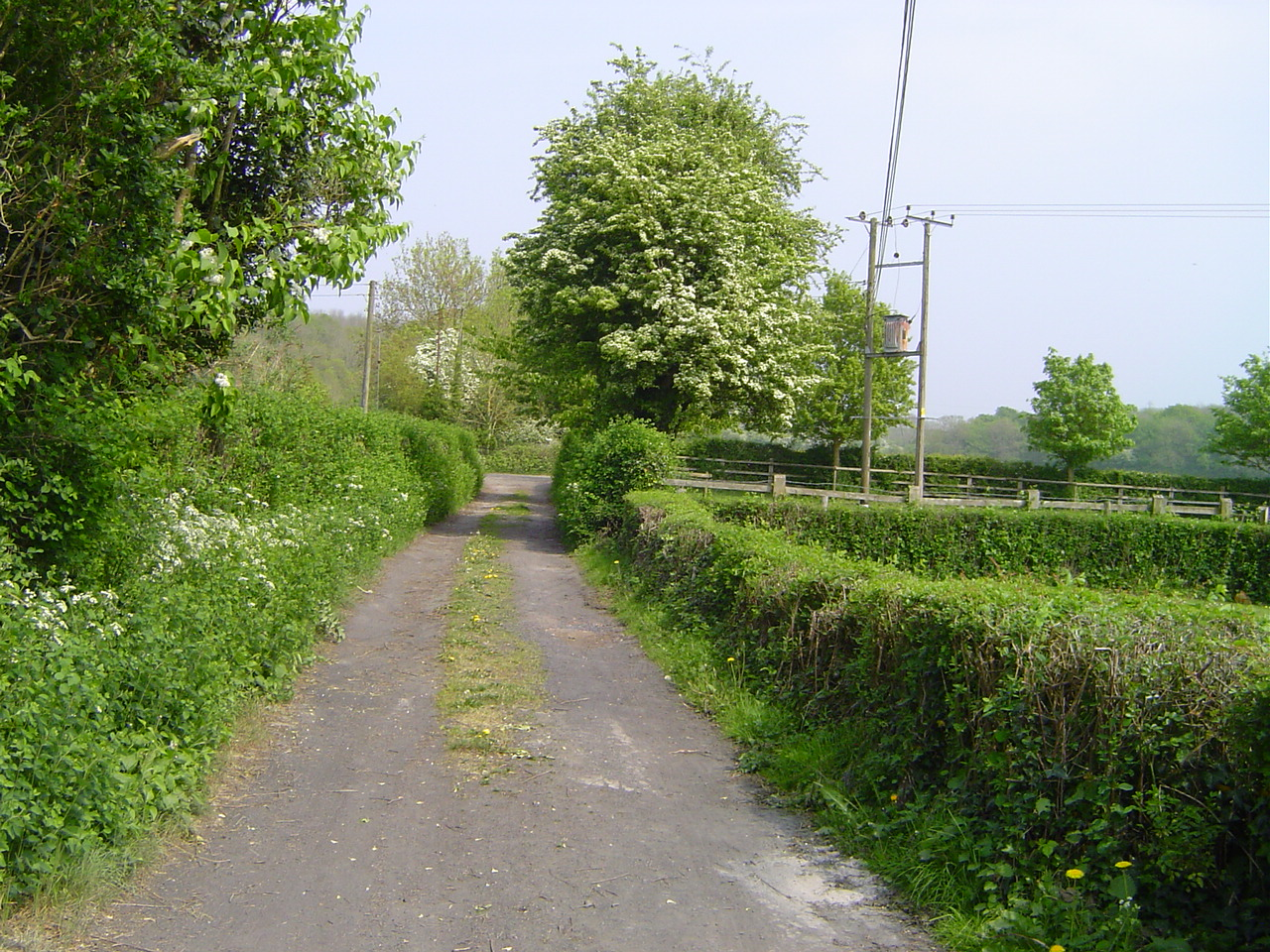
Bitterwell Close – a former railway siding

The final coal mine closed in 1949, at which point Henfield was a clustered hamlet surrounded by pastoral agricultural land. During the second half of the 20th century, Henfield gained some ribbon development along the convergent minor roads, and the M4 Motorway was constructed to the south of the hamlet. The expansion of Bristol and Yate gave Henfield a new role as a commuter satellite.

=== Coal mines ===
Henfield is situated near the centre of the North Bristol Coal Field, this area at one time having been a prolific coal mining community. Coal had been mined in this area since the 14th century and most likely even earlier. However it was Sir Samuel Astry, Lord of the Manor of Westerleigh c1680 who started mining on a grander scale and his descendants, or their business partners, continued to be connected with the Coalpit Heath Colliery Company.

Within Henfield itself there were four mines operational in the early 19th century:

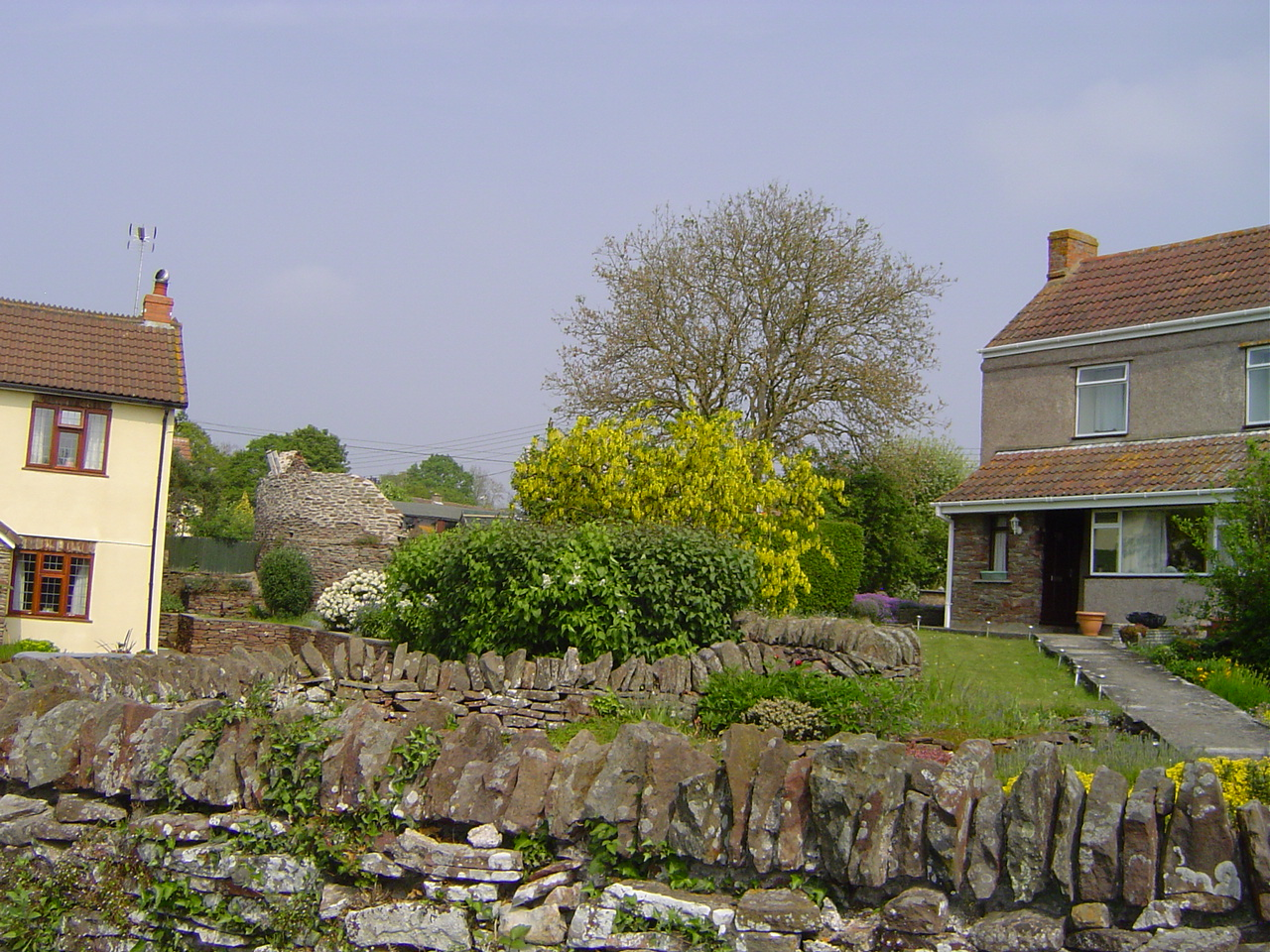
A relic from the hamlet's industrial past between the two dwellings.

- Serridge Engine Pit – was sunk in 1785 and located near to Serridge House. This mine was linked by an early tramway to the old Ram Hill pit.
- Orchard (or Middle Wimsey) Pit – was opened in the late eighteenth century and was active at the time the Dramway was completed in 1832 but was superseded by the New Engine Pit soon afterwards.
- No. 11 Pit – little is known of this pit other than its location south of the above pits.
- New Engine Pit was sunk around 1824 and was the only one of the Henfield pits that was still operational after 1867. It had a depth of 502 ft 10ins which at that time was recorded as the deepest shaft sunk in the trough of Coalpit Heath. In the mid-nineteenth century New Engine Pit was the main pit for the Coalpit Heath group of mines. Most coal for this area was drawn from this pit, the other shafts being kept open for pumping and ventilation. On the New Engine Pit site today there are the remains of a horse gin and an engine house, while the area itself is called New Engine. In 1930 it was recorded that there was an 1832 Acraman steam engine at the New Engine colliery site that was being used to drive a saw mill. However, there is no trace of this engine today.

The population increased at the beginning of the 19th century, supported by the introduction of new miners' cottages by the Coalpit Heath Colliery Company. The closure of New Engine Pit, the remaining mine, before the end of the 19th century represented change but with railway sidings and engine shed at New Engine and the movement of labour to the nearby Parkfield and Frog Lane Pits, the industrial nature of the area was maintained to well into the twentieth century. Frog Lane Pit at Coalpit Heath closed in 1949.

The underground map of around 1850 shows that the underground roads of the nearby Ram Hill Colliery and Churchleaze pits on Ram Hill joined with those of the Serridge Engine and New Engine pits.

=== Bristol and Gloucestershire Railway ===
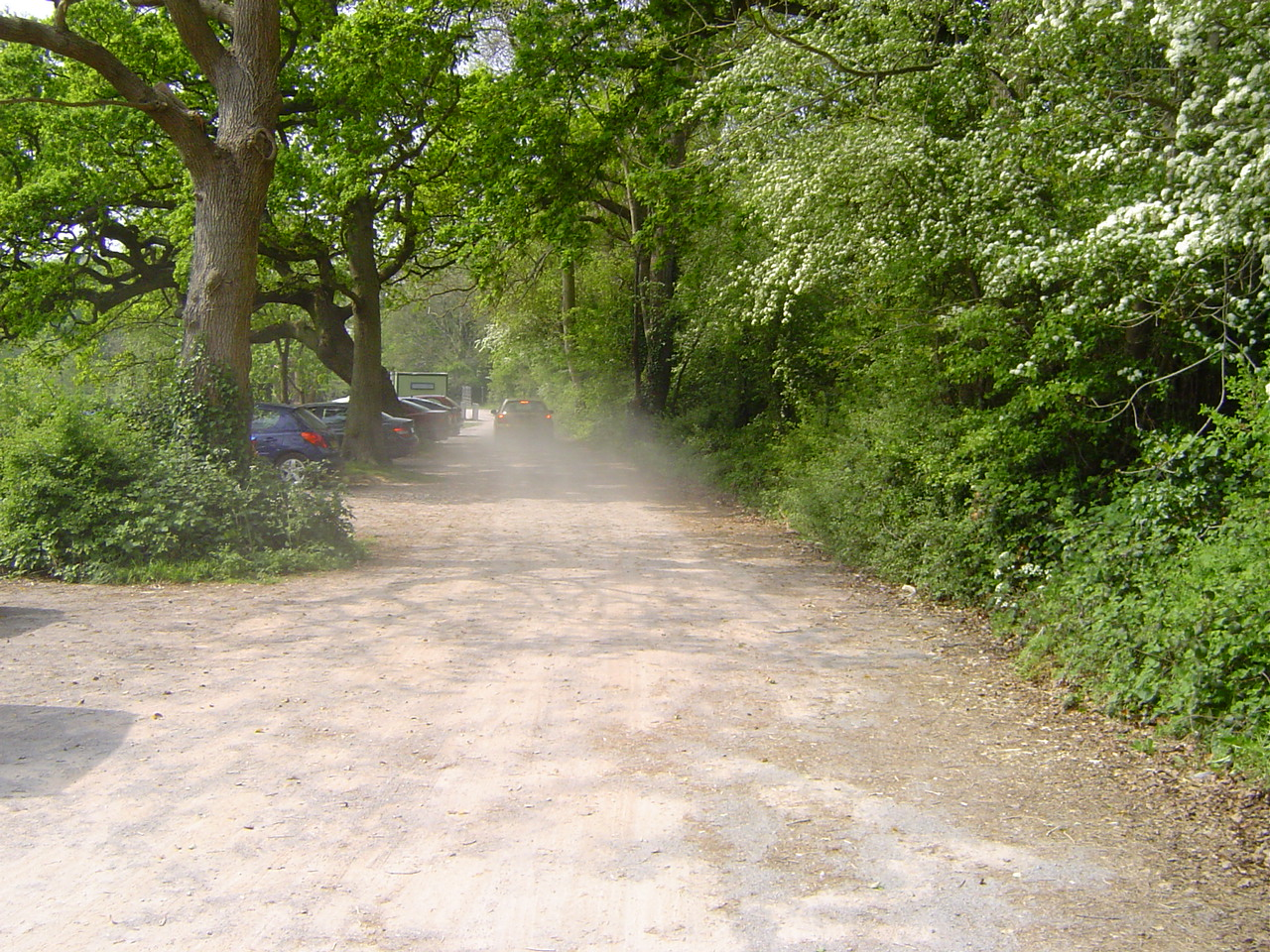
Access track to Bitterwell Lake car park was at one time part of the dramway to Ram Hill Colliery.

In the Bristol and Gloucester Railway Act 1828 (9 Geo. 4. c. xciii) of 19 June 1828, parliament authorised the construction of a horse-drawn railway from Ram Hill to the River Avon in Bristol. It was completed and in use by July 1832. At the same time the Avon and Gloucestershire Railway constructed a connecting line from near Mangotsfield to the River Avon at Keynsham.

The Ram Hill Colliery was the northern terminus and near of Bitterwell Lake, a colliery drainage sump, there was also a southern spur to New Engine Pit; technical facilities were provided there and it served as a supply depot to other local pits. When New Engine Pit ceased extraction itself, the support facilities continued in use, and it came to be named New Engine Yard.

These early railways provided cheap and easy transport from the mines of Coalpit Heath to the wharves on the Avon at Keynsham and Bristol. They were built as single track railway, built to the gauge of 4 ft 8 in gauge, with passing places along the route. The whole length of the railway was built on a down hill gradient dropping 225 ft along the route.

The railways were colloquially referred to as the dramway and in recent times this has been formalised by usage on signs indicating the footpath facilities, and on Ordnance Survey mapping.

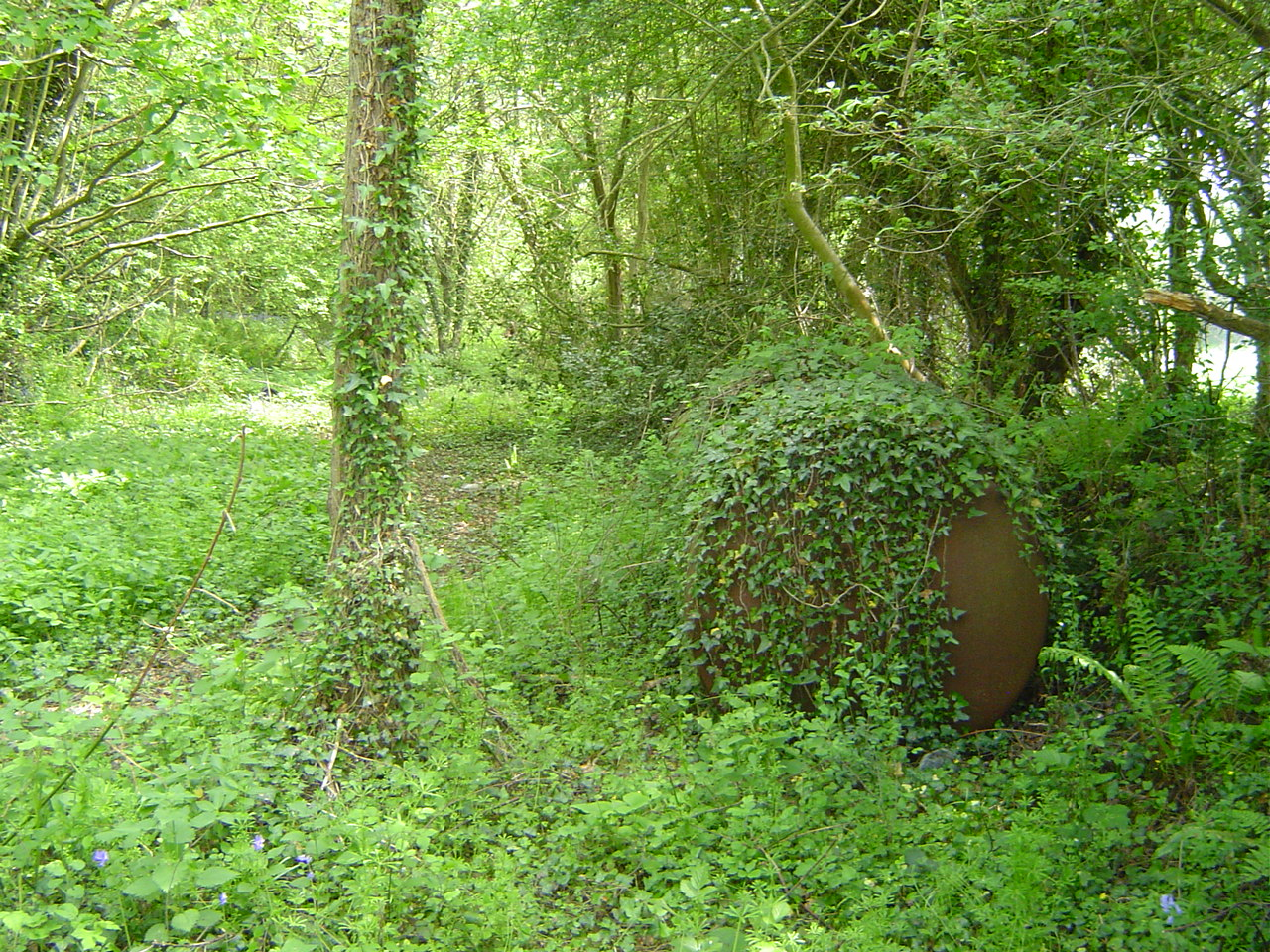
Disused railway line near Bitterwell Lake – now heavily overgrown.

In 1839 a main line railway, the Bristol and Gloucester Railway obtained its act of parliament; this authorised it to take over the Bristol and Gloucestershire line, and to make a main line railway to Gloucester. The railway was to be on Brunel's broad gauge and required the colliery lines to be converted too. It opened on 5 June 1844. The Coalpit Heath group of pits had by then declined, and the line to them beyond New Engine Yard was not converted.

In around 1860 a northern branch was constructed near Boxhedge Farm that served the new Frog Lane Colliery at Coalpit Heath. Following the closure of the New Engine Pit towards the end of the nineteenth century, railway infrastructure at Henfield remained in the form of railway sidings and engine shed. These served the Frog Lane Colliery until its closure in 1949. Some dilapidated built remnants of the railway remain including the old engine shed at New Engine Yard and weighbridge house near Boxhedge Farm.

== Community facilities ==
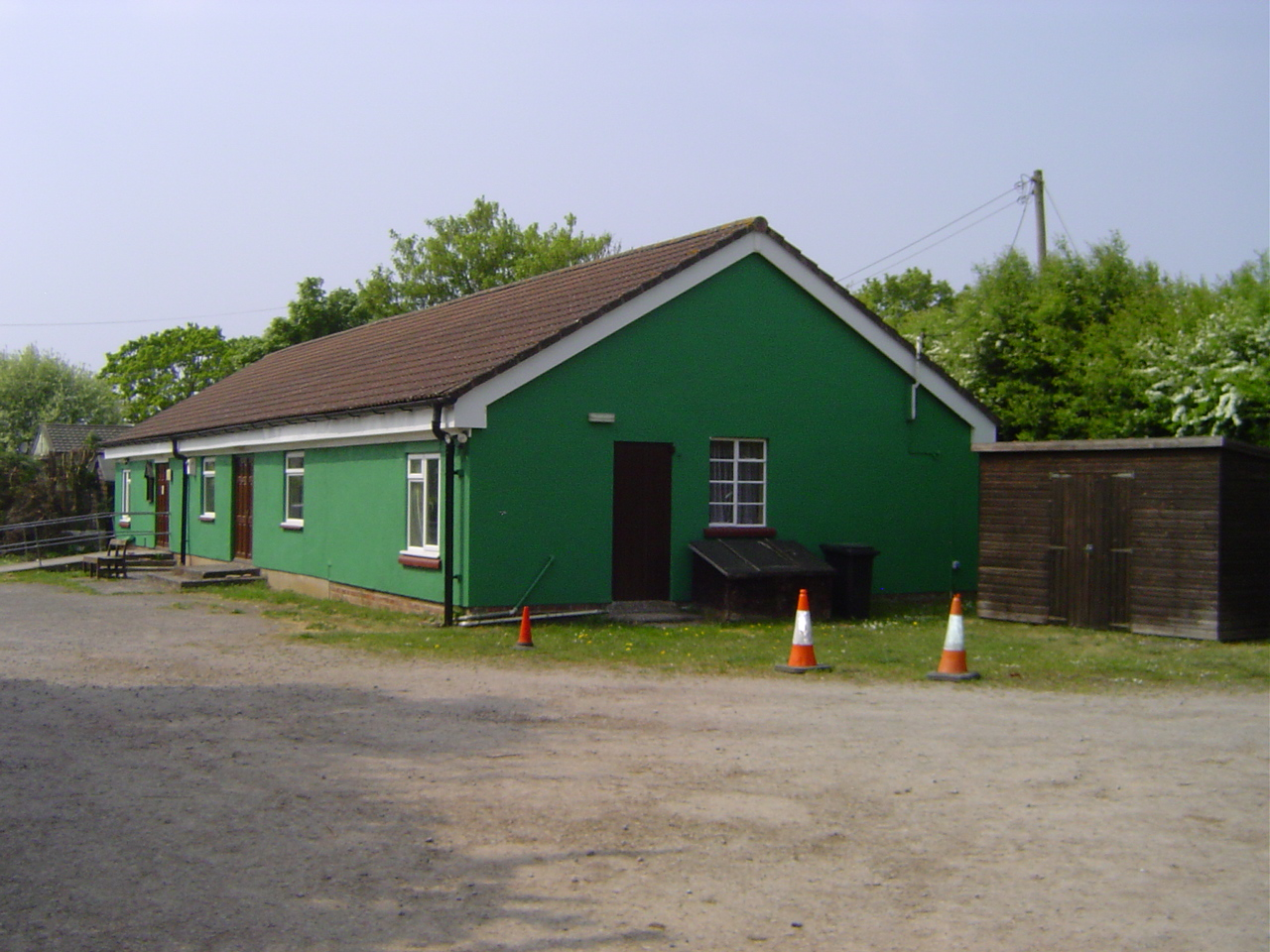
Henfield Village Hall

Parish council records indicate that deeds were received in 1948 for land next to Bitterwell Lake to be used for a new village hall for the residents of the Henfield and New Engine. By the 1960s the village hall represented an important facility in the small community with Saturday dances, whist drives, youth club meetings, jumble sales as well as being a setting for the annual village shows. The hall has been modernised and is now known as the Henfield Social Club and is available for hire for a range of activities and private functions.

Newman Field is a small recreation area is next to the village hall and Bitterwell Lake. The land was donated by Jo Newman to the community in 1974.

== Governance ==
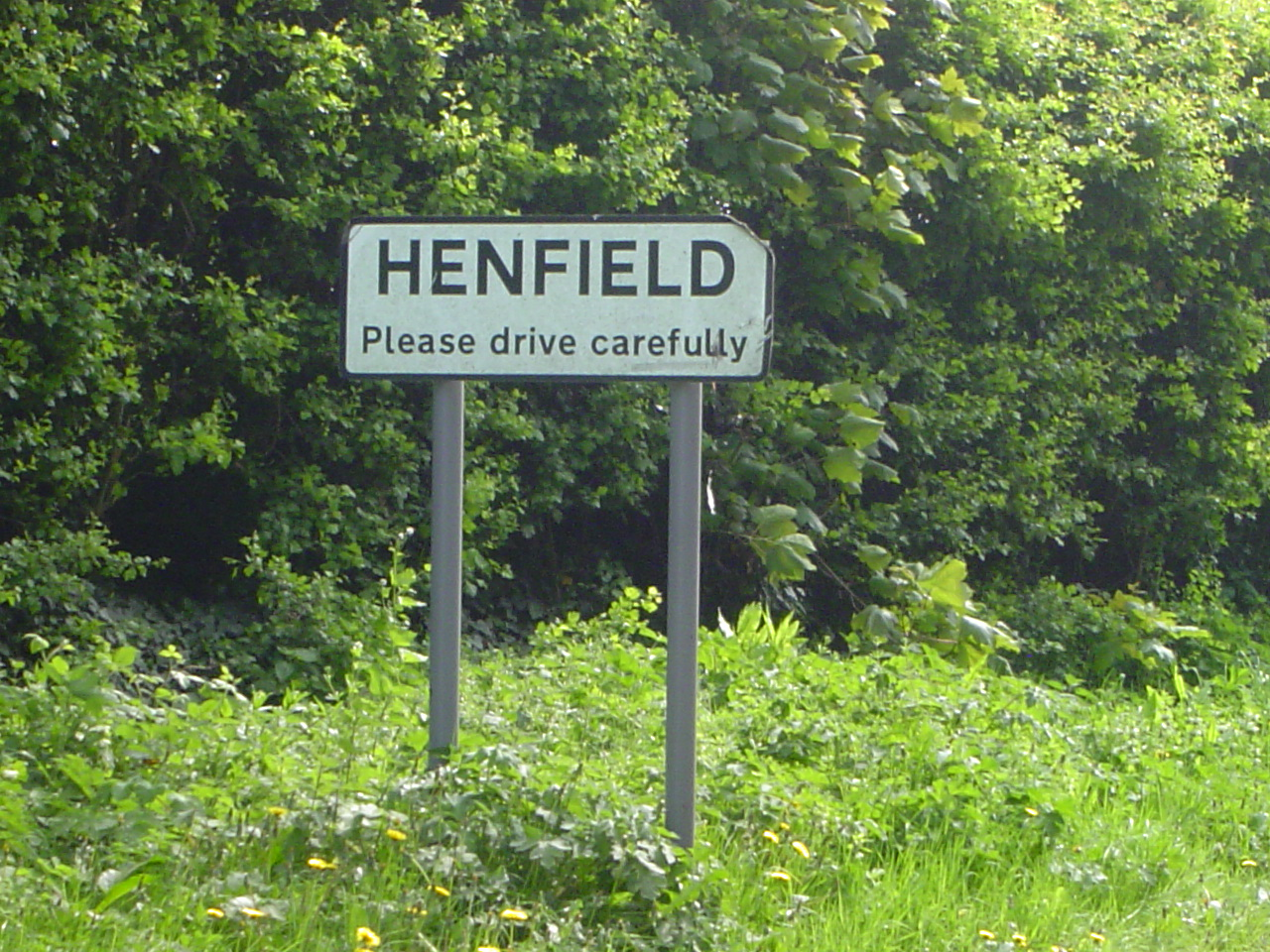
Henfield sign

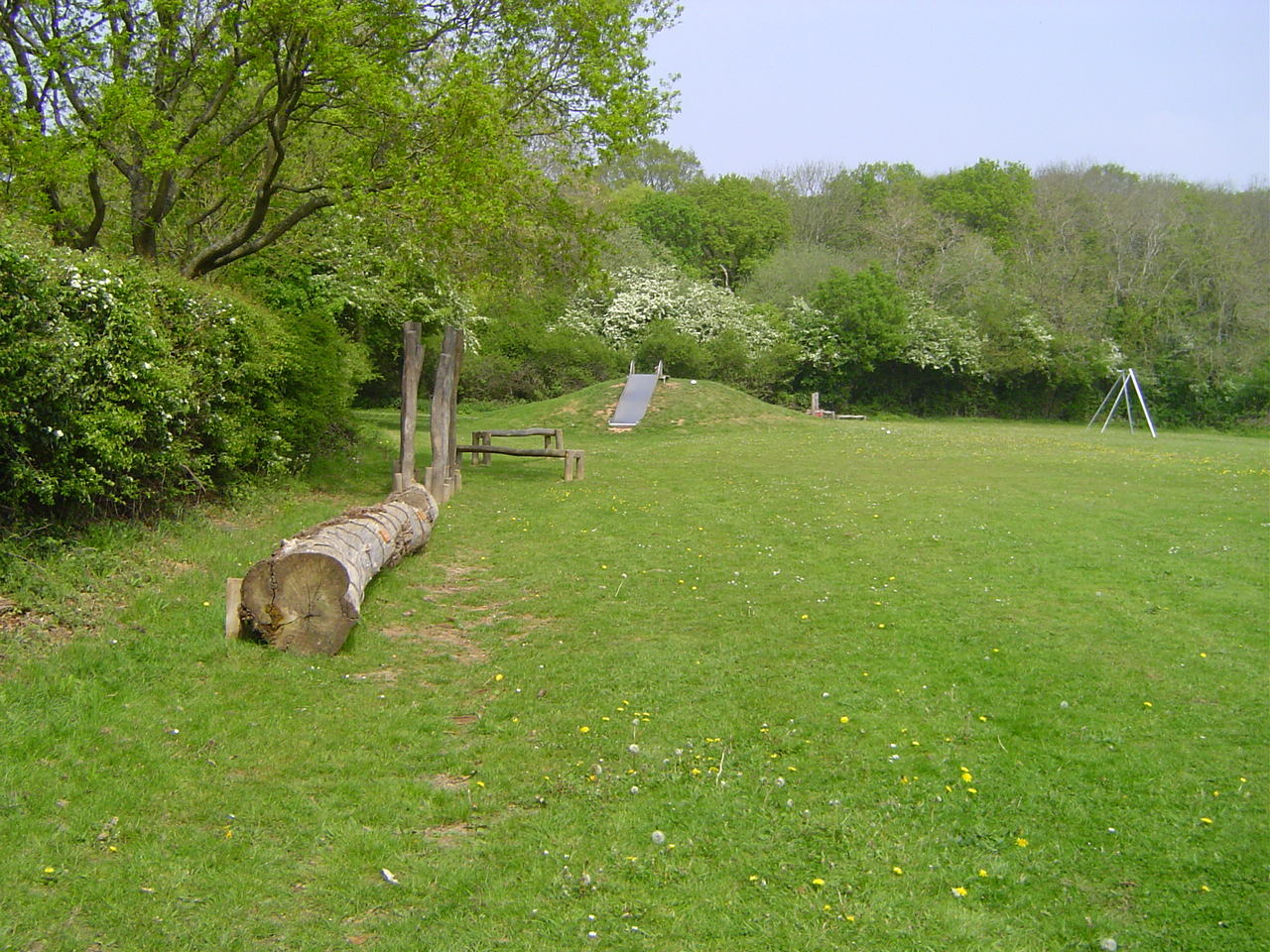
Play area at Newman Field

The two tiers of local government that are responsible for administering Henfield are:

- South Gloucestershire Council
- Westerleigh Parish Council

In the adopted South Gloucestershire Local Plan, Henfield does not have a defined settlement boundary on the proposals map and there are no sites allocated for new residential development.

The hamlet is within an area defined as green belt and is located within the Forest of Avon area. There are also major recreational routes in the hamlet.

== Environment ==
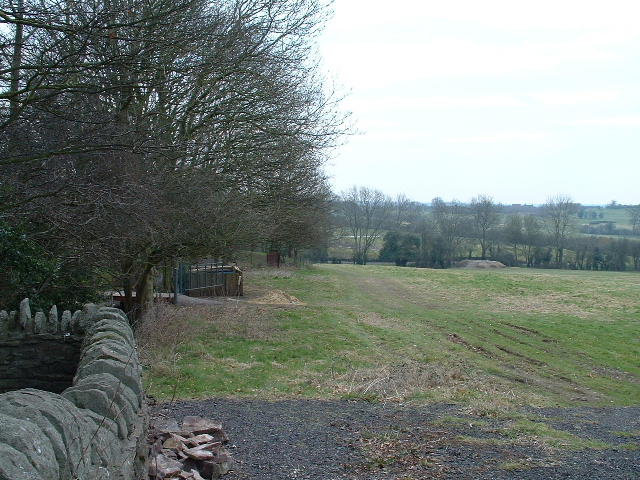
Fields adjacent to Serridge House

Two areas of Broadleaved Woodland in Henfield are identified by South Gloucestershire Council as Sites of Nature Conservation Importance:

- Martin Croft Brake
- Branch Pool Wood.

== Sport and recreation ==
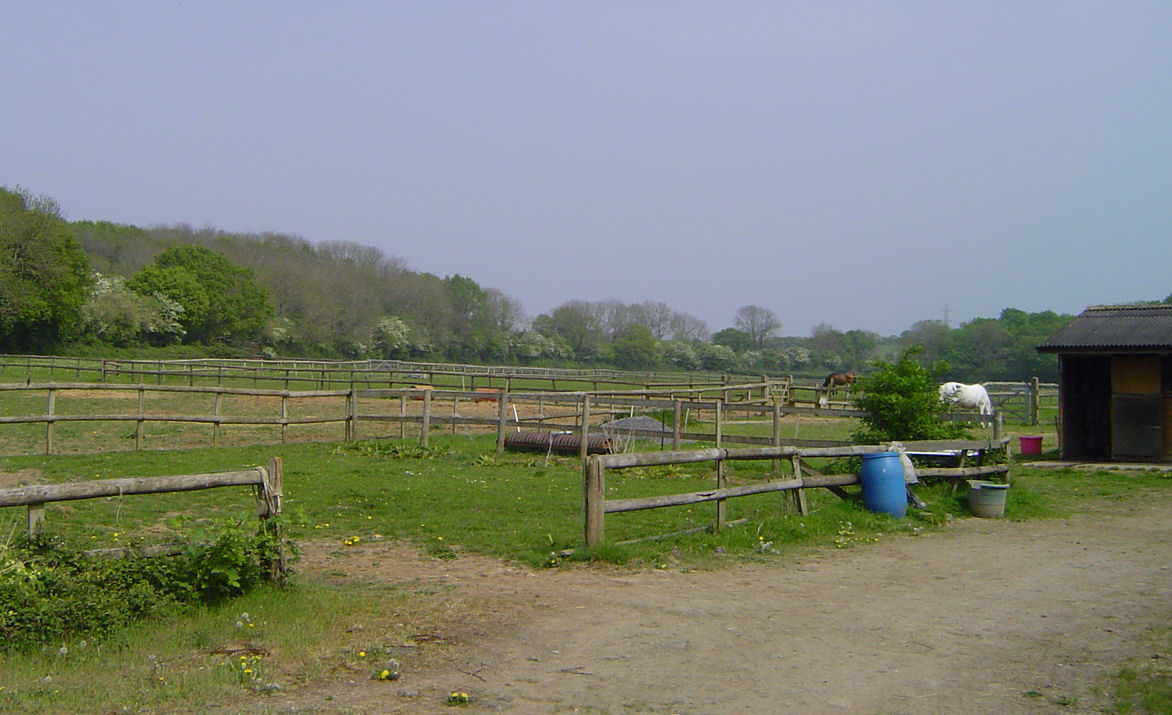
Former ground of Henfield Youth AFC

Henfield Youth AFC was a football club based in the hamlet from 1960 until 1972. At the outset the club played friendly matches before joining the Bristol Church of England League in 1961 and progressing from Division 4 to Division 1 of the league before spending their last few seasons in Division 2. Players who passed through the club's ranks over the 12-year period included Gordon Bennett and Howard Radford.

== Transport ==
Henfield is served by one bus service:

- 686: Chipping Sodbury – Yate – Henfield – Mangotsfield – Kingswood (supported by South Gloucestershire Council)
