= Art Skidmore =

Canadian football player (1922–2012)

Profile
- Positions: Halfback, Punter

Personal information
- Born: August 20, 1922
- Died: December 4, 2012 (aged 90); Trenton, Ontario, Canada
- Listed height: 6 ft 0 in (1.83 m)

Career history
- 1945–1948: Toronto Argonauts

Awards and highlights
- Grey Cup champion (1945, 1946, 1947)

Arthur Benjamin Skidmore (August 10, 1922 – December 4, 2012) was a Canadian professional football player who played for the Toronto Argonauts. He won the Grey Cup with them in 1945, 1946 and 1947.
