= Skis.com =

- Company type: Private company
- Industry: E-tail
- Founded: 2005
- Headquarters: Pottstown, PA
- Products: Skis, Ski Clothing, and other Gear
- Website: www.skis.com/

Skis.com is an online outdoor retailer that specializes in gear for skiing, snowboarding, and ski clothing.

== History ==
Skis.com was founded by Steve Kopitz and was launched in 2005. Summit Sports Inc., parent company of the site has been in the skiing industry since 1990.

The site sells both high-end and closeout merchandise.

Skis was named in the 2009 Internetretailer.com "Hot 100" sites.

In June 2015, Skis.com was acquired by Digital Fuel Capital, a private equity firm specializing in e-commerce investments.

== Ski-O-Pedia ==
The site also provides videos, articles, buying guides and sizing charts for selection of skis. The videos offered include "how-to-buy" tutorials and reviews of the products.
