= James Skidmore =

James Skidmore may refer to:

- James Skidmore (courtier)
- James Skidmore (musician)

== See also ==
- James Scudamore (disambiguation)
