= Nibley, South Gloucestershire =

Village in Westerleigh, South Gloucestershire, England

Coordinates: 51.54°N 2.44°W

Nibley
- Location within Gloucestershire
- OS grid reference: ST693822
- Civil parish: Westerleigh
- Unitary authority: South Gloucestershire
- Ceremonial county: Gloucestershire
- Region: South West
- Country: England
- Sovereign state: United Kingdom
- Post town: BRISTOL
- Postcode district: BS36
- Dialling code: 01454
- Police: Avon and Somerset
- Fire: Avon
- Ambulance: South Western
- UK Parliament: Thornbury and Yate

Nibley is a village in the parish of Westerleigh, South Gloucestershire, England; it is situated about 1.5 miles (2.4 km) west of Yate.

The village of North Nibley (also commonly known as Nibley) is some 10 miles (16 km) away to the north, and there is also a Nibley on the west bank of the Severn, near Lydney.
