= Coalpit Heath =

Village in South Gloucestershire, England

Coordinates: 51.526°N 2.47°W

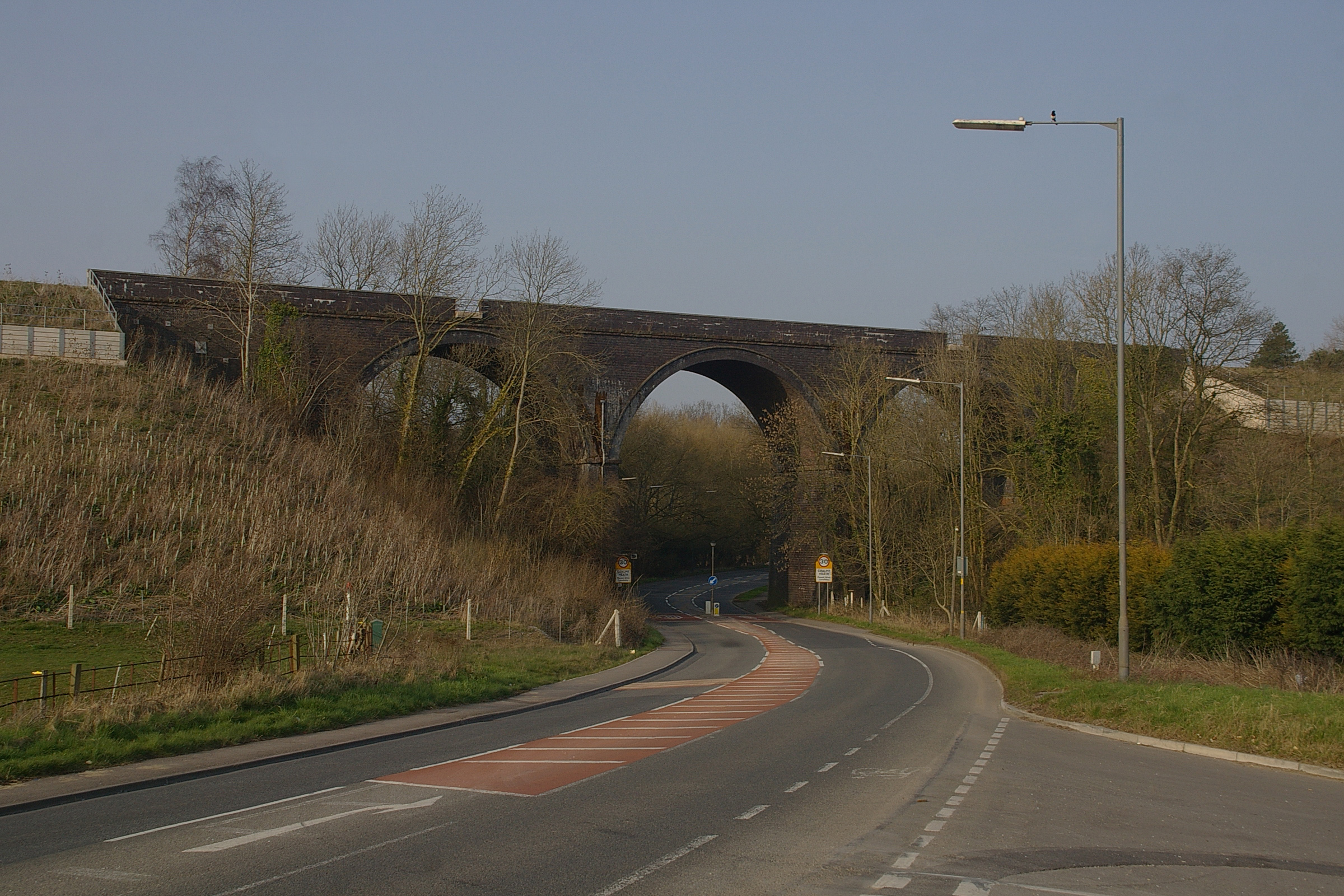
- The South Wales Main Line viaduct at Coalpit Heath

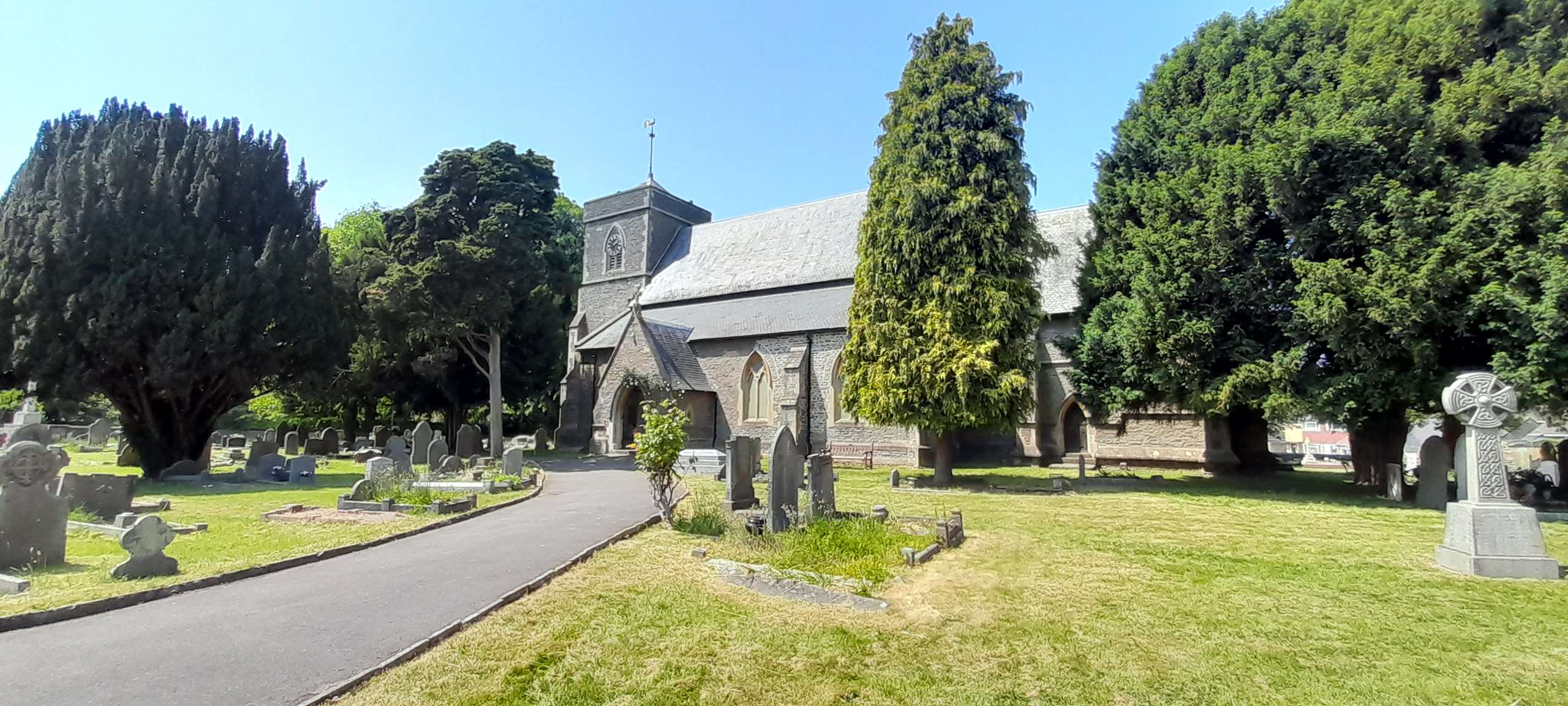
- St Saviours Church, Coalpit Heath

- Location within Gloucestershire
- Population: 1,886 (2011 census)
- OS grid reference: ST675806
- Civil parish: Westerleigh and Coalpit Heath
- Unitary authority: South Gloucestershire
- Ceremonial county: Gloucestershire
- Region: South West
- Country: England
- Sovereign state: United Kingdom
- Post town: Bristol
- Postcode district: BS36
- Dialling code: 01454
- Police: Avon and Somerset
- Fire: Avon
- Ambulance: South Western
- UK Parliament: Thornbury and Yate

Coalpit Heath is a small village in the civil parish of Westerleigh and Coalpit Heath, in South Gloucestershire, England, south of Yate. Frampton Cotterell lies along the northwest border.

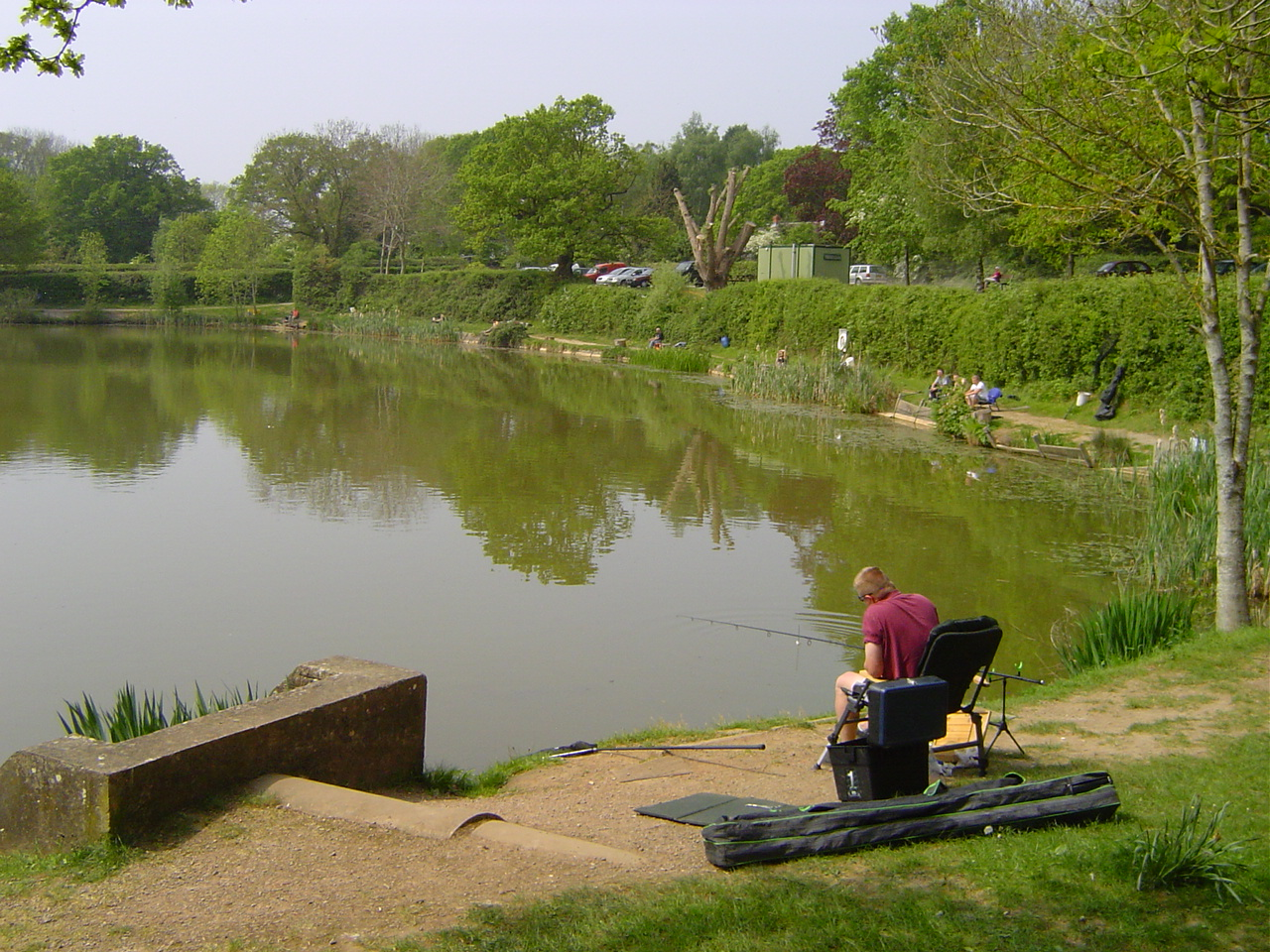
Bitterwell Lake at Henfield

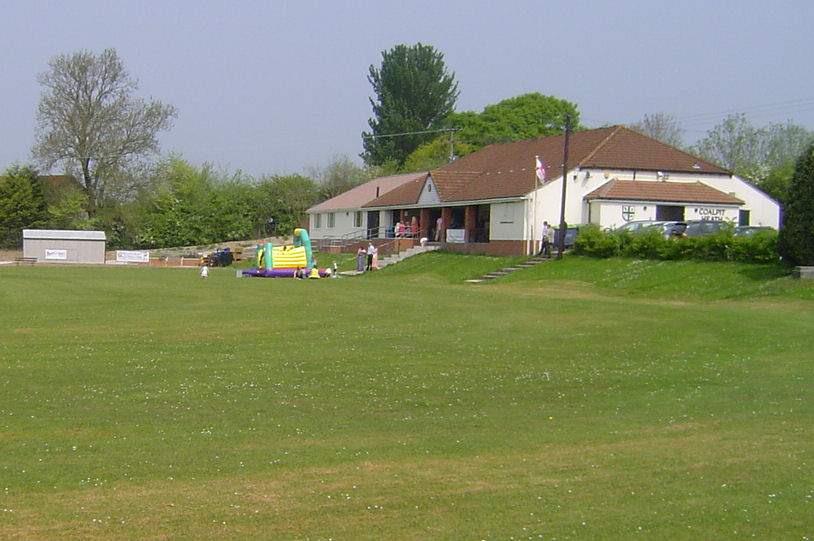
Coalpit Heath Cricket Club at Ram Hill

The village contains three pubs, a post office, and a primary school. St Saviour's parish church was designed by William Butterfield in 1844 and was his first Anglican Church. Other amenities include Bitterwell Lake at Henfield, Coalpit Heath Cricket Club at Ram Hill, and a 27-hole golf course (The Kendleshire).

== History ==
The village was founded as a coal mining settlement. One pit was on Frog Lane at ST 685 815 (to the north east of the village). Other mines operated between Mayshill and Nibley to the north and at Ram Hill and Henfield to the south. These were served by a railway line, closed some decades ago and no longer visible on the ground. In 1949 the coal ran out. When the Kendleshire golf course was built, the remains of many bell pits were found.

== In literature ==
A number of sources, including Frank Barrett's book Where Was Wonderland? A Traveller's Guide to the Settings of Classic Children's Books, cite Coalpit Heath as the setting for the Dick King Smith children's book The Sheep-Pig, later adapted for film as Babe.

The South Gloucestershire Mines Research Group have written two books on Coalpit Heath and the surrounding area, including Frog Lane and Kingswood Coal.
