= Westerleigh =

Village in Gloucestershire, England

Coordinates: 51.51°N 2.43°W

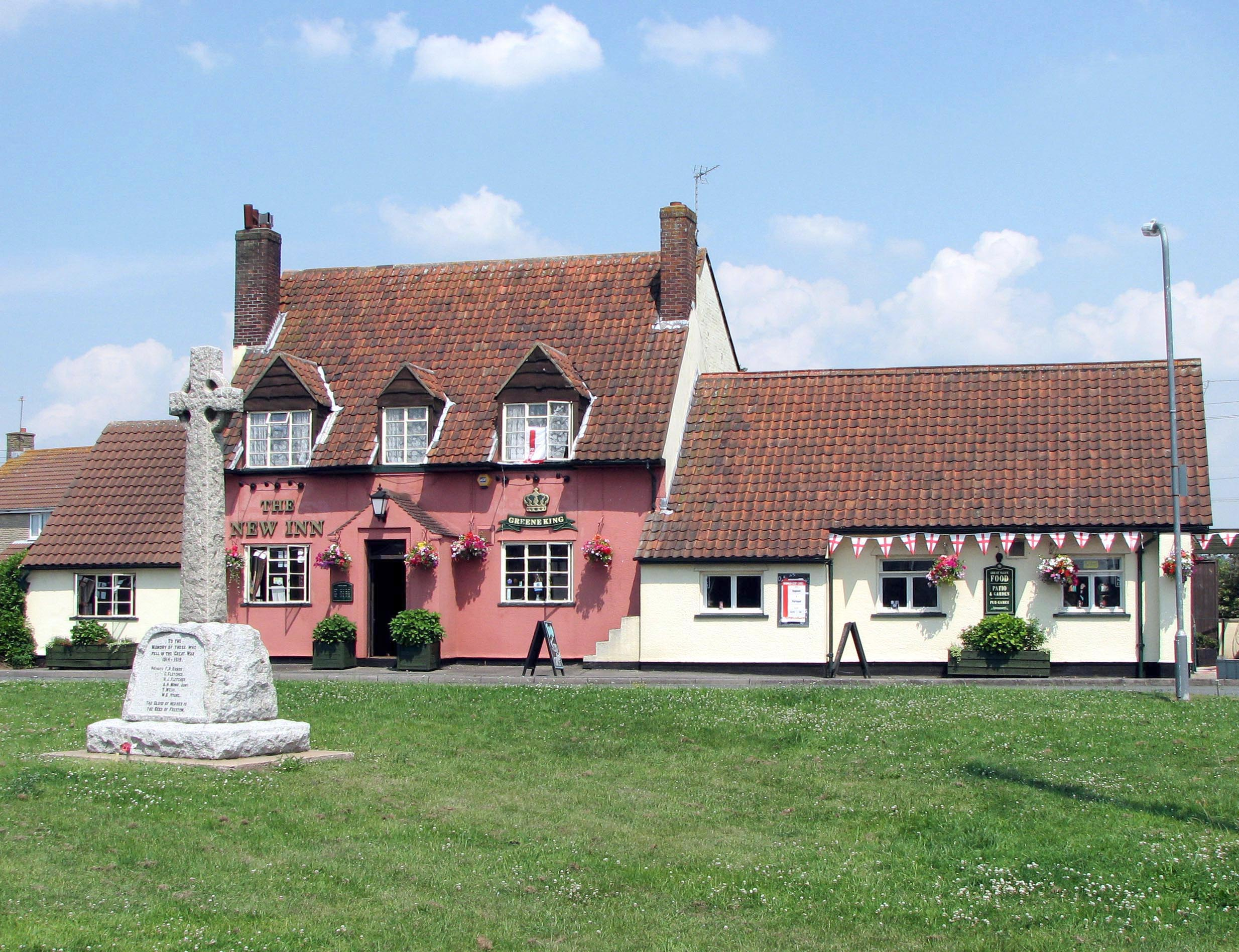
- The New Inn, Westerleigh

- Location within Gloucestershire
- Population: 3,399 (2011)
- OS grid reference: ST670818
- Civil parish: Westerleigh and Coalpit Heath
- Unitary authority: South Gloucestershire
- Ceremonial county: Gloucestershire
- Region: South West
- Country: England
- Sovereign state: United Kingdom
- Post town: Bristol
- Postcode district: BS36, BS37
- Dialling code: 01454
- Police: Avon and Somerset
- Fire: Avon
- Ambulance: South Western
- UK Parliament: Thornbury and Yate

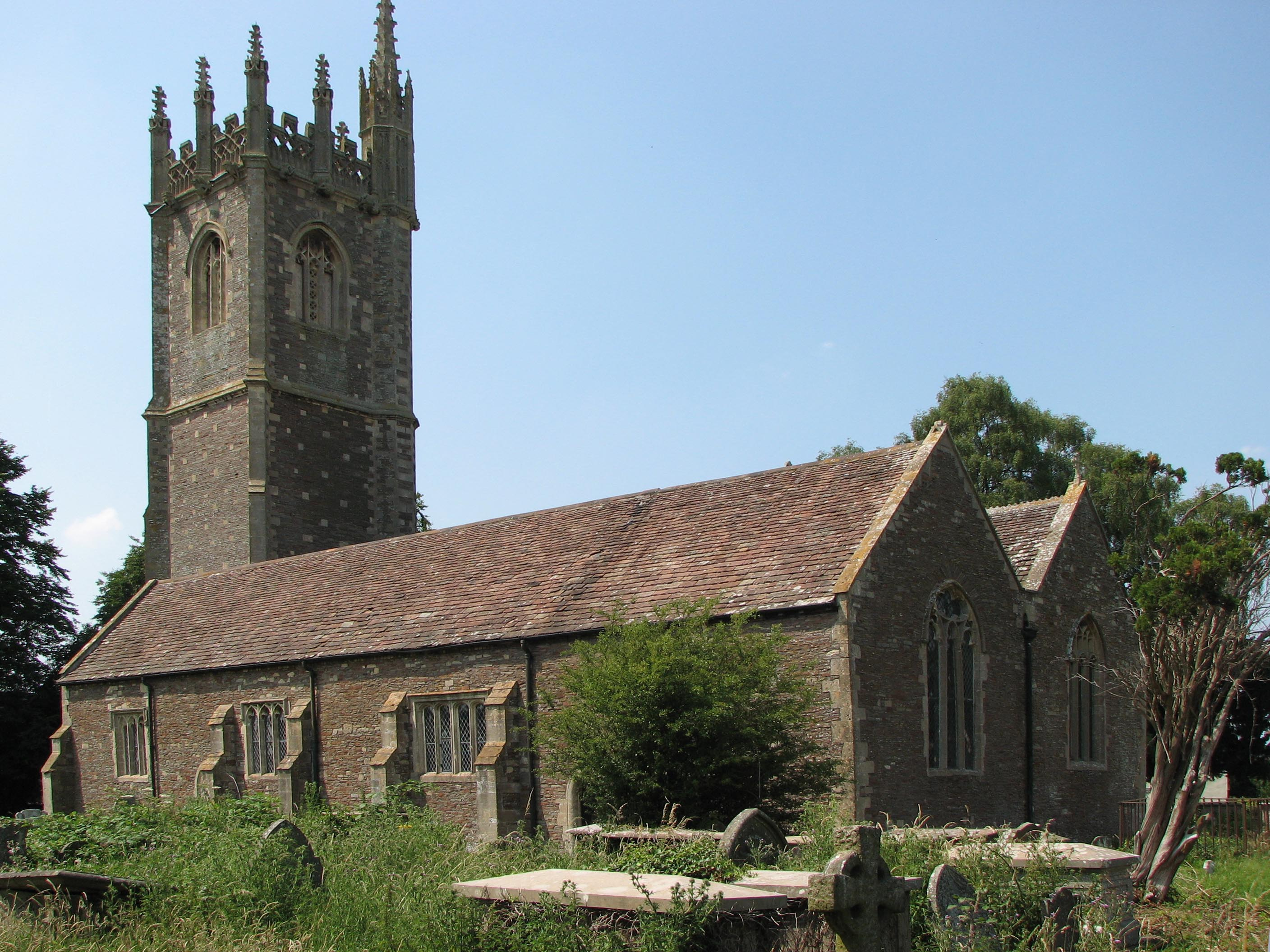
The church of Saint James the Great, Westerleigh

Westerleigh is a clustered village in the civil parish of Westerleigh and Coalpit Heath (which includes Henfield) in the South Gloucestershire district, in the ceremonial county of Gloucestershire, England, it contains sources of the Frome and has an endpoint of the Frome Valley Walkway. It is 0.8 miles (1.3 km) north of the M4, 1 mile (1.6 km) south of Yate and 10 miles (16 km) northeast of Bristol. In the south it includes a steep hill of its own 5 miles (8.0 km) from the crest of the Cotswold hills which is designated an AONB.

== History ==
Westerleigh is not recorded by name in the Domesday Book (1086). Westerleigh emerges as a chapelry of the very large estate of Pucklechurch, which before being granted to Glastonbury Abbey in the 10th century, had been a royal manor. The place-name means 'the more westerly clearing', probably in relation either to the Sodburys or Dodington. The second element of the name, which is Old English lēah, can also have a meaning of 'wood pasture; meadow'. A house specifically for the occupation of the chaplain serving the church at Westerleigh had been established at least by the end of the 14th century.

As it appears on the earliest available maps, Westerleigh had a loose agglomeration, clustered around a central, roughly triangular nexus where three lanes meet – heading northwards, south-westwards and south-eastwards out of the main area of occupation. The church occupies a prominent site on the southern side of what is now a small, triangular, open green space. The likelihood is that the church was not a proprietary foundation, but was perhaps established by Glastonbury Abbey in the course of its tenure of the Pucklechurch estate, which it gave up in the early 13th century to the See of Wells.

The northern wall and porch of St James church are from the 13th century, as the carved stone pulpit. The church was rebuilt in the Perpendicular style, with the tower (once used as the village lock-up), added at a later date. The 700th anniversary was celebrated in 2004.

By 1600, the village supported a shoemaker, a blacksmith, a sawyer, a flour mill, a malt house, and two public houses. In 1617, John Crandall was baptised to James and Eleanor Crandall at St. James the Great church, and became one of the founders of Westerly, Rhode Island, United States.

The discovery of coal in 1660 provided employment for the villagers, with further finds at Coalpit Heath and Parkfield providing more employment. The mines closed in the last century, when the coal was exhausted.

By 1876 occupations in the village included farmers, a bootmaker, shopkeepers, innkeepers, butchers, a plasterer, a blacksmith, a wheelwright, a market gardener and a carrier. At the end of the 19th century many of the old houses were demolished. At the beginning of the 20th century, the railway and mining provided most of the work. Now residents find work in nearby Yate, Chipping Sodbury and Bristol, and in the village itself.

== Governance ==
An electoral ward in the same name exists. This ward stretches from Dodington in the east, through 'Westerleigh'. The total population for the ward at the 2011 census was 3,755. On 1 April 2023 the parish was renamed from "Westerleigh" to "Westerleigh and Coalpit Heath".

== Amenities ==
The village has two public houses: the New Inn and Ye Olde Inn. As well as Wot Not second-hand shop, and two garages. The village shop has now closed.

== Transport ==
In the late 18th century roads were built to Downend. The Great Western and Midland Railways were constructed in the 19th century. Westerleigh Junction was a crossing point of east-west and north-south main lines. In particular it is considered to be the present end of the line from milepost zero at Derby. Westerleigh formerly had a goods depot on the Bristol & Gloucester Railway. Demolished in the 1960s as part of the Beeching cuts, the site is now the home of one of Murco's oil storage terminals.

Westerleigh is served by the WESTlink on-demand bus, available to the public Monday-Saturday.
