= Luckington =

Village in Wiltshire, England

Coordinates: 51.554°N 2.242°W

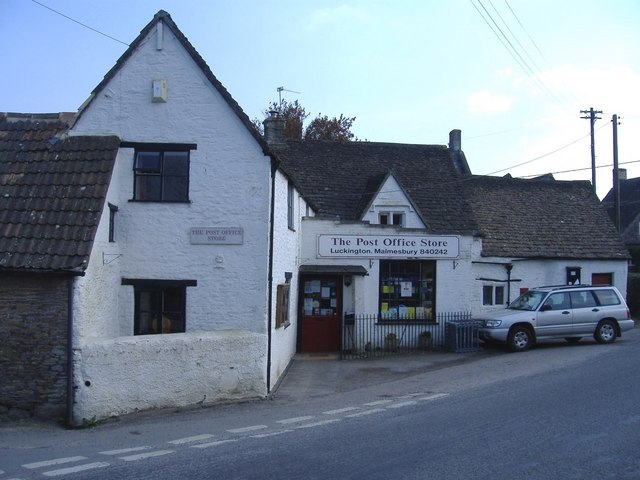
- Post office, Luckington

- Location within Wiltshire
- Population: 630 (in 2011)
- OS grid reference: ST833839
- Civil parish: Luckington
- Unitary authority: Wiltshire
- Ceremonial county: Wiltshire
- Region: South West
- Country: England
- Sovereign state: United Kingdom
- Post town: Chippenham
- Postcode district: SN14
- Dialling code: 01666
- Police: Wiltshire
- Fire: Dorset and Wiltshire
- Ambulance: South Western
- UK Parliament: South Cotswolds
- Website: Parish council

Luckington is a village and civil parish in the southern Cotswolds, in northwest Wiltshire, England, about 6 1/2 miles (10 km) west of Malmesbury. The village is on the B4040 road linking Malmesbury and Chipping Sodbury. The parish is on the county border with Gloucestershire and includes the village of Alderton and the hamlet of Brook End.

== Geography ==
The Cotswolds are designated as an Area of Outstanding Natural Beauty (AONB) which means it is recognised as containing some of Britain's finest countryside. As such it is protected as a special landscape of national importance. The area covers 790 square miles, of which some 80% is farmland. The region is delineated by the belt of rich limestone – the source of building materials for cottages, fine buildings and churches. The limestone Cotswold stone in the northern Cotswolds is a rich honey coloured brown which gradually grades creamier towards the south at Luckington.

Badminton House is just across the county border, about 1 3/4 miles (2.8 km) southwest of Luckington village. Parkland of the Badminton estate extends a short distance into Luckington parish.

In a valley to the south of the village, seasonal springs are the source of the Bristol Avon. The Avon, from Luckington, passes through Malmesbury and Chippenham towards Bath and Bristol. The 17th-century writer John Aubrey was probably referring to one of these springs when he wrote: "In this village is a fine spring called Hancock's-well… It cures the itch and Scabbe; it hath done much good to the eies," and again the editor Jackson adds: "Hancock's well is still resorted to for the cure of sick dogs, bad legs and the like". J H P Pafford et al. tell us that at the time of writing the well still had the reputation of being good for the eyes. Hancock's well still flows strongly in its stone culvert down to the river close by.

== History ==
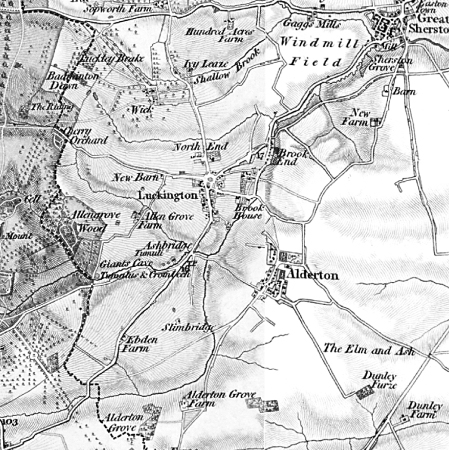
Ordnance Survey map, 1817–1830 series

Evidence of Neolithic settlement includes Giant's Cave, a chambered long barrow in the west of the parish. The Fosse Way Roman road forms part of the parish boundary in the southeast. Five roads meet at Luckington, principally the former Oxford-Bristol road via Malmesbury and Sherston.

The Domesday Book of 1086 recorded two manors with 21 households at Lochintone and two manors with 15 households at Aldritone. From 1141 until the 14th century, the manor of Luckington was held by the Earls of Hereford; from the 17th century until the early 19th it was owned by a Fitzherbert family, who enlarged Luckington Court c.1700.

Alderton was acquired by the Montagu family of Lackham, then bought in 1827 by Joseph Neeld. When the estate was sold in 1966, most was bought by the Duke of Beaufort.

A school was built in Alderton at Joseph Neeld's expense in 1844, some materials coming from the renovation of St Giles' church. In 1858 there were 20–30 children. The school closed in 1923, with pupils transferred to Luckington.

A National School was built in Luckington in 1874, with two classrooms. This school continues as Luckington Community School.

A Primitive Methodist chapel was built in Luckington in 1903 in "tin tabernacle" style, and today is part of the North Wiltshire circuit.

The Badminton railway line was opened across the parish in 1903, running just south of Alderton where it passes through the Alderton Tunnel. The track continues in use as part of the South Wales Main Line, although the local stations – Hullavington was closed in 1965, and Badminton closed in 1968.

== Parish church ==
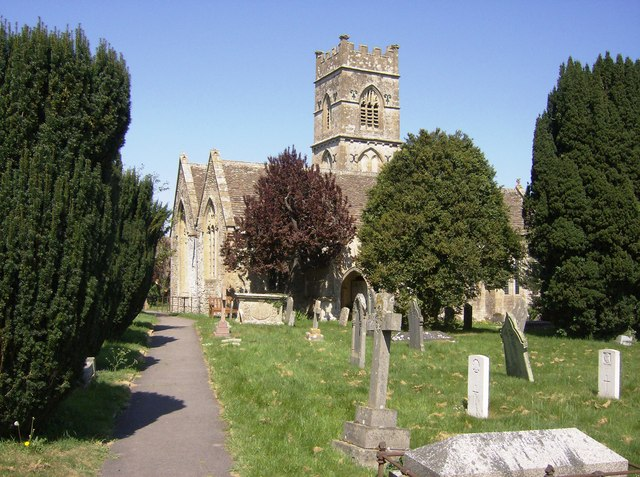
Parish Church

The parish church of St Mary and St Ethelbert dates from c. 1200; the surviving parts from that date include a three-bay arcade and a two-bay arcade to the southeast chapel, both much restored. The lower stages of the tower are from the same century. The tower was completed in the 15th century, and the windows and roof of the nave and aisle are from the same period. Restoration in 1872 by A.W. Blomfield included the rebuilding of the chancel and southeast chapel.

The tower has four bells: one dated c. 1520 and the others from the 17th century. The church was designated as Grade I listed in 1959.

The parish is now one of eight served by the Gauzebrook group ministry.

== Luckington Court ==
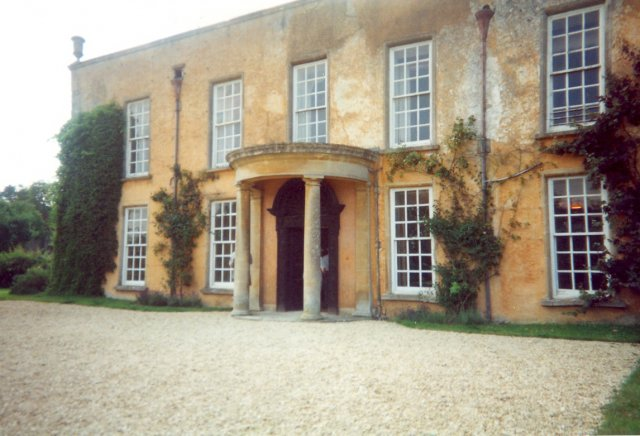
Luckington Court

Luckington Court, close to the parish church, dates from the 16th century. The house has been Grade II* listed building since December 1952. The listing states that it was built ca. 1700 "for H. Fitzherbert, on C16 or earlier core"; the family owned it until the early 1800s. A dovecote may be of the same period. Both the interiors and exterior were used to represent Longbourn, the Bennet family home, in the BBC's 1995 TV series Pride and Prejudice.

An earlier manor on the same site was used by King Harold II as a hunting box, prior to 1066. Some time before the current house was built, there was another house on the site, called Peach House. The current house was enlarged and remodelled in 1921 when it was owned by the Johnson-Ferguson family. The owner in 1995 and in 2013 was Angela Horn, according to published reports.

In addition to the seven-bedroom house with six reception rooms, the property also includes a stable and outbuildings, five cottages and farm buildings.

== Other listed buildings ==
Nearly half the buildings in the parish are Grade II listed. These include the Forge House (c.1700), Manor Farmhouse in Alderton (1676), Witches Cottage (17th century), North End House (1655 and c.1800), Luckington Manor (late 17th), and the Post Office Stores (17th and 18th century). There is also a small village lock-up from the 18th century, in ashlar with a stepped ashlar roof.

== Village life ==
Luckington has a community school with fewer than fifty pupils taught by three full-time teachers and two teaching assistants. There is a children's playground located on Church Road near the Green, run as a charitable organisation. There are good playing fields (one soccer pitch) and a village hall, each run by committees.

The farms which surround Luckington are both dairy and arable; some are owned by the Badminton Estate. The Duke of Beaufort's Hunt and the proximity of Badminton have a bearing on village culture. Luckington holds its own fête each year, usually early in July.

The Old Royal Ship Inn is a popular village pub with walkers and cyclists, and the Beaufort Hunt meets there occasionally.

== Notable people ==
- Sir Stewart Menzies (1890–1968) was Chief of MI6 (SIS) during and after the Second World War, and on whom Ian Fleming based "M" of James Bond fame. In the 1920s he acquired Bridges Court, an 18th-century Grade II-listed Cotswold stone farmhouse, set in 30 acres adjoining the Badminton Estate. As a Major-General, he was President of the Luckington branch of the British Legion and took the march-past of the Army Cadet Force at a ceremony in April 1948. After the war he retired and died in London in 1968. Now owned by Lady Melville, the 18th.c. Grade II Bridges Court is now a bed & breakfast hotel.
- Guy N Vansittart (1893–1989), younger brother of diplomat Robert Vansittart, 1st Baron Vansittart, was a director of General Motors Ltd on the continent and managed their HQ in London from 1938. He lived at Luckington Court in the 1940s, and was recruited into "Z” Network and the SOE, headed by Claude Dansey. The Z organisation was supposed to operate independently of British embassies and thus avoid the attention of foreign internal security agencies. He moved to London post-war, continuing his career with General Motors and died in 1989.
- Captain F. W. Hartman (1884–1942), together with his wife Dorothy (the former Lady Dalrymple), lived in Luckington Manor between 1939 and 1952. Dorothy also owned Home Farm Pinkney and Cowage Farm Foxley around the same time. Bremilham Church on Cowage Farm, near Malmesbury, Wiltshire, holds the Guinness World Record as the smallest "in service" church in the country. They were directors of Lendrum & Hartman Limited, London, sole concessionaires of imported Buick and Cadillac cars from North America. They supplied King Edward VIII with a custom-built Buick in 1936, which was transported with him by warship to France on his abdication. Captain Hartman died in September 1942. They were close business friends of Guy Vansittart. His widow continued running the company, and in 1953 moved to London and Stumblehole Farm in Surrey. One of the last house guests at Luckington Manor was Charlie Chaplin
- Captain Robert Treeck (1899–?), a Baron and German agent, born in Latvia, who escaped during the October Revolution. He was possibly a member of the pre-war dissident group Schwarze Kapelle. Together with his Chilean wife, Baroness Violetta Schroeders (1920–?), he leased Luckington Manor in 1936. The Manor is immediately adjacent to Menzies' house, Bridges Court. He joined the Duke of Beaufort's Hunt, to which Menzies already belonged, and paid a handsome £150 into the hunt's funds for the 1937–1938 season. Treeck relinquished the lease at the end of the 1938–39 hunt season, and Captain Hartman (see above) took over the lease. Treeck lived a parallel life, as his main country residence was Guilsborough House in Northamptonshire, also leased, where he entertained lavishly and rode with the Pytchley Hunt. In September 1939, Treeck vanished, and Guilsborough and its contents were placed under the control of the Custodian of Enemy Property.
- Actor John Thaw (1942–2002) and his second wife, actress Sheila Hancock, bought the 17th-century Brook House in Church Road in 1990, "...or Lucky, as we called it, a Wiltshire village. John loved it, he hid away in it, curling up and shutting the world out." They lived there on a semi-permanent basis until Thaw's death. Hancock writes in her book, My life with John Thaw: "Today at the Post Office two photographers started snapping at us. John was feeling peaky and just sighed but I was like a wild animal. Luckington has never seen such an unseemly display." The house was sold in 2002 after Thaw's death.
- Basil Harwood (1859–1949), English organist and composer, born in Gloucestershire, was inspired by Luckington when writing the hymn tune of that name, often used for Let all the world in every corner sing, my God and King! The heavens are not too high, his praise may thither fly. The tune features on the album "100 Best Hymns" by the York Minster Choir and is regularly aired on the BBC television programme Songs of Praise.

== Books and further reading ==
- Wiltshire Villages (The Village series), Brian J. Woodruffe, Robert Hale Ltd, 1982, ISBN 0709197454 / 0-7091-9745-4
- Aubrey's Natural History of Wiltshire, John Aubrey, David and Charles Reprints, 1969, ISBN 0715346709
- Wiltshire: Cradle of our Civilisation, Arthur Mee, Hodder and Stoughton, 1939
- The Dovecots and Pigeon Lofts of Wiltshire, John and Pamela McCann, Hobnob Press, 2011, ISBN 978 0 946418 84 8
- The Imperial Gazetteer of England and Wales embracing recent changes in counties dioceses parishes and boroughs general statistics postal arrangements railway systems &c. and forming a complete description of the country, John M. Wilson, 1870,
- Collectanea, Wiltshire Archaeological and Natural History Society, Volume XII; Williams, N J (editor), Records Branch, Devizes, 1956
- The Two of Us: My Life with John Thaw, Sheila Hancock, Bloomsbury Publishing, 2005, ISBN 9780747577096
- Just Me, Sheila Hancock, Bloomsbury Publishing Plc, 2009
- C: The Secret Life of Sir Stewart Menzies, Spymaster to Winston Churchill, Anthony Cave Brown, Macmillan, 1987
- The Unseen War in Europe: Espionage and Conspiracy in the Second World War, John H. Waller, I B Tauis & Co., London 1996
- Hitler's Spy Chief, Richard Bassett, Orion Publishing 2005
- Maud Coleno's Daughter: The life of Dorothy Hartman, 1898–1957, John Dann, Matador/Troubador Leics. 2017, ISBN 978 1785899 713
- The True Story of the Murder of Harry Neal, Bill Reed, Althelstan Museum, Malmesbury, 2018
