= Badminton railway line =

Railway line in Wiltshire and Gloucestershire, England

The Badminton railway line is a railway line opened in 1903 by the Great Western Railway between the Great Western Main Line at Wootton Bassett in Wiltshire and Patchway and Filton, north of Bristol, England. Forming the eastern section of the South Wales Main Line, it shortened the distance between South Wales and London for heavy mineral traffic and for express passenger trains; it relieved congestion on the line through Bath.

It was engineered to high standards with gentle gradients and large radius curves, and was correspondingly expensive to construct. It is about 30 miles in length.

The line is part of the principal route between South Wales and London, and today carries a heavy main line passenger service. All intermediate stations were closed in the 1960s, but Bristol Parkway station was opened in 1971 and remains the only passenger station on the line. Electrification of the line has been completed.

== Before the Badminton line ==
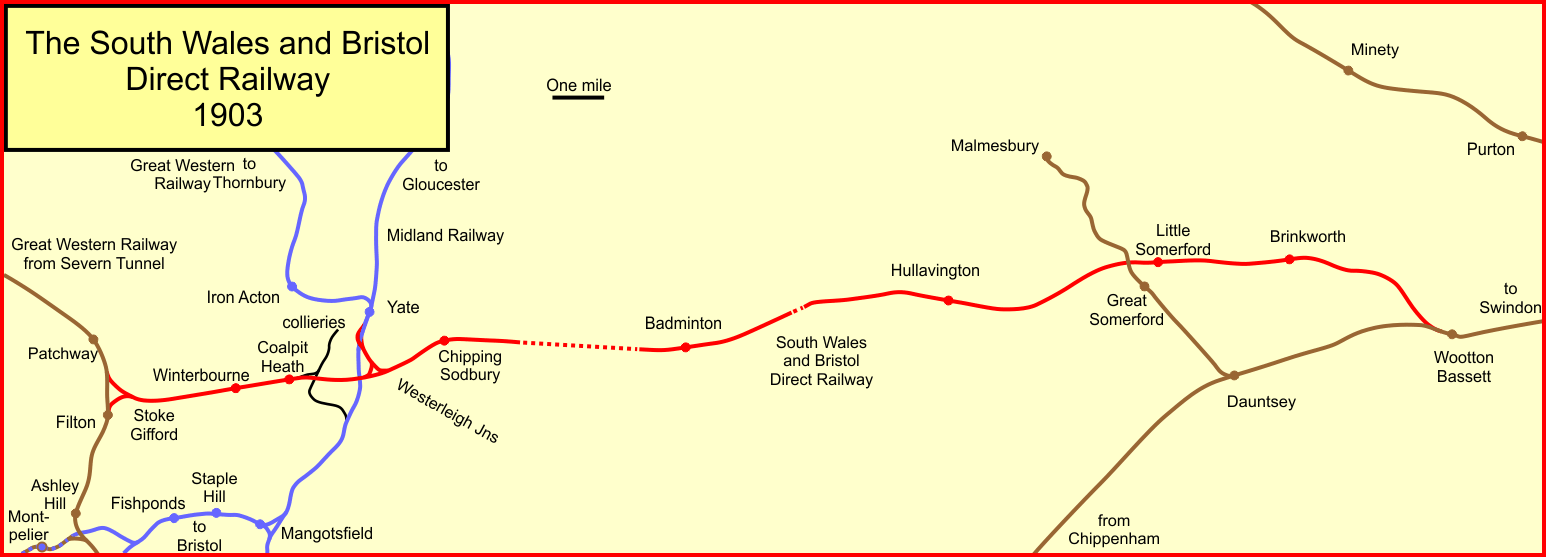
Map of the Badminton line

On 30 June 1841 the Great Western Railway company opened its first main line between London and Bristol. (Note: Robertson and Abbott give 31 May 1841 but this must be a mistake.) (Note: Christiansen consistently refers to the GWR main line as "the L&B line", for "London and Bristol".) By this means the capital and one of the most important seaports were connected by a trunk railway line. The line was well laid out, passing through Reading and Bath. Its engineer was Isambard Kingdom Brunel.

At the early date when the design of the line was being finalised, Brunel was not confident of the ability of the steam engines of the day to ascend significant gradients pulling a load, and the solution appeared to be to concentrate the stiffest climb in a limited distance, and to make the remainder of the route as near to constantly level as possible. The short, steep sections could, he believed, be worked with stationary steam engines hauling the trains up by rope. Accordingly, Brunel designed the main line with two such inclines, in Box Tunnel and at Wootton Bassett. (Note: Wootton Bassett was retitled Royal Wootton Bassett in 2009.) In fact by the time the railway was being built, the capacity and reliability of steam engines had advanced considerably, and the stationary steam engines were never installed, but the legacy of the two steep inclines remained.

Even as the Great Western Railway main line was being built, the momentum of building railway lines in connection with it was building up. The Cheltenham and Great Western Union Railway was promoted to build a line from Swindon to Gloucester and Cheltenham, and the South Wales Railway was formed to build on from near Gloucester to Milford Haven. This was with a view to capturing the transatlantic maritime trade as well as communication with Ireland.

The Cheltenham and Great Western Union Railway was absorbed by the Great Western Railway before the line was opened, and the South Wales Railway amalgamated with the GWR in 1863. The network was built on the broad gauge, and this led to difficulty in competing for coal traffic from South Wales to London and the South Coast of England, as most of the coal was extracted in the South Wales Valleys, which were generally connected by narrow (standard) gauge railways. (Note: The principal exception was the Vale of Neath Railway.) The physical transshipment of the mineral was laborious and expensive, and many producers preferred to use coastal shipping instead.

When the Taff Vale Extension line of the Newport, Abergavenny and Hereford Railway was fully operational, and then taken over by the GWR, coal could be transferred on narrow (standard) gauge track to London and Southampton via Hereford.

As the South Wales coal business increased exponentially, there was thus a residual hostility to the Great Western Railway, and this continued after conversion of the track gauge in 1873, when at last the GWR could freely convey coal on the most direct routes available.

== The Severn Tunnel ==
It was not until 1886 that the Severn Tunnel was operational, on 1 September 1886 for goods and on 1 December 1886 for passenger trains. (Note: An experimental mineral train had passed through the tunnel on 9 January 1886.) Before that date the shortest route for minerals and passengers from South Wales was via Gloucester and Swindon. Now that the Severn Tunnel was available, that traffic could run via Bristol (or the short avoiding line known as Dr Days Curve) and Bath. This was a considerable improvement, but the route through Bath became heavily congested, now carrying much of the South Wales traffic and all of the Bristol and West of England traffic.

== London and South Wales Railway ==
In South Wales, dissatisfaction with the Great Western Railway continued to be a factor. It was effectively a monopoly for the trunk haulage of coal to London and Southampton (as far as Salisbury; Southampton was an important bunkering port for the transatlantic shipping trade, and Portsmouth was a major home port for the Royal Navy.)

The Barry Railway Company had been exceptionally successful in South Wales in building ambitious and well-laid-out lines to its modern and well-equipped port. this emboldened those associated with it, and with coalowners who used it and were pleased with the alternatives it offered, to put together a scheme for a London and South Wales Railway. This was announced in November 1895. It was to build a new line from Cogan via Cardiff and skirting Newport on the north side, crossing the River Severn at Beachley by a new 3,300 yard bridge, then via Thornbury, Malmesbury and Lechlade, to make a junction with the Metropolitan Railway near Great Missenden. At 163 miles in length, the scheme was costed at £5,688,252. At the same time, the Vale of Glamorgan Railway promoted a Bill for a new line westward from Ewenny via Porthcawl and Port Talbot to join the Rhondda and Swansea Bay Railway at Aberavon.

For at least a decade, the Great Western Railway had indicated that it might build a cut-off line to shorten the route from the Severn Tunnel to London, but it had not done so. Barrie says, "Beyond all reasonable doubt, the real object of the London & South Wales promoters was to force the Great Western Railway to carry out its South Wales Direct Line, and to make certain concessions to the South Wales coal trade."

Now the GWR saw the real possibility of a competing line being built, and hastily put together a Parliamentary Bill for its own direct line. Both schemes were submitted for the 1886 Parliamentary session. The promoters of the London and South Wales Railway, no doubt seeing that their objective had been achieved, withdrew their Bill.

== The GWR bill ==
Accordingly, the Great Western Railway promoted a bill in the 1896 session for a line from Wootton Bassett to Patchway. At 30 miles in length the line would reduce the South Wales to London journey by ten miles. It would also by-pass the Box and Wootton Bassett inclines, and relieve the heavy congestion between Bathampton and Bristol. This last was so difficult that quadrupling the line had been considered, "an impossibly costly proceeding" according to MacDermot.

Great Western Railway (South Wales and Bristol Direct Railway) Act 1896
- Act of Parliament
- Parliament of the United Kingdom
- Long title: An Act to empower the Great Western Railway Company to make new Railways in the Counties of Wilts and Gloucester and for other purposes.
- Citation: 59 & 60 Vict. c. ccxviii

Dates
- Royal assent: 7 August 1896

Text of statute as originally enacted

The Great Western Railway (South Wales and Bristol Direct Railway) Act 1896 (59 & 60 Vict. c. ccxviii) was passed on 23 July 1896. (Note: Robertson and Abbott say 7 August 1896. MacDermot simply says 1896.)

== Construction ==
A contract for the main part of the construction was let to Pearson & Son Limited on 21 October 1897, in the amount of £986,000.

The major work was the Sodbury tunnel, which was constructed from seven vertical shafts as access to the sites of the ends of the tunnels had not been excavated at first. The contractor used a remarkable number of steam locomotives in the work: 50 were in use at one time or another (but not simultaneously), reflecting the volume of earth that was moved. Excavated material amounted to five million cubic yards.

== Opening ==
The first section of the line was opened to goods traffic on 1 January 1903, and from Badminton to Patchway and Filton, also for goods traffic, on 1 May 1903. On 26 June 1903 Colonel H. A. Yorke of the Board of Trade made an inspection of the line over two days; BoT approval was a requirement before the operation of passenger trains was permitted. Yorke approved the line but insisted on a general speed restriction of 35 mph (56 km/h) for three months. Use of the Westerleigh loops by passenger trains was refused for the time being as the junctions were not ready.

The entire route of 29 3/4 mi (47.9 km) was opened to passenger traffic on 1 July 1903. A large marshalling yard was built at Stoke Gifford, with ten sidings capable of holding 500 wagons. From Stoke Gifford a spur ran to Filton, towards Bristol. Intending that the line should be suitable for heavy mineral traffic from South Wales as well as express passenger trains, the steepest gradient was made at 1 in 300, and no curve of less radius than one mile; this was achieved by some heavy earthworks as well as four large viaducts, one near Somerford over the Avon and the Malmesbury Branch, and three near Winterbourne. The Chipping Sodbury Tunnel (4,444 yards, 4.064 km) was built under the ridge of the Cotswolds between Badminton and Chipping Sodbury, and the Alderton Tunnel (506 yards, 463 m) at Alderton east of Badminton. (Note: Cooke gives the length of Sodbury Tunnel as 4,433 yards, 4.054 km.) Stations were built at Brinkworth, Little Somerford, Hullavington, Badminton, Chipping Sodbury, Coalpit Heath, and Winterbourne, and water troughs laid near Chipping Sodbury. The stations at Little Somerford, Badminton, Chipping Sodbury and Coalpit Heath were constructed with four tracks, with platforms on the outer two, to enable through fast trains to overtake slower trains.

The new line shortened the distance between London and South Wales by ten miles and was considerably easier to work over, enabling an acceleration of the express trains by 25 minutes, and allowing much greater loads to be carried by the coal trains from Stoke Gifford. (The gradients in the Severn Tunnel remained the limiting factor there.)

The original Parliamentary Bill for the line proposed a branch to the Severn and Wye Joint Railway, which would have run more or less parallel with the Bristol and Gloucester line of the Midland Railway. The proposal was withdrawn by arrangement with the Midland Railway, and it was agreed that a short spur connection could be made at Yate and another south of Berkeley Road, to connect it with the joint railway, and exercise their old running powers from 1846 and 1848 over the intervening 11 miles (18 km) of the Midland line. The two spurs referred to opened for goods traffic on 9 March 1908.

On 1 July 1903, four South Wales expresses each way were altered to use the Badminton Line: the best of these reached Newport in 2 hours 33 minutes compared with 2 hours 57 minutes formerly. On 4 August 1903 a first part of the old Up Flying Dutchman from Bristol was altered to leave Temple Meads at noon and run over the Badminton line to arrive at Paddington at 2 o'clock, the speed for the 117 5/8 miles (189.3 km) being 58.8 miles per hour (94.6 km/h). This was the first regular two-hour train between London and Bristol.

== Mineral railways at Coalpit Heath ==
From 1832 a horse-operated tramway, part of the Bristol and Gloucestershire Railway, was constructed to connect coal pits in the vicinity of Coalpit Heath with the River Avon near Keynsham. By the time of the construction of the Badminton line the tramway had been converted to a standard gauge railway, and the Badminton line passed over it by a bridge. A siding connection was made to Coalpit Heath station.

== Locations ==
=== Westerleigh loops ===
The loops at Westerleigh, connecting the Badminton line with the Midland Railway at Yate, had been opened to goods trains concurrently with the Badminton main line itself. The GWR wished to use the loops to operate an independent service between Bristol and Gloucester, using running powers over the Midland Railway. However the Midland argued that the running powers, so far as the Westerleigh and Yate connections were concerned, only applied to traffic for the Severn and Wye line. They insisted that any Bristol to Gloucester through trains should use their Mangotsfield line from Bristol, incurring higher charges for use of the line. The issue went to arbitration and then to litigation, but the loop lines were out of use while the dispute continued. It was finally resolved in 1908 when they were reopened for goods trains, on 9 March. On 20 October they were inspected for passenger operation by Colonel Yorke and on 2 November 1908 the first use by a through passenger train took place.

During World War I the east loop was closed to save staff, from 18 December 1916 to 18 February 1919. Traffic on the east curve was never heavy, and it was closed from 10 July 1927. However, during World War II there were concerns that main routes might be blocked by enemy action, and the curve was reopened as an emergency alternative route. This included the provision of a new Westerleigh East Junction signal box; the curve was available from 16 August 1942 until final closure on 4 January 1950.

=== Badminton station ===
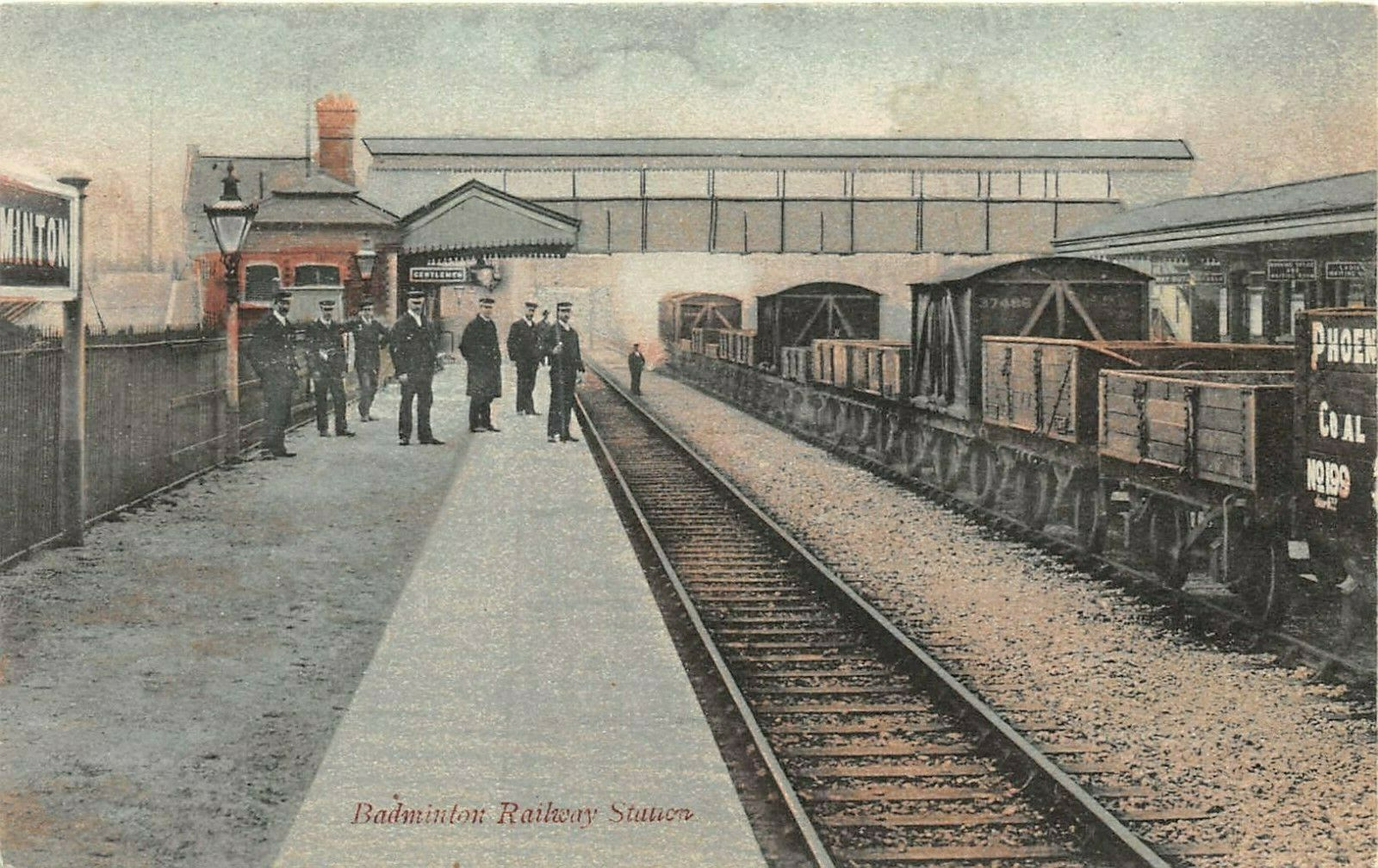
Badminton railway station, in around 1905

A covenant was signed between the Duke of Beaufort and the Great Western Railway undertaking that four passenger trains would make calls at Badminton station every day; in addition, any train must stop there if a first class passenger desired to alight.

=== Avonmouth ===
The Stoke Gifford direct line from Avonmouth was opened on 9 May 1910, running from Holesmouth Junction at Avonmouth to Stoke Gifford. This gave direct access for industrial mineral traffic to the West Midlands via Honeybourne.

=== Malmesbury branch ===
The Malmesbury branch had opened on 17 December 1877, running from Dauntsey station on the Great Western Railway main line. When the Badminton line was built, it crossed over the Malmesbury branch a short distance west of Little Somerford.

In 1932 the branch was altered to run into Little Somerford station instead of Dauntsey. The branch connection ran alongside the Badminton line for some distance to reach the station. The altered passenger service started on 17 July 1933. The original route to Dauntsey was closed, but part of it was retained as a stub for wagon storage for some years.

== Slip coaches ==
From May 1923, two down Fishguard trains slipped coaches for Temple Meads at Stoke Gifford. There was no passenger station there, and the slipped vehicles were taken on to Temple Meads by a train specially run to Stoke Gifford for the purpose. The trains concerned were the 8.45 am and the 8.0 pm from Paddington to Fishguard, and the slipped portions reached Temple Meads at 11.3 am and 10.20 pm respectively.

In Table 10, Fryer shows one slip at Stoke Gifford in 1932 for Bristol Temple Meads; and two in 1938, one of which continued to Taunton and the other to Weston-super-Mare.

== The Bristolian ==
To mark the centenary of the Great Western Railway, the company inaugurated an express train named The Bristolian in 1935. The westward route from London to Bristol was conventionally via Bath, but the return journey was over the Badminton line. The timing was 105 minutes each way non-stop.

== Station closures ==
The area served by the line was sparsely populated, and after World War II patronage of the intermediate stations fell away. On 3 April 1961 they were closed to passenger trains, with the exception of Badminton. Most of the intermediate goods services were withdrawn in the period from 1963 to 1965.

The closure of Badminton station was delayed by the undertaking given to the Duke of Beaufort when the line was authorised, that four trains would call daily, but closure finally took place on 3 June 1968.

Stoke Gifford yards were closed on 4 October 1971.

== Bristol to Gloucester route modified ==
By the 1960s the route for the majority of through passenger trains between Bristol and Gloucester was the former Midland Railway route through Fishponds. Very few through passenger trains used the former GWR alternative, through Filton and Westerleigh, except during busy periods at summer weekends. However it was decided to close the Fishponds line and divert all such traffic on to the Filton route, and this was done on 3 January 1970, from which date all such trains used the part of the Badminton line between Filton and Yate.

== Bristol Parkway station ==
All the South Wales to London trains and all the Bristol to Birmingham trains now passed through Stoke Gifford, and it was proposed to build a new station there. As an out-of-town location, it would be attractive to motorists in the Greater Bristol area, who might drive to the station and park, continuing by rail. Accordingly, the station was known as Bristol Parkway, opening on 1 May 1972. (Note: Robertson and Abbot give 1 July 1972; this may have been a formal or ceremonial opening.) Parking was free for some years.

== Line closure for upgrade ==
Due to a backlog of rectification work for deteriorating track formation, the line between Wootton Bassett Junction and Westerleigh Junction was closed from 5 May to 6 October 1975, to enable extensive upgrading of the infrastructure. London to South Wales ran via Bath.

In addition to the track formation work, crossovers for reversible operation were installed, and special arrangements were made for the permanent way staff's refuges in Alderton and Chipping Sodbury tunnels. This included handrails "to prevent [the track workers] being drawn out of the recess by the turbulence caused by a passing High Speed Train". The High Speed Trains were to be introduced on the line in the following October. (Note: Mitchell and Smith give dates in 1986 in the caption to image 32 (Swindon to Newport, Middleton Press, Midhurst, 2004, ISBN 1 904474 30 6); this is obviously a mistake; it happened in 1975 prior to the introduction of High Speed Trains.)

== Topography ==
=== Gradients ===
From Wootton Bassett Junction the line fell generally at 1 in 300 to Little Somerford, then climbing at the same gradient to Badminton. After that the line fell at 1 in 300 through Sodbury Tunnel and on to Stoke Gifford.

=== Station list ===
- Wootton Bassett Junction;
- Brinkworth; opened 1 July 1903; closed 3 April 1961;
- Little Somerford; four track station; opened 1 July 1903; closed 3 April 1961;
- Hullavington; opened 1 July 1903; closed 3 April 1961;
- Badminton; four track station; opened 1 July 1903; closed 3 June 1968;
- Chipping Sodbury; four track station; opened 1 July 1903; closed 3 April 1961;
- Coalpit Heath; four track station; opened 1 July 1903; closed 3 April 1961;
- Winterbourne; opened 1 July 1903; closed 3 April 1961;
- Bristol Parkway; opened 1 May 1972; still open;
- Stoke Gifford Junction;
- Patchway Junction.
