= Alderton =

Alderton may refer to:

== Places ==
=== England ===
- Alderton, Gloucestershire
- Alderton, Northamptonshire
- Alderton, Shropshire
- Alderton, Suffolk
- Alderton, Wiltshire
  - Alderton Tunnel, railway tunnel

=== United States ===
- Alderton, Washington

== People ==
- Alderton (surname)
