= Old Sodbury =

Village in Gloucestershire, England

Coordinates: 51.533601°N 2.356147°W

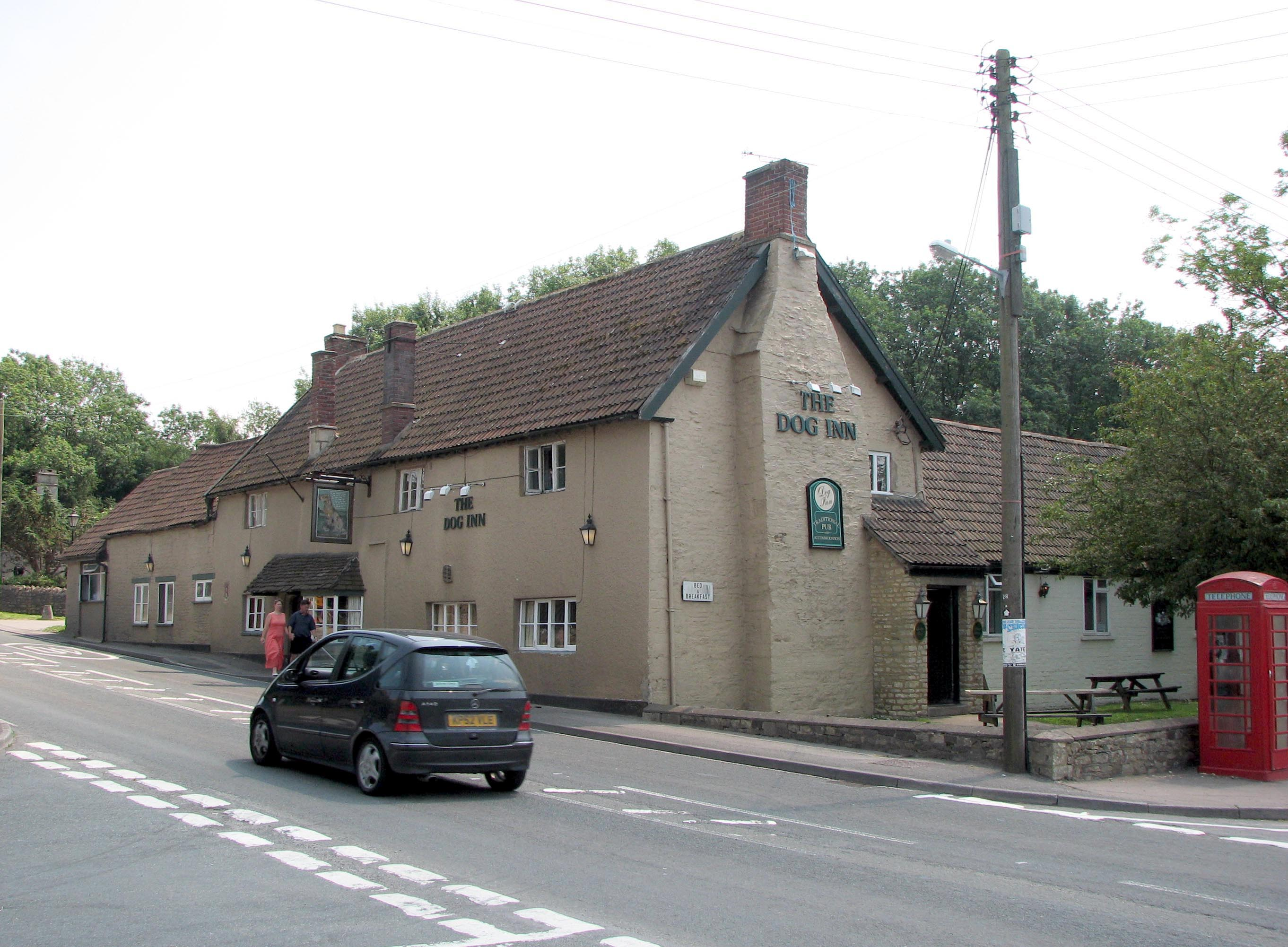
- The Dog Inn

- Location within Gloucestershire
- Area: 0.2890 km^{2} (0.1116 sq mi)
- Population: 700 (2021 Census)
  - Density: 2,422/km^{2} (6,270/sq mi)
- OS grid reference: ST726822
- Civil parish: Sodbury
- Unitary authority: South Gloucestershire
- Ceremonial county: Gloucestershire
- Region: South West
- Country: England
- Sovereign state: United Kingdom
- Post town: BRISTOL
- Postcode district: BS37
- Dialling code: 01454
- Police: Avon and Somerset
- Fire: Avon
- Ambulance: South Western
- UK Parliament: Thornbury and Yate

Old Sodbury is a village in the valley of the River Frome just below and to the west of the Cotswold escarpment and to the east of Chipping Sodbury and Yate, in the civil parish of Sodbury, in the South Gloucestershire district, in the ceremonial county of Gloucestershire, England. It is situated in the Hundred of Grumbald's Ash. The village extends from Chipping Sodbury in the West to the Cotswold Edge in the East and is on the Cotswold Way. The Badminton Road (A432) winds eastwards towards Badminton, Gloucestershire through the village, up to the Cross Hands junction with the A46, which runs along the top of the Cotswold escarpment from Bath to Stroud. In 2021 it had a population of 700. In 1931 the parish had a population of 837. On 1 April 1946 the parish was abolished to form Sodbury.

The village lies on an old coaching route, and is much more ancient than its westerly neighbour, Chipping Sodbury: hence the name 'Old' Sodbury.

== Name and fort ==
LIDAR image showing the layout of Old Sodbury Camp

The name of the village is recorded in Anglo-Saxon (in the dative case) as Soppanbyrig = "Soppa's fort", and in the Domesday Book of 1086 as Sopeberie. The name may refer to the Iron Age hillfort just to the north-east of the village. The fort, perched on the edge of the Cotswold escarpment, is enclosed on three sides by two parallel earthworks, and is open to the west, commanding an impressive view of the Frome Valley, Severn Vale and the Welsh mountains. The earth walls enclose an area of 11 acres (45,000 m^{2}), and are usually kept mown by the local farmer (the fort is in private hands, but accessible). The fort can be reached by footpath from the A46 road, and through the village from below via the Cotswold Way.

The Romans strengthened the fort for use as a stronghold to support their western frontier. In AD 577 the Saxon army is thought to have used the fort as a camp before the Battle of Deorham, a few miles to the south.

Bishop Milred (743–755) granted the land at Soppenbyrig to Eanbald, and he to Eastmund, on condition that there was a man in Holy Orders, and worthy of them, in their family, but if otherwise, the lands would pass back to the See of Worcester. In 888 the covenant failed; however, the land was granted to Eadnoth in perpetuity for the rent of 15 shillings, payable to the See of Worcester yearly at Tetbury.

In Edward the Confessor's reign, the manor formed part of the estate of Brictric, Earl of Gloucester.

King Edward IV camped here in 1471 before attacking the army of Margaret of Anjou at the Battle of Tewkesbury, which he won decisively.

== Church ==
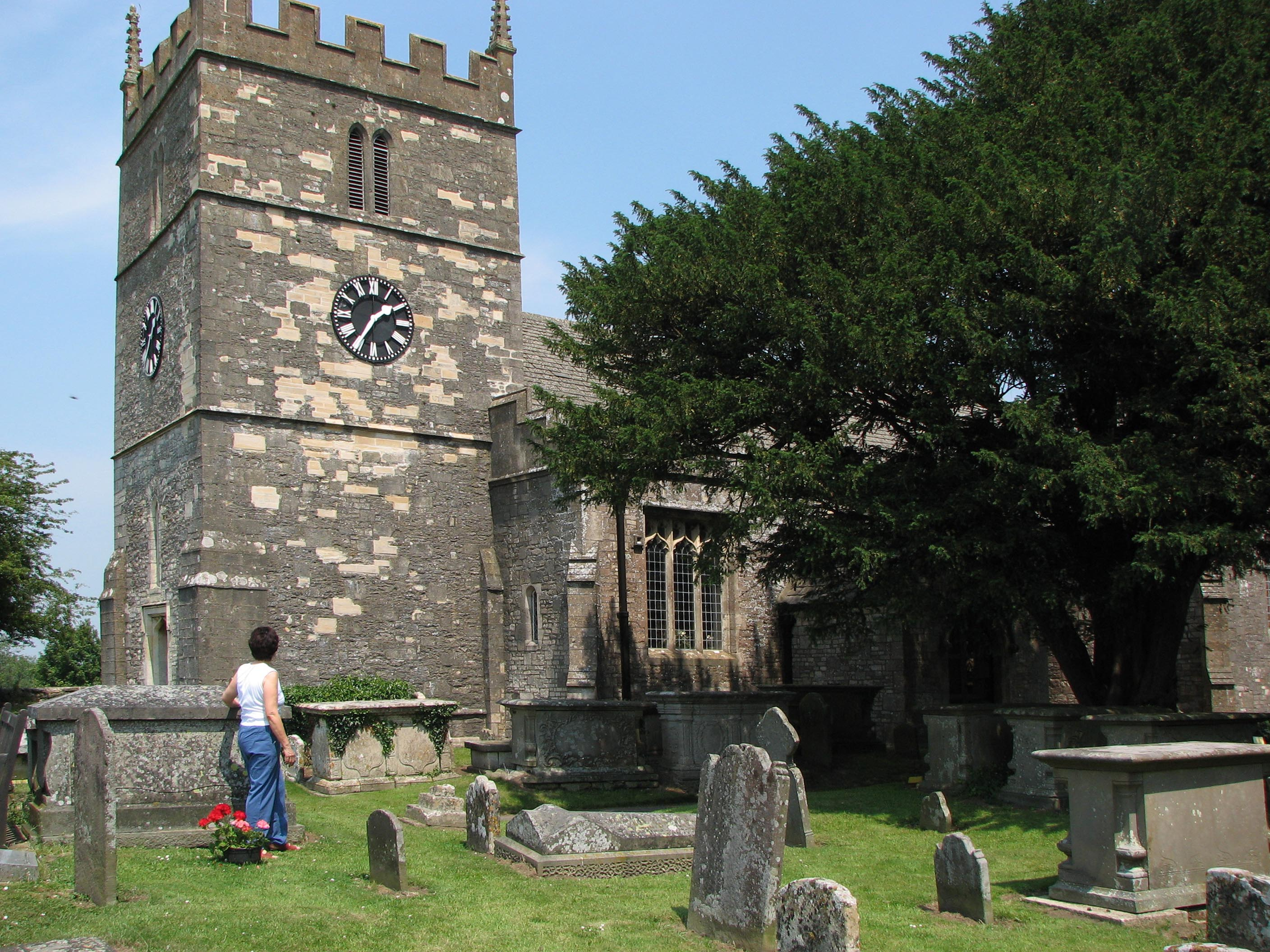
The church of St. John the Baptist

The Church of Saint John the Baptist is late Norman or Transitional, and is some 900 years old. It has two effigies of knights: one is late 14th century, carved in wood; and the other is dated to 1240, carved in stone, featuring a very large shield. These two are considered to have been lords of the local manor.

The church is of late Norman period, and although it has been much enlarged and altered, much of the original work remains. In the nave there is an arcade of Norman columns, there are two Norman windows and the tower is also Norman.

In the churchyard at Old Sodbury is a number of old bale-tombs; these were tombs for rich merchants. Some of the gravestones date back to the early 19th century. Just outside the churchyard on the hillside is a topograph (a large stone with an engraving), installed to commemorate the second millennium, that shows Old Sodbury in relation to its geographical surroundings.

== Other buildings ==
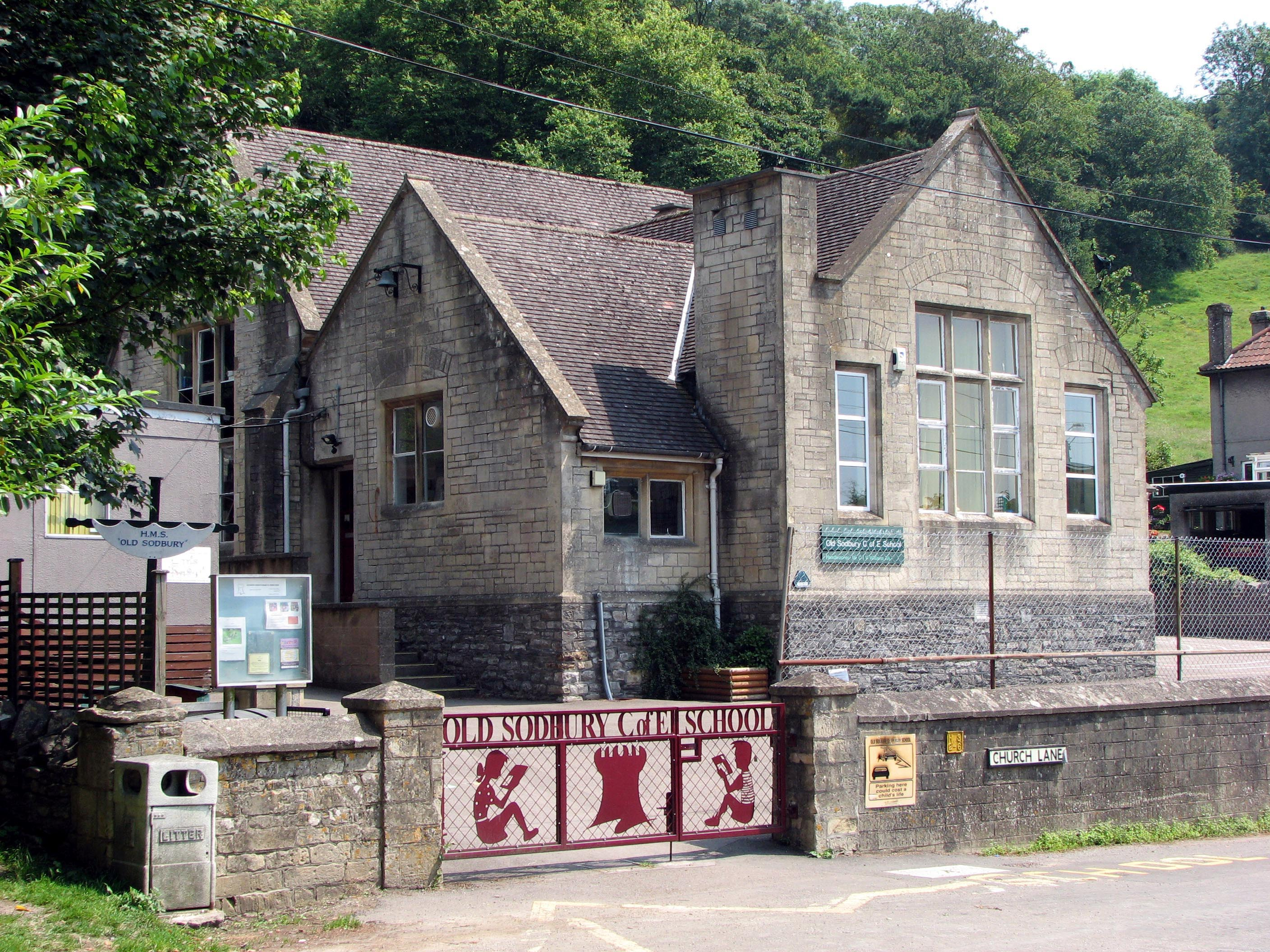
The Church of England School

There is a primary school (Old Sodbury CofE Primary School), a Nursery (Overndale House), two hotels and a Public House (The Dog Inn). The village has a petrol station, football pitch and a playground, but no longer a post office since the round of closures in 2008. The village shop soldiered on in the same premises on the Badminton Road for another three years, but finally closed in 2011.

The historic Cross Hands Hotel stands on the north-eastern corner of the A46 crossroads; heavy snow caused Queen Elizabeth II to take refuge in the Cross Hands in 1981, when she was being driven back to London and the roads were impassable. There is a farm shop (Cotswold Edge) opposite the hotel.

There is a crenellated tower resembling a rook chess piece on the escarpment immediately above and to the east of the village, visible from the main road. It performs the function of a ventilation shaft (the first of six) for the Chipping Sodbury Tunnel on the main railway line from South Wales, via Bristol Parkway to London Paddington. This line was opened in 1903 as part of the Great Western Railway, which runs through the village and under the hill above it. Trains used to stop at Chipping Sodbury and Badminton stations, which were closed following the Beeching cuts. The nearest station is now Yate on the main line from Bristol Temple Meads to Birmingham, which separates from the former Great Western Railway at Westerleigh, to the South of Yate.

Lyegrove House, one mile east of the village just off the B4040 road to Badminton, is 17th century in origin, altered in the 19th and 20th centuries. The Gothic-style Lodge was built in 1835 and designed by Charles Dyer of Bristol. In 1927, Diana, Countess of Westmorland contracted George Herbert Kitchin (1870–1951) to restore the house and lay out the formal gardens. Other examples of Kitchin's designs are Compton End, Winchester, and Horsley Hall, Gresford.
