= Alderton (surname) =

Origin
- Region of origin: England

Other names
- Variant form: numerous

Alderton is an English locational name from any of the various places so called, although they do not share the same derivations.

Notable people with the surname include:

- Charles Alderton, the creator of Dr Pepper soft drink
- David Alderton (born 1956), English writer
- Dolly Alderton, British writer
- Gene Alderton (1934–1992), American football player
- Jimmy Alderton (1924–1998), English footballer
- John Alderton (born 1940), English actor
- John Alderton (American football) (1931–2013), American football player
- Lisle Alderton (1888–1969), New Zealand naval officer
- Terry Alderton (born 1970), English comedian
