= Good Times Live =

Music festival

- Genre: Rock, pop, R&B, comedy
- Dates: Late May (bank holiday period)
- Locations: Chipping Sodbury, South Gloucestershire, England
- Years active: 2023–present
- Founders: James Murden, Tom Campbell
- Website: https://goodtimeslive.co.uk

Good Times Live is an annual music and entertainment festival held in Chipping Sodbury, near Bristol, England. The festival originated in Yate as a community event focused on cover and tribute bands before expanding to feature internationally recognised artists and comedians. The event typically takes place over several days around the late May bank holiday weekend and operates as a series of individually ticketed performances rather than a single continuous camping festival.

== History ==
Good Times Live began at Yate Town Football Club in South Gloucestershire as a small-scale festival featuring cover and tribute acts. According to festival organisers, tribute performances were initially booked due to limited resources and uncertainty around demand for original artists.

The festival gained wider attention in 2024 after booking the British pop group McFly as a headline act, signalling a shift toward original artists and higher-profile bookings.

In 2025, the festival relocated to The Ridings in Chipping Sodbury to accommodate increased attendance and a larger production footprint. The move marked a significant expansion of the event, with multiple headline performances across several days.

== Format and organisation ==
Good Times Live differs from traditional multi-day camping festivals by operating as a series of separately ticketed concerts and comedy events. Organisers have described the format as a way to maintain accessibility for local audiences while offering a broad range of entertainment across different genres.

== Lineups ==
=== 2024 ===
- McFly
- Sophie Ellis-Bextor

=== 2025 ===
The first year at The Ridings featured several high-profile performers:

- Billy Ocean
- Craig David
- Jools Holland
- Skunk Anansie
- Will Young
- Natalie Imbruglia

=== 2026 ===
Acts announced for the 2026 edition include:

- The Human League (with special guest Marc Almond)
- Jessie J
- Madness (band)
- Emeli Sandé
- Russell Howard

== Founders ==
Good Times Live was founded by James Murden and Tom Campbell. Murden serves as festival director, while Campbell manages production and technical staging. The pair have stated that the festival was conceived to bring a large-scale live music event to South Gloucestershire, an area they felt was underserved by major touring acts.

== Venue ==
The festival was originally held at Yate Town Football Club before relocating to The Ridings in Chipping Sodbury in 2025. The Ridings provides increased capacity and infrastructure suitable for larger audiences and headline performances.
