= Chipping Sodbury Town Hall =

Municipal building in Gloucestershire, England

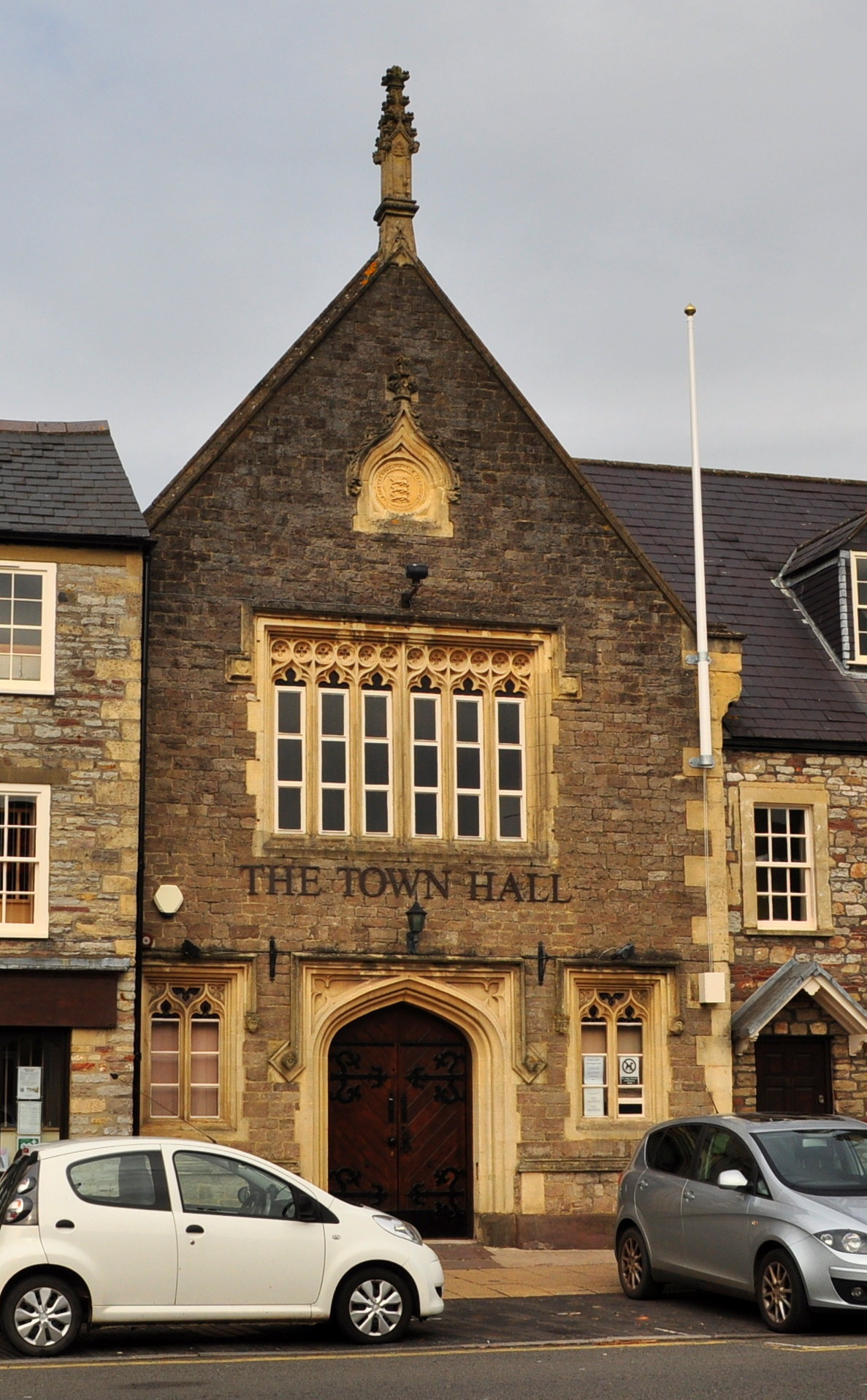
- Chipping Sodbury Town Hall

- Shown in Gloucestershire
- 51.5385°N 2.3932°W
- Location: Broad Street, Chipping Sodbury

History
- Built: 1858

Site notes
- Architectural style: Perpendicular Gothic style

Listed Building – Grade II
- Official name: Town Hall
- Designated: 29 July 1983
- Reference no.: 1129244

Chipping Sodbury Town Hall is a municipal building in Broad Street, Chipping Sodbury, Gloucestershire, England. The building, which is used as an events venue and also as the meeting place of Chipping Sodbury Town Council, is a Grade II listed building.

== History ==
The original building on the site was a guildhall which dated back to the 15th century. Following the dissolution of the chantries in 1547 and a brief subsequent period of private ownership, the site was acquired by the town and restored. It was then re-fronted in 1738 and re-modelled with a new façade, designed in the Perpendicular Gothic style and built in rubble masonry with ashlar stone dressings, in 1858.

The design of the new façade involved a symmetrical main frontage with three bays facing onto Broad Street; it featured an arched doorway with a hood mould flanked by two-light mullioned windows on the ground floor, a six-light mullioned window on the first floor and a gable above. The gable contained an ogee-shaped panel with a crest and was surmounted by a pinnacle. Internally, the principal room was the main hall which was the meeting place of the bailiff and the burgesses. The building contained a large chest, made of oak with iron straps, which was known as the parish coffer and was used for storage of valuable documents: it also dated back to the 15th century.

The borough council, which had not met for many years, was formally abolished under the Municipal Corporations Act 1883. In 1894, on the formation of Chipping Sodbury Rural District Council, the bailiff and burgesses resisted transfer of the town hall to the new council and it passed instead, on the instructions of the Charity Commissioners, to the Town Lands Charity. Following local government re-organisation in 1974, the building became the meeting place of the newly formed Sodbury Town Council. After an extensive programme of refurbishment works, which included a new stage in the main hall and new catering facilities, the building re-opened in 1981.

The building continued to be used as an events venue and performers in the 21st century included the singer, Jacqui Dankworth, who gave a concert in the town hall in October 2016, the Chipping Sodbury Music Society who performed a 70th anniversary concert in December 2017 and the boxer, Frank Bruno, who gave a talk there in January 2018.
