= Ventilation shaft =

Vertical passages used to move air underground

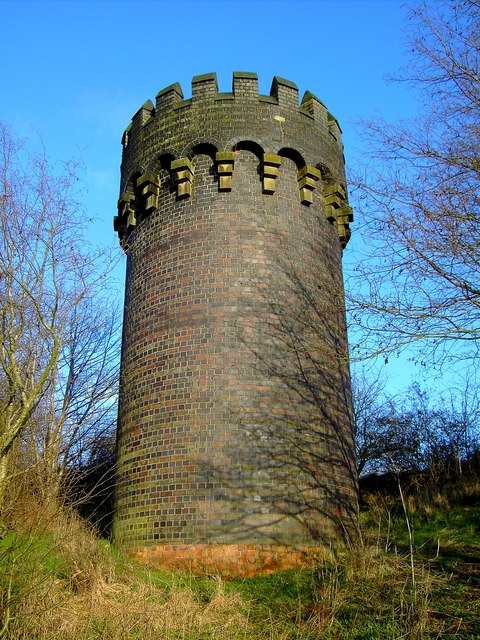
Chipping Sodbury Tunnel ventilation shaft

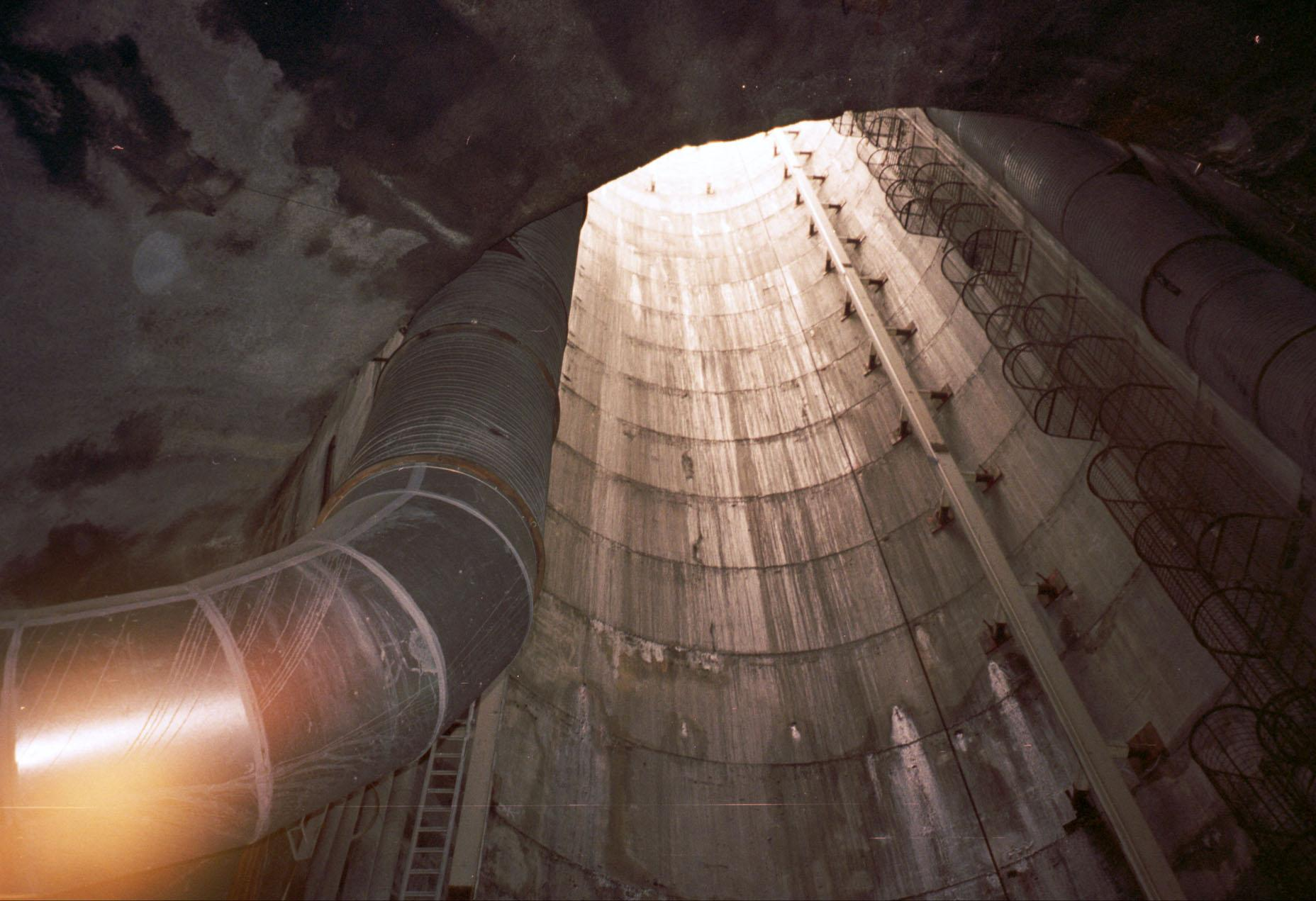
Swan St. ventilation shaft on the Burnley Tunnel

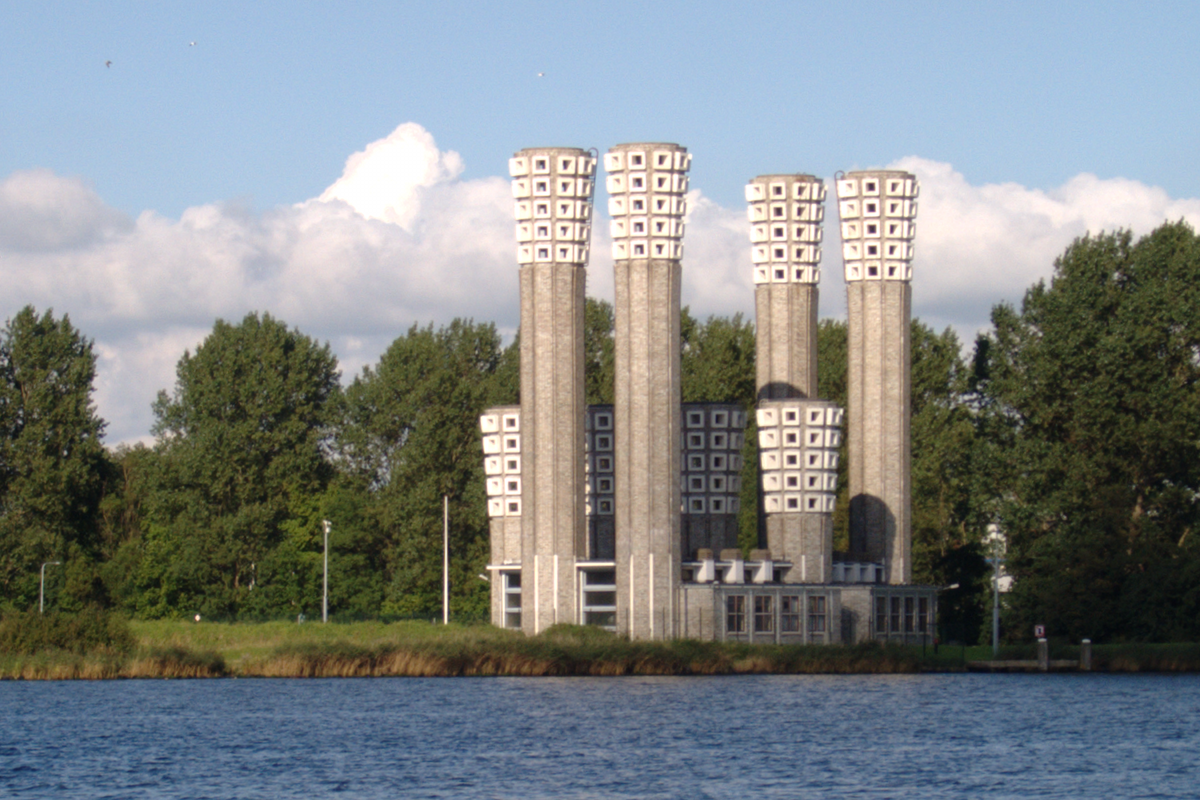
Ventilation shafts of the Velser tunnel, the Netherlands

In subterranean civil engineering, ventilation shafts, also known as airshafts or vent shafts, are vertical passages used in mines and tunnels to move fresh air underground, and to remove stale air.

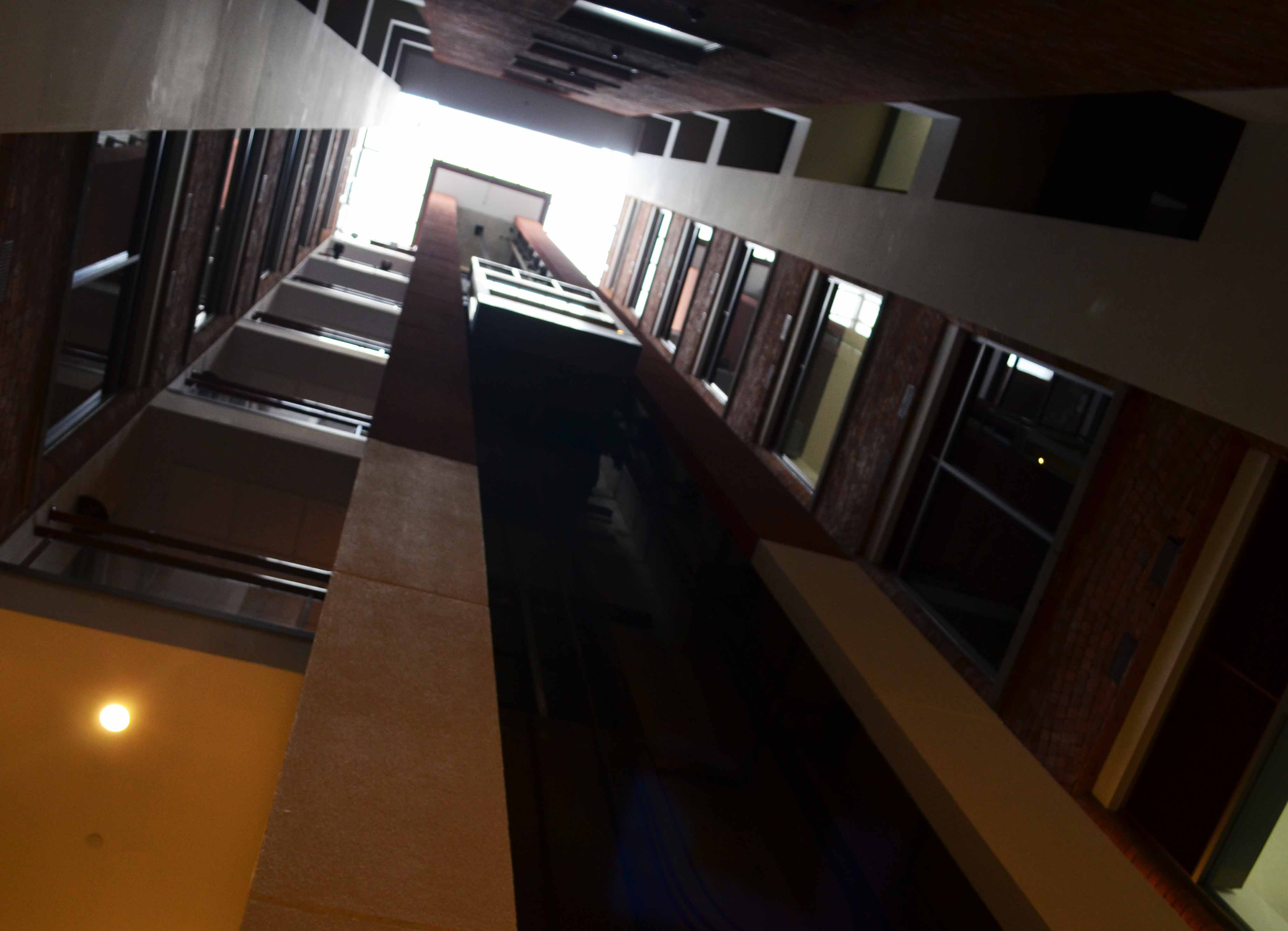
Airshaft/lightwell in a building in Lombardy, Italy

In architecture, an airshaft, also known as a lightwell, is typically a small, vertical space within a tall building which permits ventilation of the building's interior spaces to the outside. The floor plan of a building with an airshaft is often described as a "square donut" shape. Alternatively, an airshaft may be formed between two adjacent buildings. Windows on the interior side of the donut allow air from the building to be exhausted into the shaft, and, depending on the height and width of the shaft, may also allow extra sunlight inside.

== See also ==
- Ventilation (architecture)
- Stack effect
- Underground mine ventilation
- Courtyard
- Lightwell
- Skylight
- Atrium (architecture)
