= Chipping Sodbury Tunnel =

Railway tunnel in Gloucestershire, England

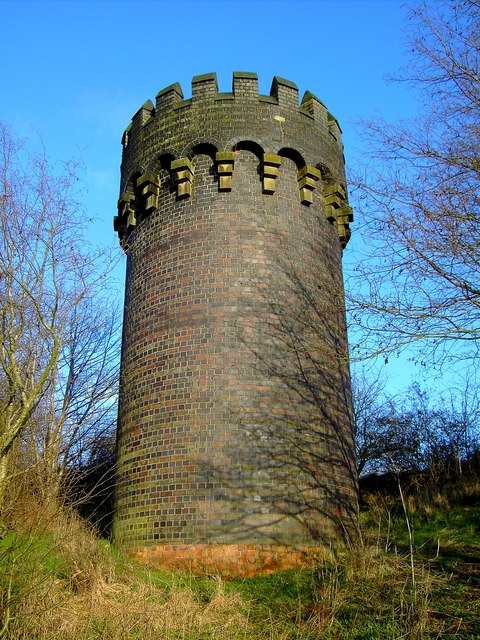
- A crenellated ventilation shaft of the tunnel
- Interactive map of Chipping Sodbury Tunnel

Overview
- Line: South Wales Main Line
- Location: Cotswold Hills, outside Badminton, Gloucestershire
- OS grid reference: TQ 30404 84602
- Status: operational
- System: National Rail
- Start: 1902
- No. of stations: None

Operation
- Owner: Network Rail
- Operator: Great Western Railway; Transport for Wales Rail
- Traffic: Mixed

Technical
- Length: 2.5 miles (4.0 km)
- No. of tracks: 2
- Track gauge: 1,435 mm (4 ft 8 1/2 in)
- Electrified: 25 kV 50 Hz AC

Chipping Sodbury Tunnel is a railway tunnel that is situated on the South Wales Main Line in England. It runs under the Cotswold Hills for 4444 yards, approximately 2 1/2 miles (4.0 km) west of Badminton railway station and Chipping Sodbury Yard.

The tunnel was built between 1897 and 1902; it was amongst the last of the major railway tunnels to be constructed in Britain. Built to hide the line from the nearby Badminton House, a total of six crenellated ventilation shafts are present. The tunnel was built with a mess room at the midpoint so that maintenance crews could remain in the tunnel for the whole working day/ night. Due the tunnel passing through an underground aquifer, it has been particularly prone to flooding and associated closures. It was also a secondary target for Luftwaffe bombing during the Second World War.

Numerous remedial works and improvements have been made to the tunnel throughout its service life. Such works have largely been centred around improving its drainage and other measures to reduce the occurrence of flood-related closures. A new high-capacity drainage system was installed during the 2010s. In the same decade, the tunnel was temporarily closed as part of the modernisation of the Great Western main line, for which overhead electrification equipment was installed throughout its length, enabling electric traction to traverse the tunnel.

== History ==
The construction of Chipping Sodbury Tunnel commenced during 1897 for the South Wales and Bristol Direct Railway. It was one of the major civil engineering features of a direct 30 mile link between Wootton Bassett and Patchway, which reduced distance between London and Wales by ten miles over the previous route, as well as speeding up rail traffic by enabling trains to avoid congestion around Bristol. The tunnel enabled the line to pass through the Cotswold Edge escarpment, which was perhaps the most challenging topological features along the new line's route. A further major factor in the tunnel's design was the nearby Badminton House country house, from which it was considered important for the new railway to minimise its visual impact on its estate.

According to the railway industry periodical Rail Engineer, it was one of the last major railway tunnels to be constructed in Britain. The tunnel is constructed with an arch brick lining and measures some 27'6" across and 20'9" high. The clay bricks used in the tunnel were fired at a nearby brickworks; this works used material which had been excavated as spoil from the boring process. Around 150 navvies and almost 100 railway personnel lived in the village of Sodbury during the construction effort. During 1902, the completed tunnel was opened to traffic for the first time, although the full line would not be opened in full until the following year.

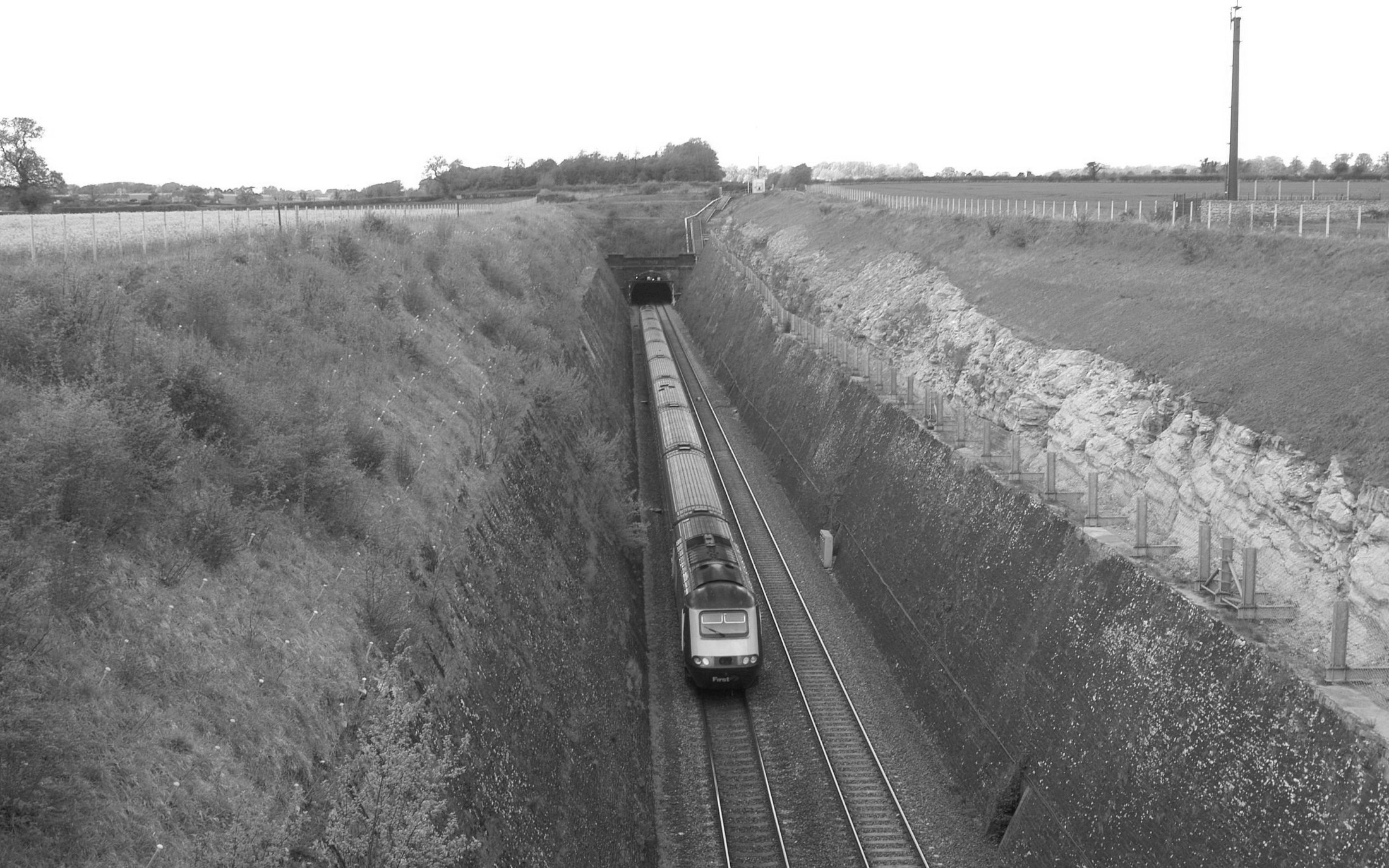
An Intercity 125 express train entering Chipping Sodbury Tunnel, 2012

It slopes at a 1:300 gradient from Badminton falling in a westerly direction towards Chipping Sodbury. The western portal lies in the village of Old Sodbury. Above the tunnel are a series of six ventilation shafts, which were used during construction to remove soil. The places where they reach the surface are circular brick vents between 4 metres (13 ft) and 8 metres (26 ft) high with crenellations around the top. All six are protected structures, having received Grade II listed status during the late 20th century. The brick-built east and west portals of the tunnel are similarly listed.

During the Second World War, the tunnel was a secondary target for the Luftwaffe bombers that regularly conducted bombing raids against Filton Aerodrome at neighbouring Bristol.

Up to the 1970s, as an additional safety measure to supplement the track circuits a single wire ran through the tunnel fixed at head height, the purpose being that if a train broke down in the tunnel the driver or guard would cut the wire and so put the signals to red behind the stricken train.

The tunnel passes through multiple underground water conduits and springs, which has been attributed for the tunnel's tendency towards frequent flooding. Water has been measured entering the tunnel at rates of up to 2.5 cubic metres per second. These floods have been a common cause of closures of the tunnel, which has resulted in frequent cancellations and the diversion of passenger and freight services. Accordingly, the tunnel has been a long-standing high-priority asset for attention amongst railway maintenance staff, despite the installation of pumps and other measures to remove the water.

During the 2010s, various plans were produced to improve the flooding situation, including the installation of 6.5 kilometres (4.0 mi) of pipes for a new gravity drainage system. This pipe, which has an external diameter of 1.2 metres and a length of 22 meters, has a capacity of 866 litres per second, and discharges into a newly enlarged lagoon, which can to hold up to 11,000,000 litres (2,400,000 imp gal; 2,900,000 US gal). Its installation necessitated the partial removal of an older brick culvert which carries water from the tunnel to the nearby Kingrove river.

As part of the modernisation of the Great Western main line, the route through the tunnel was temporarily closed to traffic between 8 May 2017 and 19 July 2017, and again between 19 August and 15 September 2017. During these closures, the tunnel was retrofitted to fit overhead electrification equipment, which was installed along its roof via nearly 7,000 holes driven into the ceiling. This package of works also involved measures to reduce the occurrence of flooding.

== Coordinates ==
- Western end - 51°31′54″N 2°21′30″W
- Eastern end - 51°31′47″N 2°18′00″W
