= David Alderton =

British essayist (1956-)

- Born: 1956 (age 69–70); England
- Occupation: Author
- Children: 3
- Writing career
- Genre: Non-fiction
- Subjects: Pets and natural history
- Website: petinfoclub.co

David Alderton is an English writer specialising in pets and natural history topics. Growing up in a home surrounded by pets, he originally trained to become a veterinary surgeon. An allergic dermatitis acquired in his final year of study forced a change of career however, and so led him into the field of writing about pets and their care. He has since become a regular contributor of articles on this subject to a wide range of newspapers and magazines in the UK and abroad, and also participates frequently in radio and television programmes. As of 2010 his books have sold over five million copies, and have been translated into 30 different languages. Alderton's titles have won awards in the US from the Cat Writers' Association of America and the Maxwell Medallion from the Dog Writers' Association of America, as well as being nominated for the Sir Peter Kent Conservation Book Prize. He has also chaired the National Council for Aviculture, the umbrella organisation for bird-keeping clubs and associations in the UK.

== Selected bibliography ==
- Animals, published by Amber Books LTD, 2009
- Encyclopedia of Aquarium and Pond Fish, published by Dorling Kindersley, 2008
- Your Dog Interpreter, published by Reader's Digest, 2007
- Firefly Encyclopedia of the Vivarium, published by Firefly Books, 2007
- Chinchillas (Animal Planet Pet Care Library), published by TFH Publications, 2007
- Young at Heart (Caring for the Older Dog), published by Reader's Digest, 2007
- Your Cat Interpreter, published by Reader's Digest, 2006
- The Illustrated Encyclopedia of Birds of the World (with illustrator Peter Barrett), published by Southwater, 2004
- Horses (DK Pockets), published by Dorling Kindersley, 2003
- Smithsonian Handbook : Dogs, published by Dorling Kindersley, 2002
- Smithsonian Handbook : Cats, published by Dorling Kindersley, 2002
- Hamster (Collins Family Pet Guides), published by Collins, 2002
- Budgerigar (Collins Family Pet Guides), published by Collins, 2002
- The Small Animals Question and Answer Manual, published by Barron's Educational, 2001
- Hounds of the World (with photographer Bruce Tanner), published by Swan Hill Press, 2000
- Rodents of the World (with photographer Bruce Tanner), published by Cassell, 1999
- Foxes, Wolves & Wild Dogs of the World (with photographer Bruce Tanner), published by Cassell, 1998
- Wild Cats of the World (with photographer Bruce Tanner), published by Cassell, 1993
- Eyewitness Handbook of Cats, published by Dorling Kindersley, 1992
