= Winterbourne railway station =

Former railway station in Winterbourne, South Gloucestershire, England

Winterbourne
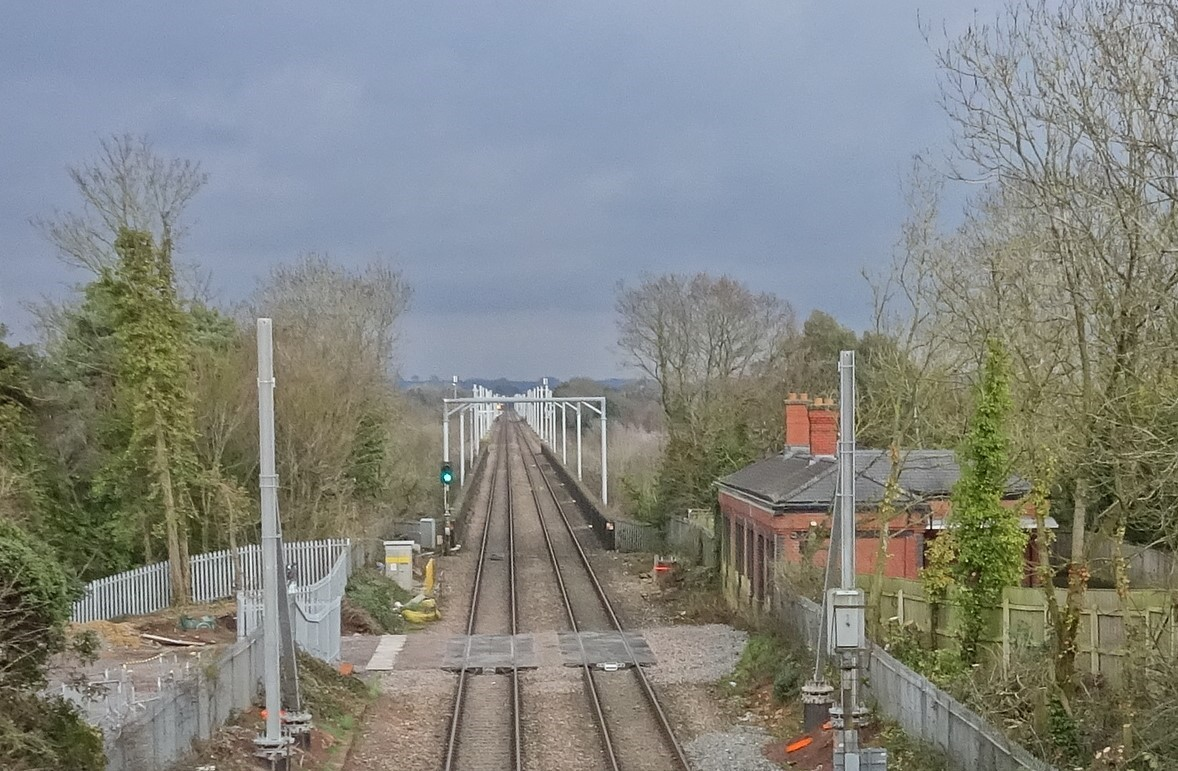
- The site of the station in 2018

General information
- Location: Winterbourne, South Gloucestershire; England
- Coordinates: 51.5174°N 2.4979°W
- Grid reference: ST655799
- Platforms: 2

Other information
- Status: Disused

History
- Original company: Great Western Railway
- Post-grouping: Great Western Railway

Key dates
- 1 July 1903: Opened
- 3 April 1961: Closed to passengers
- 7 October 1963: Closed to goods
Location

Winterbourne railway station served the South Gloucestershire village of Winterbourne, England, from 1903 to 1963.

Preceding station	Historical railways	Following station
Coalpit Heath; Line open, station closed	Great Western Railway; South Wales Main Line	Patchway

== See also ==
- Rail services in the West of England
