= Alderton, Wiltshire =

Coordinates: 51.545°N 2.232°W

Alderton
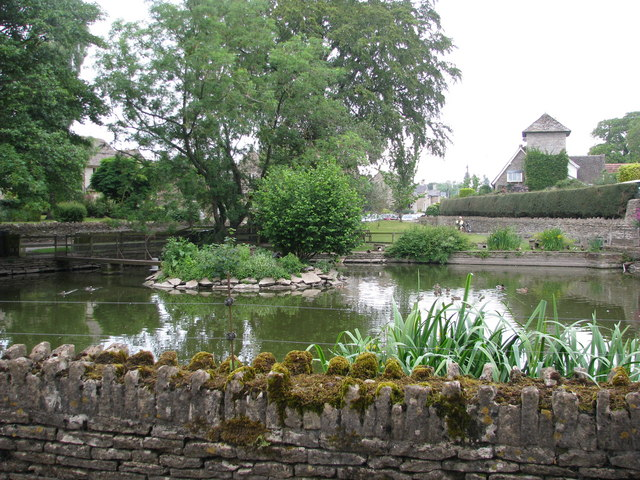
- Alderton duck pond

- Location within Wiltshire
- OS grid reference: ST840829
- Civil parish: Luckington
- Unitary authority: Wiltshire
- Ceremonial county: Wiltshire
- Region: South West
- Country: England
- Sovereign state: United Kingdom
- Police: Wiltshire
- Fire: Dorset and Wiltshire
- Ambulance: South Western
- UK Parliament: South Cotswolds
- Website: Parish Council

Alderton is a village and former civil parish, now in the parish of Luckington, in Wiltshire, England, 6 miles (9.7 km) southwest of Malmesbury. In 1931 the parish had a population of 107. On 1 April 1934 the parish was abolished and merged with Luckington.

The South Wales Main Line, the main railway from Swindon to Bristol and South Wales, runs close to the south of the village where it passes through the Alderton Tunnel.

The name Alderton derives from the Old English Ealdhereingtūn meaning 'settlement connected with Ealdhere'.

== Parish church ==
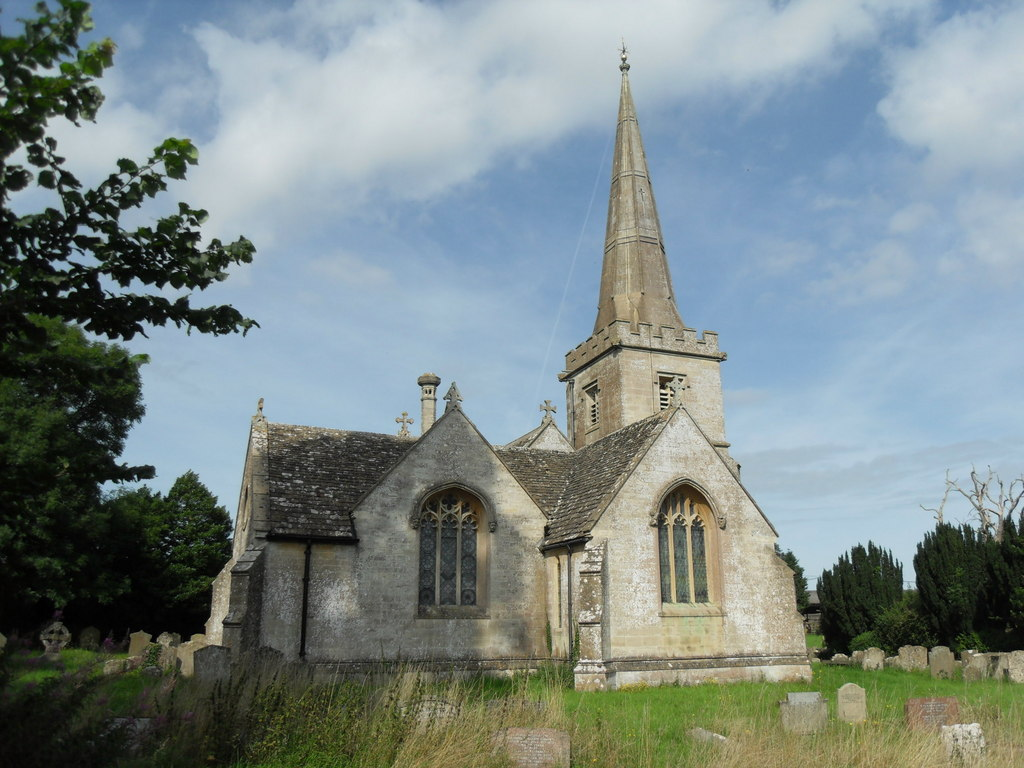
Church of St Giles

There was a church at Alderton in the 12th century, later dedicated to St Giles. In 1844–5 it was rebuilt by James Thomson at the expense of Joseph Neeld, who bought Alderton manor in 1927. Re-used elements from the earlier building include the north doorway and the three-bay arcade, both of c. 1200; and from the 15th century, the nave roof and the rood screen.

Some masonry from the old church was re-used in the building of the nearby school, also at Neeld's expense. Thomson worked on other churches in the area, including St Margaret's, Leigh Delamere.

There are monuments to the Gore family, including Thomas Gore (1632–1684), a High Sheriff of Wiltshire and writer on heraldry. The tower has six bells, of which five were cast by Mears for the 1844 restoration.

The building was designated as Grade II* listed in 1959. Alderton parish is now one of eight served by the Gauzebrook group ministry.
