= Jim Alderton =

English footballer

Personal information
- Full name: James Harris Alderton
- Date of birth: 6 December 1924
- Place of birth: Wingate, County Durham, England
- Date of death: 1998 (aged 73–74)
- Place of death: Kidderminster, Worcestershire, England
- Position: Wing-half

Senior career*
Years	Team	Apps	(Gls)
1941–1947	Wolverhampton Wanderers	11	(0)
1947–1952	Coventry City	62	(0)
- * Club domestic league appearances and goals

James Harris Alderton (6 December 1924 – 1998) was an English professional footballer who played in the Football League for Wolverhampton Wanderers and Coventry City.

== Career ==
Alderton joined Wolverhampton Wanderers' youth ranks from school in December 1941. He turned out for the club 111 times during wartime, as well as guesting for Chester City.

After the Football League was resumed following the end of World War II, he made his official league debut on 16 September 1946 in a 0–3 defeat at Aston Villa. He made all his Wolves appearances during the 1946−47 season that saw the club miss out on the league title after losing on the final day.

Unable to hold down a regular place, he moved to Coventry City in 1947 where he played for five seasons until injury struck. He dropped into the non-league with Darlaston before later retiring from the game.
