= Coalpit Heath railway station =

Disused railway station in Coalpit Heath, South Gloucestershire

Coalpit Heath
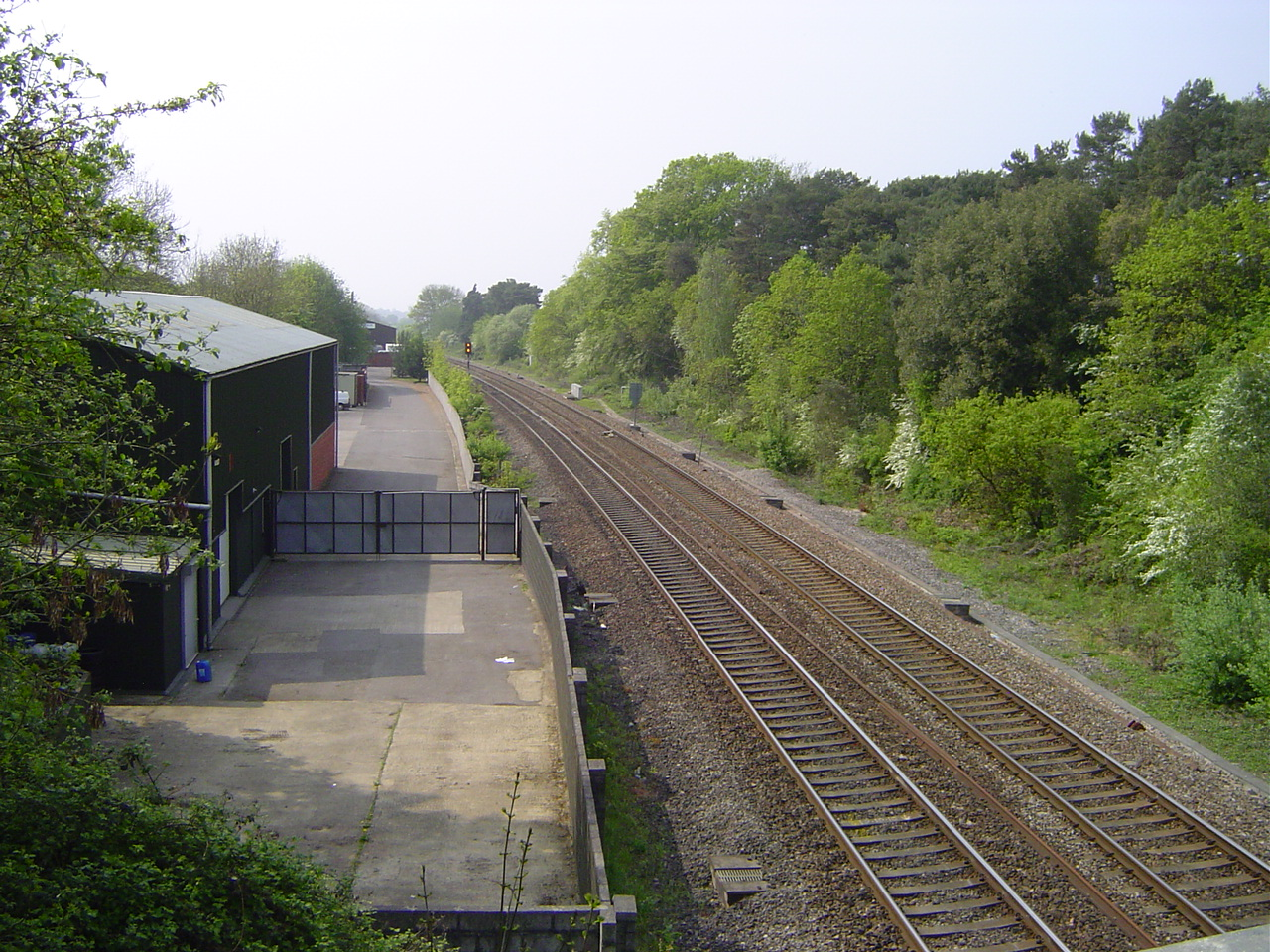
- Site in 2011, part of Ram Hill Business Park

General information
- Location: Coalpit Heath, South Gloucestershire; England
- Coordinates: 51.5207°N 2.4669°W
- Grid reference: ST677803
- Platforms: 2

Other information
- Status: Disused

History
- Original company: Great Western Railway
- Pre-grouping: Great Western Railway
- Post-grouping: Great Western Railway

Key dates
- 1 July 1903: Opened
- 3 April 1961: Closed
Location

Coalpit Heath railway station served the village of Coalpit Heath, South Gloucestershire, England from 1903 to 1961 on the South Wales Main Line.

== History ==
The station opened on 1 July 1903 by the Great Western Railway. The station was closed to both passengers and goods traffic on 3 April 1961.

Preceding station	Historical railways	Following station
Chipping Sodbury; Line open, station closed	Great Western Railway; South Wales Main Line	Winterbourne; Line open, station closed
