= Chipping Sodbury railway station =

Railway station in Gloucestershire, England

Chipping Sodbury
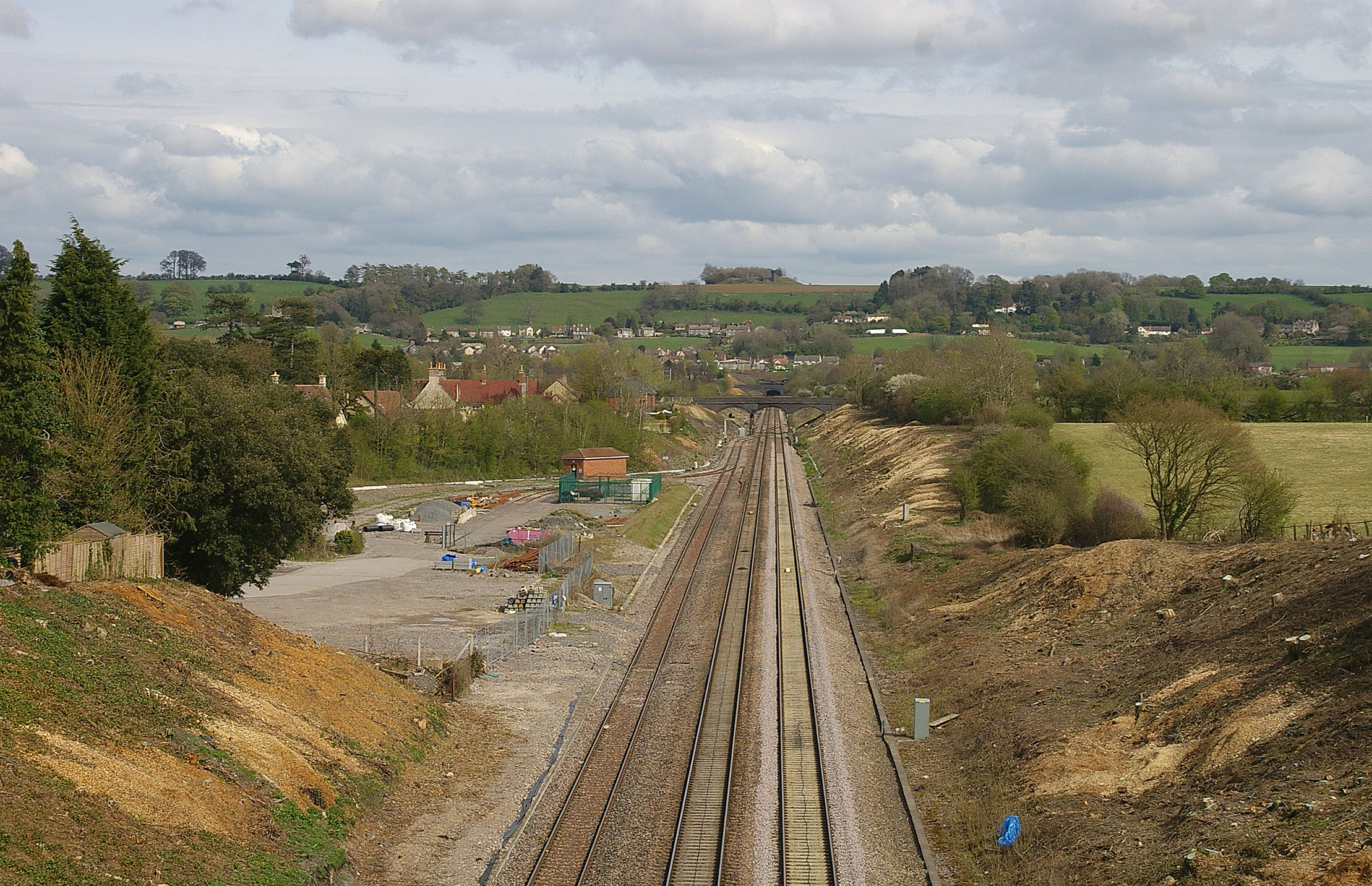
- The remains of the station viewed from the west.

General information
- Location: Chipping Sodbury, South Gloucestershire; England
- Coordinates: 51.5323°N 2.379°W
- Grid reference: ST736815
- Platforms: 2

Other information
- Status: Disused

History
- Original company: Great Western Railway
- Pre-grouping: GWR
- Post-grouping: GWR

Key dates
- 1 July 1903: Station opened
- 3 April 1961: Station closed to passengers
- 20 June 1966: Station closed to goods
Location

Chipping Sodbury railway station was a railway station on the South Wales Main Line serving the town of Chipping Sodbury in Gloucestershire.

The station opened on 1 July 1903, and closed to passengers on 3 April 1961, and to goods on 20 June 1966.

Preceding station	Historical railways	Following station
Badminton; Line open, station closed	Great Western Railway; South Wales Main Line	Coalpit Heath; Line open, station closed
