= Hullavington railway station =

Disused railway station in Hullavington, Wiltshire

Hullavington
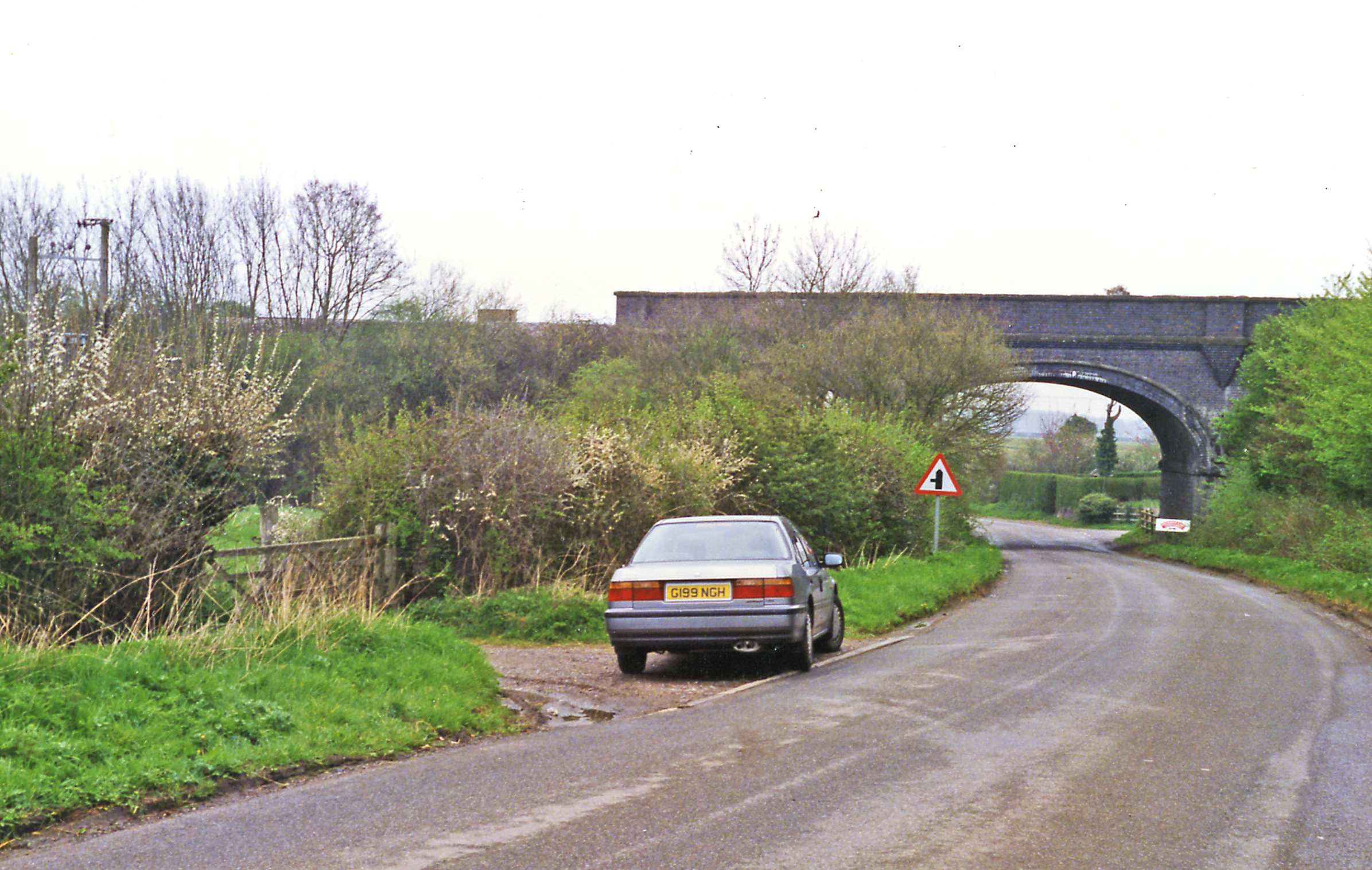
- Near the site of the station, 1995

General information
- Location: Hullavington, Wiltshire; England
- Coordinates: 51.5442°N 2.1459°W
- Grid reference: ST900828
- Platforms: 2

Other information
- Status: Disused

History
- Original company: Great Western Railway

Key dates
- 1 July 1903: Opened
- 3 April 1961: Closed to passengers
- 4 October 1965: Closed completely
Location

Hullavington railway station served the civil parish of Hullavington, Wiltshire, England from 1903 to 1965 on the South Wales Main Line.

== History ==
The station was opened on 1 July 1903 by the Great Western Railway, on an embankment just west of the Hullavington-Norton road, about half a mile north of Hullavington village. There was a goods yard and a weighbridge. The station closed to passengers on 3 April 1961 and to goods traffic on 4 October 1965.

Preceding station	Historical railways	Following station
Little Somerford; Line open, station closed	Great Western Railway; South Wales Main Line	Badminton; Line open, station closed
