= Chipping Sodbury =

Market town in Gloucestershire, England

Coordinates: 51.538°N 2.394°W

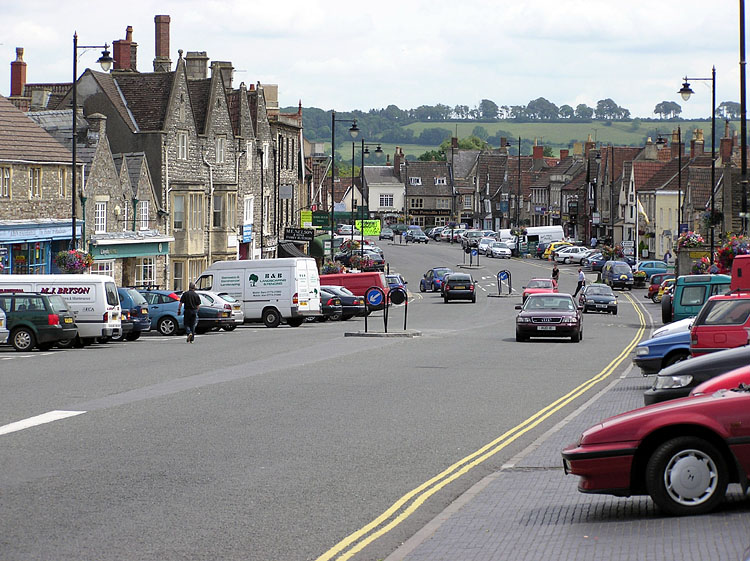
- The wide main street of Chipping Sodbury. Cars are parked where market stalls would once have been.

- Location within Gloucestershire
- Population: 8,025 (2021 Census)
- OS grid reference: ST726822
- Civil parish: Sodbury
- Unitary authority: South Gloucestershire
- Ceremonial county: Gloucestershire
- Region: South West
- Country: England
- Sovereign state: United Kingdom
- Post town: BRISTOL
- Postcode district: BS37
- Dialling code: 01454
- Police: Avon and Somerset
- Fire: Avon
- Ambulance: South Western
- UK Parliament: Thornbury and Yate

Chipping Sodbury is a market town in the unitary authority area of South Gloucestershire, in the county of Gloucestershire, England. It is situated 13 miles (21 km) north-east of Bristol and directly east of Yate. The town was founded in the 12th century by William le Gros. It is the main settlement in the civil parish of Sodbury, which also includes the village of Old Sodbury.

At the 2021 census, the population of Chipping Sodbury was 8,025, but the town has since become part of a larger built-up area due to the rapid expansion of nearby neighbouring town, Yate. The two towns are contiguous with one another.

== Governance ==
Chipping Sodbury is situated in the ward of Chipping Sodbury & Cotswold Edge. The total population of the ward was 10,036 at the 2021 census. In 1931 the parish of Chipping Sodbury had a population of 973. On 1 April 1946 the parish was abolished to form Sodbury.

== Transport ==
East of the town is the Chipping Sodbury Tunnel, a railway tunnel under the Cotswolds 2 miles 924 yards (4.06 km) long, which was opened by the Great Western Railway in 1902. The tunnel is notorious for flooding in wet weather, often leading to disruption of services on the main railway line to and from South Wales. Chipping Sodbury had a station from 1903 to 1961. Yate station, on the Bristol to Birmingham main line, closed in January 1965 but reopened in May 1989.

The WESTlink on-demand bus serves the town.

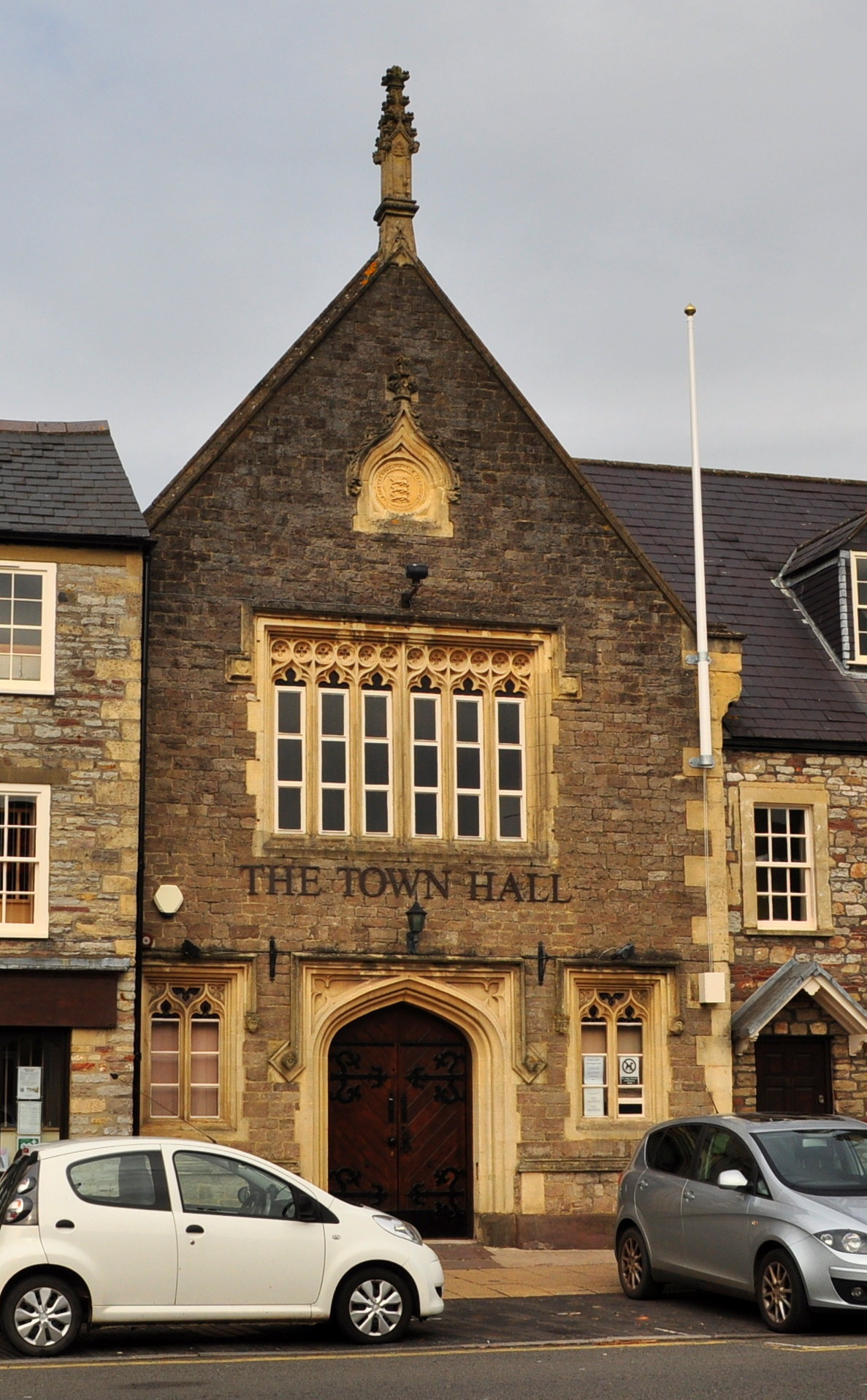
Chipping Sodbury Town Hall

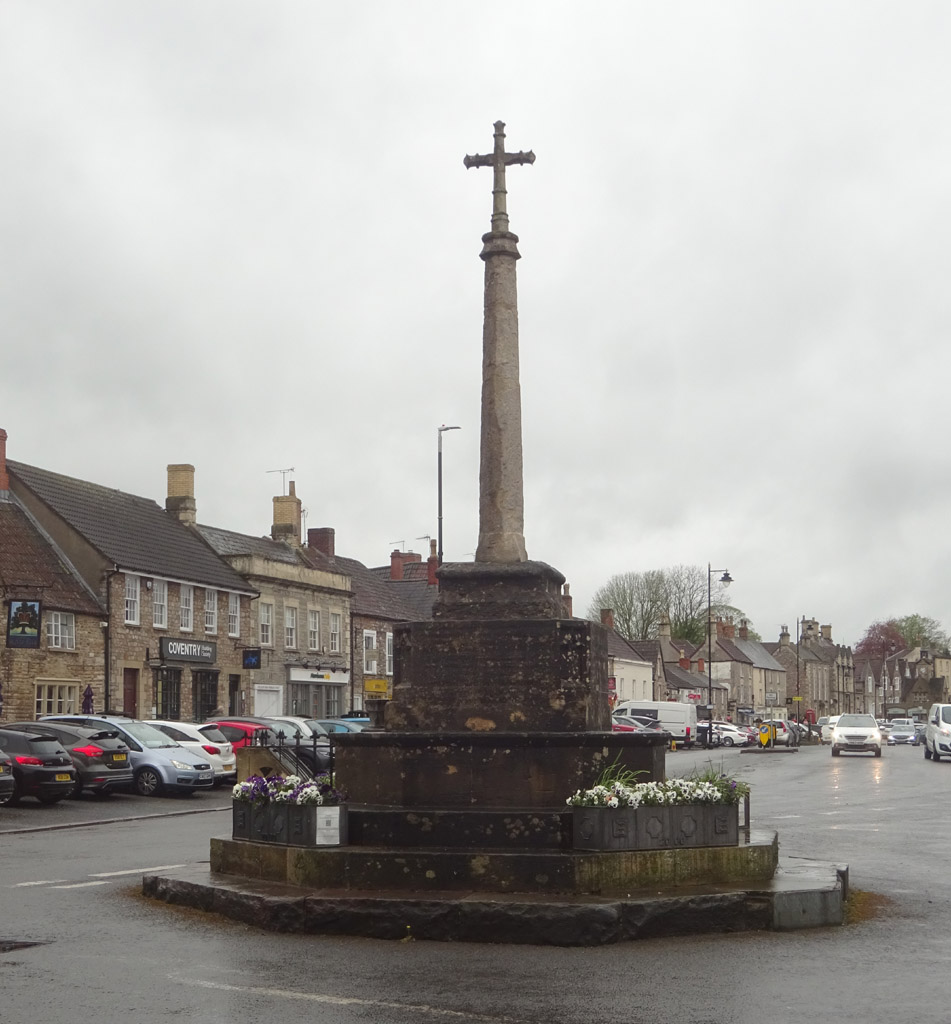
Late 14th century Medieval Town Cross and War Memorial.

== Cultural activities ==
Chipping Sodbury hosts a twice yearly Mop Fair, usually the last weekends of March and September. The town holds a Festival Week in early June, including a "Big Lunch" where the main road is closed and residents bring picnics to eat on the street. There is a farmers' market twice a month, on the second and fourth Saturdays.

A Victorian Day is held on the first Saturday in December.

The town celebrated its 800th anniversary in August 2018.

The town has a community radio station, Thornbury Radio (previously Gloss FM) which broadcasts on DAB and FM as well as online. Chipping Sodbury Town Hall, which was remodelled in 1858, is an events venue. The Town Cross (Market Cross) sits on top of the War Memorial (1919) with a medieval socket base and shaft. The cross (topknot) is 20^{th}C.

== Education ==
Chipping Sodbury has two government funded primary schools and a secondary school.

Chipping Sodbury School, the secondary school, caters for children aged 11 to 18 and describes itself as a 'Specialist Technology School'. The School shares a sixth form, named Cotswold Edge, with both Brimsham Green School and Yate International Academy. Subjects taken by students are split between the three locations. The School obtained a 'Requires Improvement' status from Ofsted in 2018.

St John's Mead Primary School is named after the parish church, St. John's Chipping Sodbury. The other primary school is Raysfield Infants and Junior schools. Also within the parish boundary is Old Sodbury Primary School.

Dodington Parish Hall, which is situated next to Raysfield Junior and Infant Schools, is also the home of Raysfield Preschool.

== Toponymy ==
The town's name is recorded in Old English (in the dative case) as Soppanbyrig = "Soppa's fort". "Chipping" (from Old English cēping) means that a market was held there.

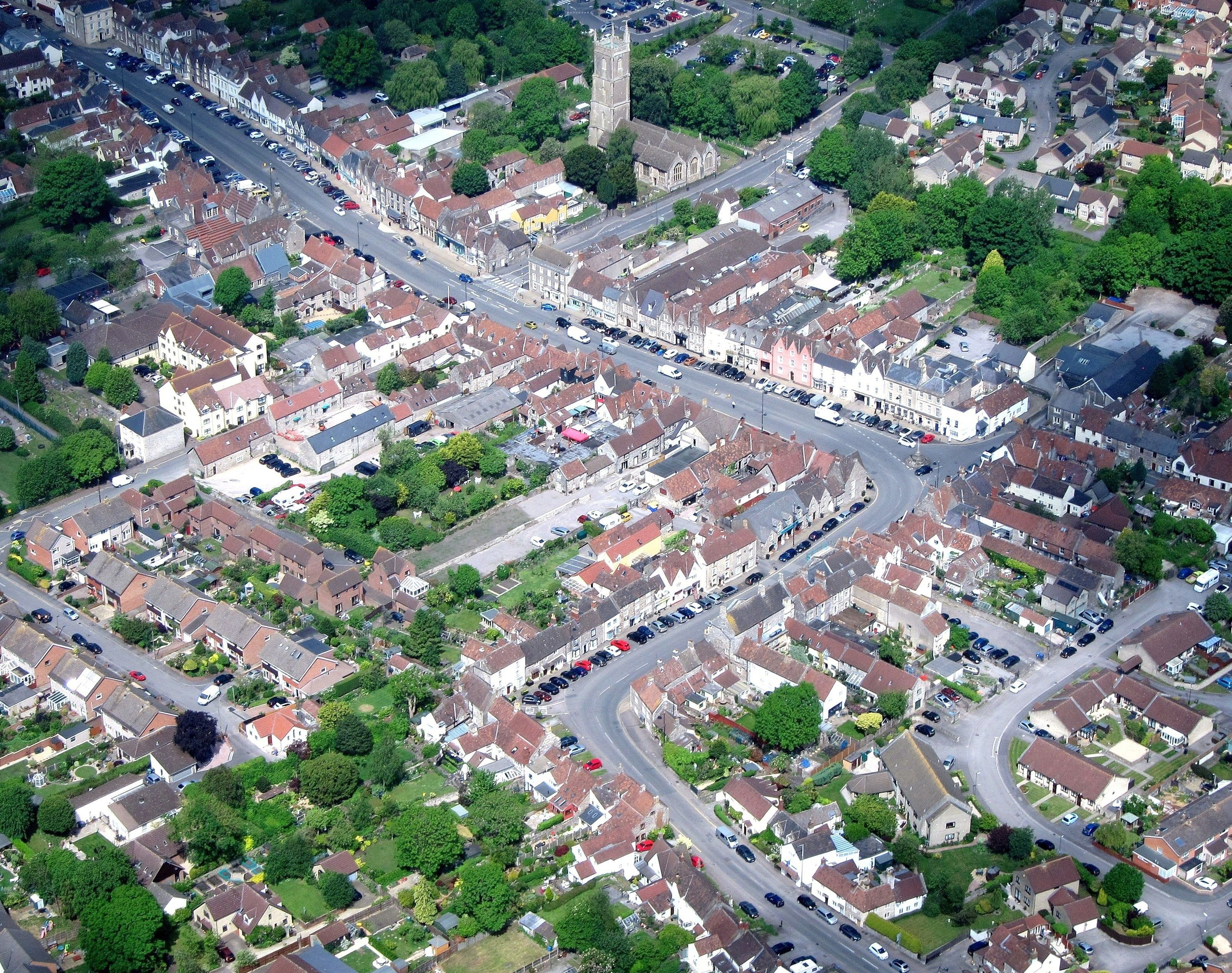
The main street of Chipping Sodbury (2017)

== Notable people ==
Edward Jenner, pioneer of vaccination in the 18th century, started his medical training in Sodbury, apprenticed to an Apothecary George Hardwicke (in Melbourne House, Horse St.). His observation of people catching cowpox and then not catching smallpox. was later in life when he was a practising physician, in Berkeley.

RC "Jack" Russell: former England cricket wicketkeeper and artist owns an art gallery in the town.

Chris Sawyer: creator of the RollerCoaster Tycoon, Transport Tycoon games and Chris Sawyer's Locomotion.

Sir James Dyson, inventor of the Dual Cyclone bagless vacuum cleaner, lives at Dodington Park just outside Chipping Sodbury.

J. K. Rowling, author of the Harry Potter fantasy series, was born in 1965 at the Chipping Sodbury Maternity Hospital (later the Chipping Sodbury Memorial Day Centre), on Station Road, Yate. Until the age of four, she lived with her parents in Sundridge Park, Yate.
