= Alderton Tunnel =

Railway tunnel in Wiltshire, England

Coordinates: 51°32′30″N 2°13′19″W

The Alderton Tunnel sits on the South Wales Main Line in England, on a stretch of line between Swindon and Bristol Parkway. The tunnel, which is 506 yards (463 m (1,519 ft)) long, was opened on 1 January 1903 along with the line between Wootton Bassett Junction and Badminton, that being the first section of the South Wales & Bristol Direct Line of the Great Western Railway.

Building of the tunnel commenced at least two years before 1903, as the rise in railway workers boarding in Alderton village can be seen in the 1901 Census.

As part of the modernisation of the Great Western main line, the route through the tunnel closed from 19 August to 15 September 2017 to allow overhead electrification equipment to be fitted.
