= Badminton railway station =

Railway station in Badminton, South Gloucestershire, England

Badminton
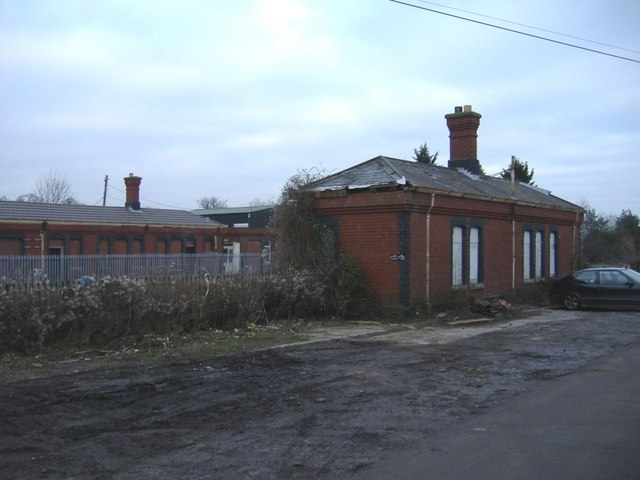

General information
- Location: Badminton, South Gloucestershire; England
- Coordinates: 51.53025°N 2.27552°W
- Platforms: 2

Other information
- Status: Disused

History
- Original company: Great Western Railway
- Pre-grouping: Great Western Railway
- Post-grouping: Great Western Railway

Key dates
- 1 July 1903: Station opened
- 3 June 1968: Station closed
Location

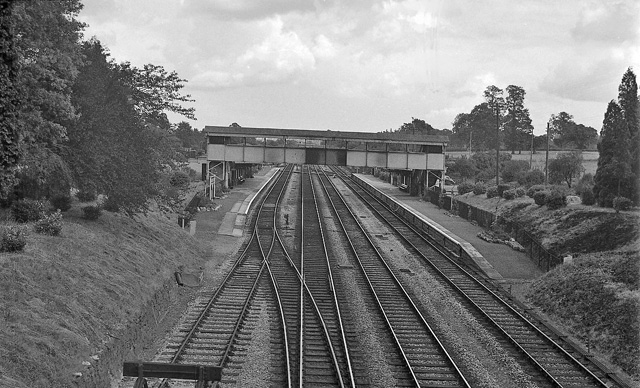
View eastward, towards Swindon in 1961

Badminton railway station is a closed railway station in Gloucestershire, England on the line between Wootton Bassett to the east, and Patchway and Filton to the west. It served the villages of Badminton and Acton Turville.

The station was opened by the Great Western Railway in 1903 and became part of British Railways on 1 January 1948. The station was closed in 1968 but its closure was delayed due to the delay in nulling an agreement with the Duke of Badminton regarding trains stopping at the station.

The station buildings and sections of platforms still stand derelict with trains passing through the site on the South Wales Main Line.

| Preceding station | Historical railways | Following station |
|---|---|---|
| Hullavington | Great Western Railway; South Wales Main Line | Chipping Sodbury |
