= List of United Kingdom locations: Ni-North G =

The United Kingdom

This is part of the list of United Kingdom locations: a gazetteer of place names in the United Kingdom showing each place's locality and geographical coordinates.

== Ni ==
Location	Locality	Coordinates (links to map & photo sources)	OS grid reference
Nib Heath	Shropshire	52.75°N 02.87°W	SJ4118
Nibley	Gloucestershire	51.75°N 02.49°W	SO6606
Nibley	South Gloucestershire	51.53°N 02.44°W	ST6982
Nibley Green	Gloucestershire	51.66°N 02.39°W	ST7396
Nibon	Shetland Islands	60.44°N 01.45°W	HU3073
Nicholashayne	Devon	50.93°N 03.28°W	ST1016
Nicholaston	Swansea	51.57°N 04.13°W	SS5288
Nidd	North Yorkshire	54.02°N 01.54°W	SE3059
Niddrie	City of Edinburgh	55.92°N 03.13°W	NT2971
Nigg	City of Aberdeen	57.10°N 02.10°W	NJ9402
Nigg	Highland	57.71°N 04.01°W	NH8071
Nigg Ferry	Highland	57.68°N 04.03°W	NH7968
Nimble Nook	Oldham	53.53°N 02.15°W	SD9004
Nimlet	South Gloucestershire	51.43°N 02.37°W	ST7471
Nimmer	Somerset	50.88°N 02.96°W	ST3210
Nine Ashes	Essex	51.69°N 00.29°E	TL5902
Ninebanks	Northumberland	54.87°N 02.34°W	NY7853
Nine Elms	Swindon	51.56°N 01.84°W	SU1185
Nine Elms	Wandsworth	51.47°N 00.14°W	TQ2977
Nine Maidens Downs	Cornwall	50.17°N 05.26°W	SW6736
Ninemile Bar or Crocketford	Dumfries and Galloway	55.02°N 03.83°W	NX8372
Nine Oaks	Devon	50.70°N 03.38°W	SY0290
Nineveh (Bayton)	Worcestershire	52.35°N 02.47°W	SO6873
Nineveh (near Tenbury Wells)	Worcestershire	52.27°N 02.55°W	SO6264
Ninewells	City of Dundee	56.44°N 03.03°W	NO3629
Ninewells	Gloucestershire	51.80°N 02.61°W	SO5812
Nine Wells	Pembrokeshire	51.87°N 05.22°W	SM7824
Ninfield	East Sussex	50.88°N 00.41°E	TQ7012
Ningwood	Isle of Wight	50.69°N 01.43°W	SZ4088
Ningwood Common	Isle of Wight	50.69°N 01.44°W	SZ3989
Ninnes	Cornwall	50.15°N 05.57°W	SW4534
Ninnes Bridge	Cornwall	50.16°N 05.48°W	SW5135
Nisbet	Scottish Borders	55.51°N 02.52°W	NT6725
Nista	Shetland Islands	60.36°N 00.89°W	HU609653
Nisthouse	Shetland Islands	60.35°N 00.95°W	HU5864
Nithbank	Dumfries and Galloway	55.24°N 03.77°W	NX8796
Nithside	Dumfries and Galloway	55.06°N 03.63°W	NX9676
Niton	Isle of Wight	50.58°N 01.29°W	SZ5076
Nitshill	East Renfrewshire	55.81°N 04.37°W	NS5160
Niwbwrch	Isle of Anglesey	53.15°N 04.36°W	SH4265

== No ==
=== Noa-Noo ===
Location	Locality	Coordinates (links to map & photo sources)	OS grid reference
Noah's Ark	Kent	51.29°N 00.22°E	TQ5557
Noah's Green	Worcestershire	52.24°N 02.00°W	SP0061
Noak Bridge	Essex	51.58°N 00.43°E	TQ6990
Noak Hill	Essex	51.59°N 00.42°E	TQ6891
Noak Hill	Havering	51.61°N 00.22°E	TQ5493
Nob End	Bolton	53.55°N 02.37°W	SD7506
Nobland Green	Hertfordshire	51.83°N 00.03°E	TL4017
Noblethorpe	Barnsley	53.54°N 01.57°W	SE2805
Nobold	Shropshire	52.68°N 02.78°W	SJ4710
Nobottle	Northamptonshire	52.26°N 01.01°W	SP6763
Nob's Crook	Hampshire	50.98°N 01.31°W	SU4821
Nocton	Lincolnshire	53.16°N 00.43°W	TF0564
Noctorum	Wirral	53.37°N 03.08°W	SJ2887
Nodmore	Berkshire	51.49°N 01.41°W	SU4177
Noel Park	Haringey	51.59°N 00.11°W	TQ3190
Nogdam End	Norfolk	52.54°N 01.52°E	TG3900
Nog Tow	Lancashire	53.79°N 02.76°W	SD5033
Noke	Oxfordshire	51.81°N 01.21°W	SP5413
Noke Street	Kent	51.41°N 00.50°E	TQ7471
Nolton	Pembrokeshire	51.81°N 05.10°W	SM8618
Nolton Haven	Pembrokeshire	51.81°N 05.12°W	SM8518
No Man's Heath	Cheshire	53.02°N 02.73°W	SJ5148
No Man's Heath	Warwickshire	52.66°N 01.58°W	SK2808
No Man's Land	Cornwall	50.383°N 04.43°W	SX2756
No Man's Land	Hampshire	51.05°N 01.28°W	SU5029
Nomansland	Devon	50.90°N 03.66°W	SS8313
Nomansland	Hertfordshire	51.79°N 00.30°W	TL1712
Nomansland	Wiltshire	50.95°N 01.64°W	SU2517
Noneley	Shropshire	52.83°N 02.77°W	SJ4827
No Ness	Shetland Islands	59.97°N 01.21°W	HU440215
Nonikiln	Highland	57.70°N 04.25°W	NH6671
Nonington	Kent	51.22°N 01.22°E	TR2552
Nook	Cumbria	54.22°N 02.70°W	SD5481
Noon Nick	Bradford	53.82°N 01.83°W	SE1136
Noonsbrough	Shetland Islands	60.29°N 01.47°W	HU2957
Noonsun	Cheshire	53.29°N 02.30°W	SJ8078
Noonvares	Cornwall	50.13°N 05.37°W	SW5932

=== Nor-Norr ===
Location	Locality	Coordinates (links to map & photo sources)	OS grid reference
Nor	Kent	51.40°N 00.60°E	TQ815701
Noranside	Angus	56.72°N 02.86°W	NO4760
Norbiton	Kingston upon Thames	51.40°N 00.29°W	TQ1969
Norbreck	Lancashire	53.86°N 03.05°W	SD3141
Norbridge	Herefordshire	52.10°N 02.42°W	SO7145
Norbury	Cheshire	53.01°N 02.67°W	SJ5547
Norbury	Croydon	51.40°N 00.11°W	TQ3169
Norbury	Derbyshire	52.97°N 01.82°W	SK1242
Norbury	Shropshire	52.52°N 02.94°W	SO3692
Norbury	Staffordshire	52.80°N 02.32°W	SJ7823
Norbury Common	Cheshire	53.02°N 02.67°W	SJ5548
Norbury Junction	Staffordshire	52.79°N 02.31°W	SJ7922
Norbury Moor	Stockport	53.37°N 02.13°W	SJ9186
Norby	North Yorkshire	54.23°N 01.35°W	SE4282
Norby	Shetland Islands	60.29°N 01.65°W	HU1957
Norchard	Worcestershire	52.31°N 02.23°W	SO8468
Norcote	Gloucestershire	51.71°N 01.94°W	SP0402
Norcott Brook	Cheshire	53.31°N 02.58°W	SJ6180
Norcross	Lancashire	53.86°N 03.03°W	SD3241
Nordelph	Norfolk	52.57°N 00.28°E	TF5500
Nordelph Corner	Norfolk	52.58°N 00.99°E	TG0303
Norden	Dorset	50.64°N 02.08°W	SY9483
Norden	Rochdale	53.62°N 02.22°W	SD8514
Nordley	Shropshire	52.56°N 02.45°W	SO6996
Norham	Northumberland	55.71°N 02.16°W	NT9047
Norham West Mains	Northumberland	55.72°N 02.14°W	NT9148
Nork	Surrey	51.31°N 00.23°W	TQ2359
Norland Town	Calderdale	53.69°N 01.89°W	SE0722
Norleaze	Wiltshire	51.27°N 02.20°W	ST8653
Norley	Cheshire	53.24°N 02.66°W	SJ5672
Norley	Devon	50.78°N 04.12°W	SS5000
Norley Common	Surrey	51.18°N 00.54°W	TQ0244
Norleywood	Hampshire	50.77°N 01.50°W	SZ3597
Norlington	East Sussex	50.89°N 00.04°E	TQ4413
Normacot	City of Stoke-on-Trent	52.97°N 02.12°W	SJ9242
Normanby	North Lincolnshire	53.63°N 00.67°W	SE8816
Normanby	North Yorkshire	54.22°N 00.88°W	SE7381
Normanby	Redcar and Cleveland	54.55°N 01.15°W	NZ5518
Normanby-by-Spital	Lincolnshire	53.37°N 00.49°W	TF0088
Normanby by Stow	Lincolnshire	53.33°N 00.67°W	SK8883
Normanby le Wold	Lincolnshire	53.44°N 00.31°W	TF1295
Norman Cross	Cambridgeshire	52.49°N 00.30°W	TL1590
Normandy	Surrey	51.25°N 00.68°W	SU9251
Norman Hill	Gloucestershire	51.68°N 02.36°W	ST7599
Normans Bay	East Sussex	50.82°N 00.38°E	TQ6805
Norman's Green	Devon	50.81°N 03.35°W	ST0503
Normanston	Suffolk	52.47°N 01.72°E	TM5393
Normanton	City of Derby	52.89°N 01.49°W	SK3433
Normanton	Lincolnshire	53.00°N 00.60°W	SK9446
Normanton	Nottinghamshire	53.07°N 00.95°W	SK7054
Normanton	Rutland	52.64°N 00.62°W	SK9306
Normanton	Wakefield	53.69°N 01.42°W	SE3822
Normanton	Wiltshire	51.15°N 01.81°W	SU1340
Normanton le Heath	Leicestershire	52.70°N 01.45°W	SK3712
Normanton-on-Cliffe	Leicestershire	52.95°N 00.79°W	SK8140
Normanton on Soar	Nottinghamshire	52.80°N 01.24°W	SK5123
Normanton-on-the-Wolds	Nottinghamshire	52.89°N 01.07°W	SK6233
Normanton on Trent	Nottinghamshire	53.20°N 00.81°W	SK7968
Normanton Spring	Sheffield	53.35°N 01.40°W	SK4084
Normanton Turville	Leicestershire	52.57°N 01.27°W	SP4998
Normoss	Lancashire	53.82°N 03.00°W	SD3437
Norney	Surrey	51.18°N 00.65°W	SU9444
Norr	Bradford	53.82°N 01.86°W	SE0936
Norrington Common	Wiltshire	51.37°N 02.17°W	ST8864
Norris Green	Cornwall	50.49°N 04.24°W	SX4169
Norris Green	Liverpool	53.43°N 02.91°W	SJ3994
Norris Hill	Leicestershire	52.74°N 01.52°W	SK3216
Norristhorpe	Kirklees	53.69°N 01.69°W	SE2022

=== Northa - North G ===
Location	Locality	Coordinates (links to map & photo sources)	OS grid reference
Northacre	Norfolk	52.54°N 00.87°E	TL9598
North Acton	Ealing	51.52°N 00.27°W	TQ2082
Northall	Buckinghamshire	51.87°N 00.62°W	SP9520
Northallerton	North Yorkshire	54.34°N 01.43°W	SE3794
Northall Green	Norfolk	52.68°N 00.94°E	TF9914
Northam	Devon	51.03°N 04.22°W	SS4429
Northam	City of Southampton	50.90°N 01.38°W	SU4312
Northampton	Northamptonshire	52.24°N 00.90°W	SP7561
North Anston	Rotherham	53.35°N 01.22°W	SK5284
North Ascot	Berkshire	51.41°N 00.70°W	SU9069
North Aston	Oxfordshire	51.95°N 01.31°W	SP4729
Northaw	Hertfordshire	51.70°N 00.14°W	TL2802
Northay	Devon	50.79°N 02.90°W	ST3600
Northay	Somerset	50.89°N 03.02°W	ST2811
North Aywick	Shetland Islands	60.56°N 01.03°W	HU5387
North Baddesley	Hampshire	50.96°N 01.44°W	SU3919
North Ballachulish	Highland	56.69°N 05.18°W	NN0560
North Barrow	Somerset	51.05°N 02.57°W	ST6029
North Barsham	Norfolk	52.86°N 00.83°E	TF9134
Northbeck	Lincolnshire	52.95°N 00.37°W	TF0941
North Beer	Cornwall	50.70°N 04.40°W	SX3092
North Benelip	Shetland Islands	60.40°N 00.79°W	HU665695
North Benfleet	Essex	51.57°N 00.52°E	TQ7589
North Bersted	West Sussex	50.79°N 00.69°W	SU9200
North Berwick	East Lothian	56.05°N 02.72°W	NT5585
North Binness Island	Hampshire	50.83°N 01.00°W	SU701045
North Bitchburn	Durham	54.68°N 01.73°W	NZ1732
North Blyth	Northumberland	55.13°N 01.51°W	NZ3182
North Boarhunt	Hampshire	50.88°N 01.14°W	SU6010
North Bockhampton	Dorset	50.77°N 01.76°W	SZ1797
North Boisdale	Western Isles	57.12°N 07.39°W	NF7417
Northborough	Cambridgeshire	52.64°N 00.30°W	TF1507
Northbourne	Bournemouth	50.75°N 01.88°W	SZ0895
Northbourne	Kent	51.21°N 01.33°E	TR3352
North Bovey	Devon	50.63°N 03.79°W	SX7383
North Bowood	Dorset	50.78°N 02.79°W	SY4499
North Bradley	Wiltshire	51.29°N 02.21°W	ST8555
North Brentor	Devon	50.60°N 04.14°W	SX4881
North Brewham	Somerset	51.12°N 02.40°W	ST7236
Northbridge Street	East Sussex	50.98°N 00.46°E	TQ7324
Northbrook	Dorset	50.74°N 02.35°W	SY7594
Northbrook (Bishop's Waltham)	Hampshire	50.95°N 01.21°W	SU5518
Northbrook (Micheldever)	Hampshire	51.14°N 01.27°W	SU5139
Northbrook	Oxfordshire	51.89°N 01.28°W	SP4922
Northbrook	Wiltshire	51.28°N 01.98°W	SU0154
North Brook End	Cambridgeshire	52.07°N 00.11°W	TL2944
North Broomage	Falkirk	56.02°N 03.84°W	NS8583
North Buckland	Devon	51.13°N 04.18°W	SS4740
North Burlingham	Norfolk	52.63°N 01.50°E	TG3710
North Cadbury	Somerset	51.04°N 02.52°W	ST6327
North Camp	Hampshire	51.26°N 00.75°W	SU8753
North Carlton	Lincolnshire	53.28°N 00.59°W	SK9477
North Carlton	Nottinghamshire	53.35°N 01.11°W	SK5984
North Cave	East Riding of Yorkshire	53.77°N 00.65°W	SE8932
North Cerney	Gloucestershire	51.77062°N 01.97183°W	SP0207
North Chailey	East Sussex	50.97°N 00.02°W	TQ3921
Northchapel	West Sussex	51.05°N 00.64°W	SU9529
North Charford	Hampshire	50.97°N 01.73°W	SU1919
North Charlton	Northumberland	55.49°N 01.74°W	NU1622
North Cheam	Sutton	51.37°N 00.21°W	TQ2465
North Cheriton	Somerset	51.02°N 02.44°W	ST6925
North Chideock	Dorset	50.74°N 02.82°W	SY4294
Northchurch	Hertfordshire	51.76°N 00.59°W	SP9708
North Cliffe	East Riding of Yorkshire	53.82°N 00.67°W	SE8737
North Clifton	Nottinghamshire	53.23°N 00.77°W	SK8272
North Close	Durham	54.68°N 01.59°W	NZ2632
North Cockerington	Lincolnshire	53.38°N 00.05°E	TF3790
North Coker	Somerset	50.91°N 02.67°W	ST5313
North Collafirth	Shetland Islands	60.53°N 01.38°W	HU3483
North Common	East Sussex	50.97°N 00.03°W	TQ3821
North Common	South Gloucestershire	51.44°N 02.47°W	ST6772
North Common	Suffolk	52.33°N 00.89°E	TL9775
North Connel	Argyll and Bute	56.45°N 05.39°W	NM9134
North Cornelly	Bridgend	51.51°N 03.71°W	SS8181
North Corner	Cornwall	50.02°N 05.10°W	SW7818
North Corner	South Gloucestershire	51.53°N 02.50°W	ST6582
North Corriegills	North Ayrshire	55.56°N 05.12°W	NS0335
Northcote	Devon	50.80°N 03.17°W	ST1701
North Cotes	Lincolnshire	53.48°N 00.01°E	TA3400
Northcott	Cornwall	50.84°N 04.54°W	SS2108
Northcott (Sheldon, East Devon)	Devon	50.87°N 03.26°W	ST1109
Northcott (Uffculme, Mid Deven)	Devon	50.90°N 03.29°W	ST0912
Northcott (parish, Torridge district)	Devon	50.70°N 04.36°W	SX3392
North Country	Cornwall	50.24°N 05.24°W	SW6943
Northcourt	Oxfordshire	51.67°N 01.27°W	SU5098
North Cove	Suffolk	52.44°N 01.61°E	TM4689
North Cowton	North Yorkshire	54.42°N 01.56°W	NZ2803
North Craigo	Angus	56.75°N 02.52°W	NO6863
North Crawley	Milton Keynes	52.08°N 00.65°W	SP9244
North Cray	Bexley	51.42°N 00.14°E	TQ4972
North Creake	Norfolk	52.90°N 00.74°E	TF8538
North Curry	Somerset	51.02°N 02.97°W	ST3225
Northdale	Shetland Islands	60.79°N 00.82°W	HP6413
North Dalton	East Riding of Yorkshire	53.95°N 00.58°W	SE9352
North Darley	Cornwall	50.53°N 04.44°W	SX2773
North Deighton	North Yorkshire	53.95°N 01.40°W	SE3951
North Denes	Norfolk	52.62°N 01.72°E	TG5210
Northdown	Kent	51.37°N 01.40°E	TR3770
North Dronley	Angus	56.51°N 03.09°W	NO3336
North Duffield	North Yorkshire	53.82°N 00.96°W	SE6837
Northdyke	Orkney Islands	59.06°N 03.34°W	HY2320
North Dykes	Cumbria	54.72°N 02.71°W	NY5437
North Eastling	Kent	51.27°N 00.80°E	TQ9657
Northedge	Derbyshire	53.18°N 01.46°W	SK3665
North Elham	Kent	51.15°N 01.11°E	TR1844
North Elkington	Lincolnshire	53.39°N 00.07°W	TF2890
North Elmham	Norfolk	52.74°N 00.93°E	TF9820
North Elmsall	Wakefield	53.60°N 01.29°W	SE4712
North Elphinstone	East Lothian	55.91°N 02.97°W	NT3970
North End (Clutton)	Bath and North East Somerset	51.33°N 02.54°W	ST6260
North End (Stagsden)	Bedfordshire	52.13°N 00.58°W	SP9749
North End (Bletsoe)	Bedfordshire	52.22°N 00.50°W	TL0259
North End	Berkshire	51.36°N 01.42°W	SU4063
North End	Bexley	51.46°N 00.17°E	TQ5176
North End (Steeple Claydon)	Buckinghamshire	51.93°N 00.98°W	SP7027
North End (Stewkley)	Buckinghamshire	51.93°N 00.77°W	SP8427
North End	Camden	51.56°N 00.18°W	TQ2687
North End	Cumbria	54.92°N 03.06°W	NY3259
North End	Devon	50.93°N 03.28°W	ST1016
North End	Dorset	51.04°N 02.22°W	ST8427
North End	Durham	54.78°N 01.59°W	NZ2643
North End (Bewholme)	East Riding of Yorkshire	53.93°N 00.23°W	TA1650
North End (Roos)	East Riding of Yorkshire	53.76°N 00.05°W	TA2831
North End (Withernwick)	East Riding of Yorkshire	53.85°N 00.19°W	TA1941
North End (Little Yeldham)	Essex	52.02°N 00.59°E	TL7839
North End (Great Waltham)	Essex	51.83°N 00.40°E	TL6618
North End (Cheriton)	Hampshire	51.05°N 01.17°W	SU5829
North End (Damerham)	Hampshire	50.94°N 01.85°W	SU1016
North End	Leicestershire	52.72°N 01.15°W	SK5715
North End (Saltfleetby St Peter)	Lincolnshire	53.37°N 00.13°E	TF4289
North End (Mablethorpe)	Lincolnshire	53.35°N 00.23°E	TF4987
North End (Alvingham)	Lincolnshire	53.40°N 00.02°E	TF3592
North End (South Kelsey)	Lincolnshire	53.47°N 00.43°W	TF0499
North End (Tetney)	Lincolnshire	53.48°N 00.02°W	TA3101
North End (Swineshead)	Lincolnshire	52.95°N 00.17°W	TF2341
North End (Goxhill)	Lincolnshire	53.68°N 00.33°W	TA1022
North End	Norfolk	52.48°N 00.94°E	TM0092
North End	Northumberland	55.30°N 01.79°W	NU1301
North End	City of Portsmouth	50.81°N 01.07°W	SU6502
North End (Creech St Michael)	Somerset	51.02°N 03.04°W	ST2726
North End (Yatton)	Somerset	51.39°N 02.84°W	ST4167
North End (East Grinstead)	West Sussex	51.13°N 00.04°W	TQ3739
North End (Yapton)	West Sussex	50.82°N 00.60°W	SU9804
North End (Findon)	West Sussex	50.87°N 00.42°W	TQ1109
North End	Wiltshire	51.64°N 01.94°W	SU0494
Northend	Bath and North East Somerset	51.41°N 02.31°W	ST7868
Northend	Buckinghamshire	51.62°N 00.94°W	SU7392
Northend (Southminster)	Essex	51.66°N 00.81°E	TL9500
Northend (Saffron Walden)	Essex	52.02°N 00.21°E	TL5239
Northend	Warwickshire	52.16°N 01.43°W	SP3952
Northenden	Manchester	53.40°N 02.27°W	SJ8290
Northern Moor	Manchester	53.40°N 02.28°W	SJ8190
North Erradale	Highland	57.76°N 05.80°W	NG7481
North Evington	City of Leicester	52.63°N 01.10°W	SK6104
North Ewster	North Lincolnshire	53.51°N 00.74°W	SE8303
Northey Island	Essex	51.72°N 00.71°E	TL879065
North Fambridge	Essex	51.64°N 00.67°E	TQ8597
North Featherstone	Wakefield	53.69°N 01.36°W	SE4222
North Feltham	Hounslow	51.45°N 00.41°W	TQ1074
North Feorline	North Ayrshire	55.50°N 05.32°W	NR9028
North Ferriby	East Riding of Yorkshire	53.71°N 00.51°W	SE9825
Northfield	City of Aberdeen	57.16°N 02.16°W	NJ9008
Northfield	Birmingham	52.40°N 01.97°W	SP0279
Northfield	East Riding of Yorkshire	53.72°N 00.44°W	TA0326
Northfield	City of Edinburgh	55.94°N 03.13°W	NT2973
Northfield	Milton Keynes	52.05°N 00.71°W	SP8840
Northfield	Northamptonshire	52.52°N 00.68°W	SP8993
Northfield (Eildon)	Scottish Borders	55.55°N 02.69°W	NT5629
Northfield (St Abbs)	Scottish Borders	55.89°N 02.14°W	NT9167
Northfield	Somerset	51.11°N 03.03°W	ST2836
Northfields	Hampshire	51.02°N 01.31°W	SU4825
North Finchley	Barnet	51.61°N 00.18°W	TQ2692
Northfleet	Kent	51.44°N 00.32°E	TQ6274
Northfleet Green	Kent	51.41°N 00.32°E	TQ6271
North Flobbets	Aberdeenshire	57.39°N 02.35°W	NJ7934
North Foreland	Kent	51.36°N 01.44°E	TR4069
North Frodingham	East Riding of Yorkshire	53.96°N 00.32°W	TA1053
Northgate	Lincolnshire	52.81°N 00.23°W	TF1926
Northgate	Somerset	51.04°N 03.31°W	ST0828
Northgate	West Sussex	51.12°N 00.18°W	TQ2738
North Glendale	Western Isles	57.13°N 07.30°W	NF7917
North Gluss	Shetland Islands	60.47°N 01.38°W	HU3477
North Gorley	Hampshire	50.89°N 01.77°W	SU1611
North Green (Pulham St Mary)	Norfolk	52.44°N 01.26°E	TM2288
North Green (Garvestone)	Norfolk	52.61°N 00.98°E	TG0206
North Green (Cratfield)	Suffolk	52.33°N 01.37°E	TM3076
North Green (Kelsale)	Suffolk	52.24°N 01.49°E	TM3966
North Green (Parham)	Suffolk	52.20°N 01.37°E	TM3162
North Greenwich	Greenwich	51.498°N 00.006°E	TQ392796
North Greetwell	Lincolnshire	53.24°N 00.48°W	TF0173
North Grimston	North Yorkshire	54.09°N 00.71°W	SE8467
