= Nineveh (disambiguation) =

Nineveh was an ancient Middle Eastern city founded by the Assyrians.

Nineveh may also refer to:

- Nineveh Governorate, a province of Iraq

== Places ==
=== United States ===
- Nineveh Township, Johnson County, Indiana
  - Nineveh, Indiana, an unincorporated community
- Nineveh Creek, a river in Indiana
- Nineveh Township, Adair County, Missouri
  - Nineveh, Missouri, an unincorporated community
- Nineveh Township, Lincoln County, Missouri
- Nineveh, New York, an unincorporated hamlet
- Nineveh, Pennsylvania, an unincorporated community
- Nineveh, Virginia, an unincorporated community

=== Elsewhere ===
- Nineveh, Lunenburg, Nova Scotia, Canada, a community
- Nineveh, an unincorporated place in the Municipality of the County of Victoria, Nova Scotia, Canada
- Nineveh, England, three minor places in Worcestershire and Staffordshire

== Military ==
- Battle of Nineveh (disambiguation)
  - Battle of Nineveh (612 BC), the fall of Assyria
  - Battle of Nineveh (627), the climactic battle of the Byzantine-Sassanid War
- Nineveh S. McKeen (1837–1890), American Civil War officer awarded the Medal of Honor

== Music ==
- "Nineveh" (song) by Brooke Ligertwood, 2022

== See also ==
- Isaac of Nineveh (c. 613–c. 700), Syriac Christian bishop, theologian and saint
