= Nibley =

Nibley may refer to:

== Places ==
in England

- Nibley, Forest of Dean, a location in Gloucestershire that is part of Blakeney
- Nibley, South Gloucestershire, Gloucestershire, near Yate
- North Nibley, commonly known as Nibley, a village in the Stroud district of Gloucestershire, near Wotton-under-Edge
  - Battle of Nibley Green
  - Nibley Monument

in the United States

- Nibley, Oregon
- Nibley, Utah

== People with the surname ==
- Charles W. Nibley (1849–1931), bishop of the Church of Jesus Christ of Latter Day Saints
- Hugh Nibley (1910–2005), Mormon academic and author
- Reid N. Nibley (1923–2008), American pianist and composer
- Richard Nibley (1913–1979), American musician
- Sloan Nibley (1908–1990), American screenwriter
- Christopher Sloan Nibley (1948-) Director of Photography, Photographer
