= Ninnes =

Ninnes is the name of several places:

- Ninnes, Cornwall
- Ninnes Bridge, Cornwall
- Ninnes, South Australia, locality and former village
  - District Council of Ninnes, former local government
  - Hundred of Ninnes, cadastral division
