= Battle of Tal Afar =

Battle of Tal Afar may refer to:

- Battle of Tal Afar (2005), also known as Operation Restoring Rights, by U.S. and Iraq against Al Qaeda
- Battle of Tal Afar (2017), by Iraq against ISIL

== See also ==
- Battle of Nineveh (disambiguation)
- Battle of Mosul (disambiguation)
