= Morris Township, Pennsylvania =

Morris Township is the name of some places in the U.S. state of Pennsylvania:

- Morris Township, Clearfield County, Pennsylvania
- Morris Township, Greene County, Pennsylvania
- Morris Township, Huntingdon County, Pennsylvania
- Morris Township, Tioga County, Pennsylvania
- Morris Township, Washington County, Pennsylvania
