= Nineveh Township =

Nineveh Township may refer to the following townships in the United States:

- Nineveh Township, Johnson County, Indiana
- Nineveh Township, Adair County, Missouri
- Nineveh Township, Lincoln County, Missouri
