= Edward Leech (MP) =

English lawyer and politician

Sir Edward Leech (or Leche; 1572–1652) was an English lawyer and politician who sat in the House of Commons between 1614 and 1625.

== Biography ==
In 1614, Leche was elected Member of Parliament for Lostwithiel. He was elected Member of Parliament for Derby in 1621. He was of Cheshire when he was knighted by King James at Windsor on 9 September 1621 and about this time became Master in Chancery. He was re-elected MP for Derby in 1624 and in 1625. He owned property in Derbyshire at Chatsworth, Shipley Hall and Belper.

Leech died in Drury Lane, London, 1652, at the age of about 80.

== Family ==
Great-grandfather of Edward Leche was John V Jankin de Leche of Carden (1403-1492 or 1422-1485), Esq., Deputy Sheriff of Chester (1464), who owned moorlands in Carden, Clutton and Aldersy as the vassal of lords Stanley, earl of Chester. The Leech family is descended from a certain Jоhn Leche «Irlonde», the surgeon of Edward III.

In 1377, John "Irlonde" Leche was granted a patent on the possession of the castle Warin (Warden) in Kildare in Ireland, and in 1386 the moorlands near Stretton, Farndon and Coddington by Edward III.

Edward Leche married firstly Jane Chaworth, daughter of John Chaworth of Nottinghamshire and sister of George Chaworth, 1st Viscount Chaworth and secondly, Jane, daughter of Oliver Lambart, 1st Baron Lambart of Cavan (d 1618).

His eldest son, Sir William Leche (1624-1676), was of Shipley Hall, Derbyshire and Squerryes Court, Westerham, Kent. A second son, Robert, was admitted at Gray's Inn in 1653. His daughter Dorothy married Sir James Long, 2nd Baronet. By his second wife, he had a daughter, Rose (1637-1689), who married Edward Smyth of Nibley House, North Nibley.

Parliament of England
| Preceded by Sir Thomas Chaloner; Sir William Lower | Member of Parliament for Lostwithiel; 1614; With: Sir Henry Vane | Succeeded by Edward Salter; George Chudleigh |
| Preceded by Sir Gilbert Kniveton; Arthur Turner | Member of Parliament for Derby; 1621–1625; With: Timothy Leeving | Succeeded by Sir Henry Crofts; John Thoroughgood |
