= St Nicholas Church, Normanton =

Coordinates: 53.005°N 0.5874°W

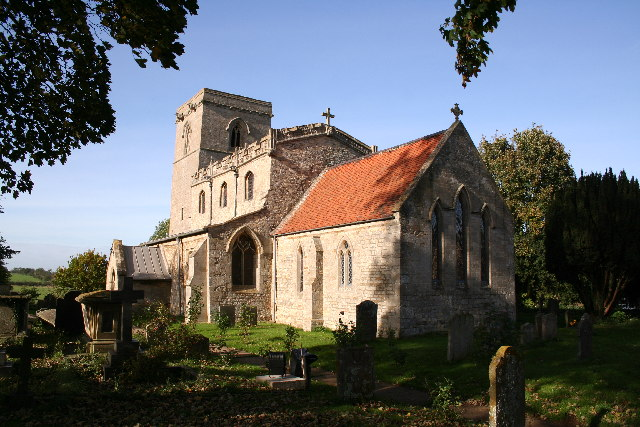
- St Nicholas Church from the southeast

- Location in Lincolnshire
- OS grid reference: SK 948 463
- Location: Normanton-on-Cliffe, Lincolnshire
- Country: England
- Denomination: Anglican
- Website: Churches Conservation Trust

History
- Dedication: Saint Nicholas

Architecture
- Functional status: Redundant
- Heritage designation: Grade II*
- Designated: 20 September 1966
- Architectural type: Church
- Style: Norman, Gothic, Gothic Revival

Specifications
- Materials: Limestone and ironstone Lead, tile and slate roofs

St Nicholas Church is a redundant Anglican church in Normanton-on-Cliffe, Lincolnshire, England. It is recorded in the National Heritage List for England as a designated Grade II* listed building, and is under the care of the Churches Conservation Trust. It stands beside the road between Grantham and Lincoln.

== History ==
The church dates from the 11th century, with additions and alterations made during each of the following four centuries. Further changes were made in 1845 when the vestry was added, and the chancel and the north wall of the nave were largely rebuilt. The church was declared redundant in February 1974.

== Architecture ==
=== Exterior ===
Constructed in limestone and ironstone rubble, the church has ashlar dressings. Its roofs are covered in lead, tiles and slates. The plan consists of a three-bay nave with a clerestory, north and south aisles, and a south porch, a two-bay chancel at a lower level with a north vestry, and a west tower. The tower is in three stages separated by string courses, and has a splayed base. At its top is a carved corbel table and a plain parapet. In the lowest stage is a three-light west window. This is decorated with ball flowers, and in the centre of its tracery is a carved head. The middle stage contains a small window with a trefoil head in each side and on each side of the top stage is a two-light bell opening.

The north wall of the north aisle contains two two-light windows and buttresses, and in its west wall is a lancet window. The north wall of the clerestory also contains two windows. Its parapet is battlemented, it is decorated with carved shields, there are two gargoyles, and the bases of pinnacles which are no longer present. The east wall of the nave is also battlemented and has a cross finial at the apex of its gable. At the east end of the chancel is another cross finial, and three lancet windows. On the south wall of the chancel are a two-light window and a lancet window, separated by a buttress. In the east and south walls of the south aisles are two-light windows, and the window in the west wall is a lancet. The south wall has three windows, similar to those in the north wall. Inside the south porch are stone benches.

=== Interior ===
Both arcades have two bays. The south arcade is Norman in style and dates from the late 12th century. It is carried on circular piers. The north arcade is from the late 13th century and has octagonal piers. The tower arch dates from the late 12th century, and the chancel arch from the 13th century. In the chancel is a 19th-century piscina and aumbry. The hexagonal pulpit is from the 17th century, over which is a tester. The pews date from the 19th century. Over the tower arch are the Royal arms of George IV. On the walls of the tower are a commandment board from the mid-19th century and a benefactors' board dated 1758. The font is from the 12th century. It is plain and consists of a circular bowl on a round base. In the west window are fragments of 14th-century glass. Commemorated by plaque, electric lighting was first installed by resident Thomas Chambers in memory of his only son, John, who died in the Second World War aged 20.

== External features ==
The churchyard contains the war grave of a Royal Field Artillery soldier of the First World War.

== Gallery ==
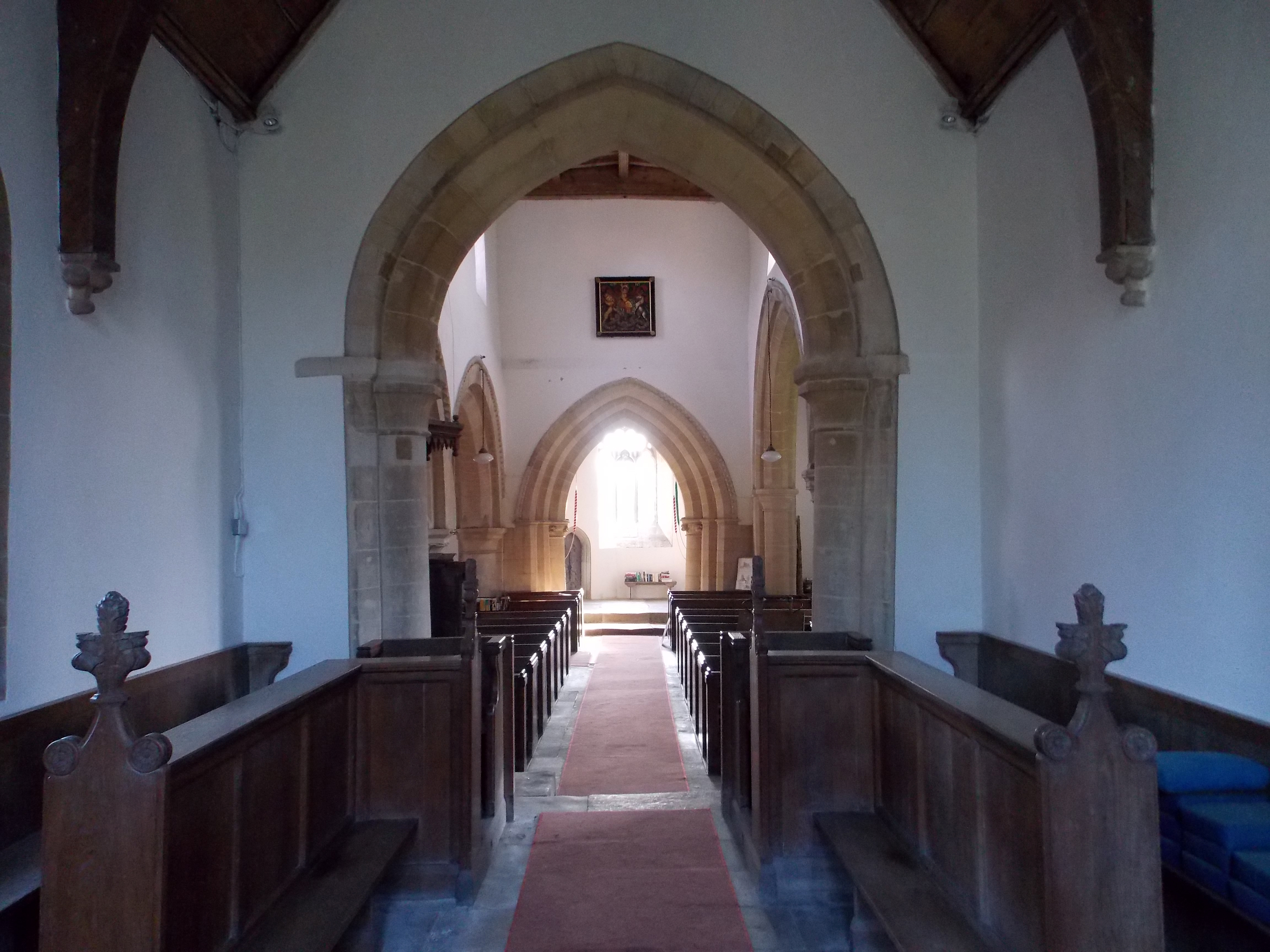
St Nicholas chancel, nave, and tower arch from the chancel east window

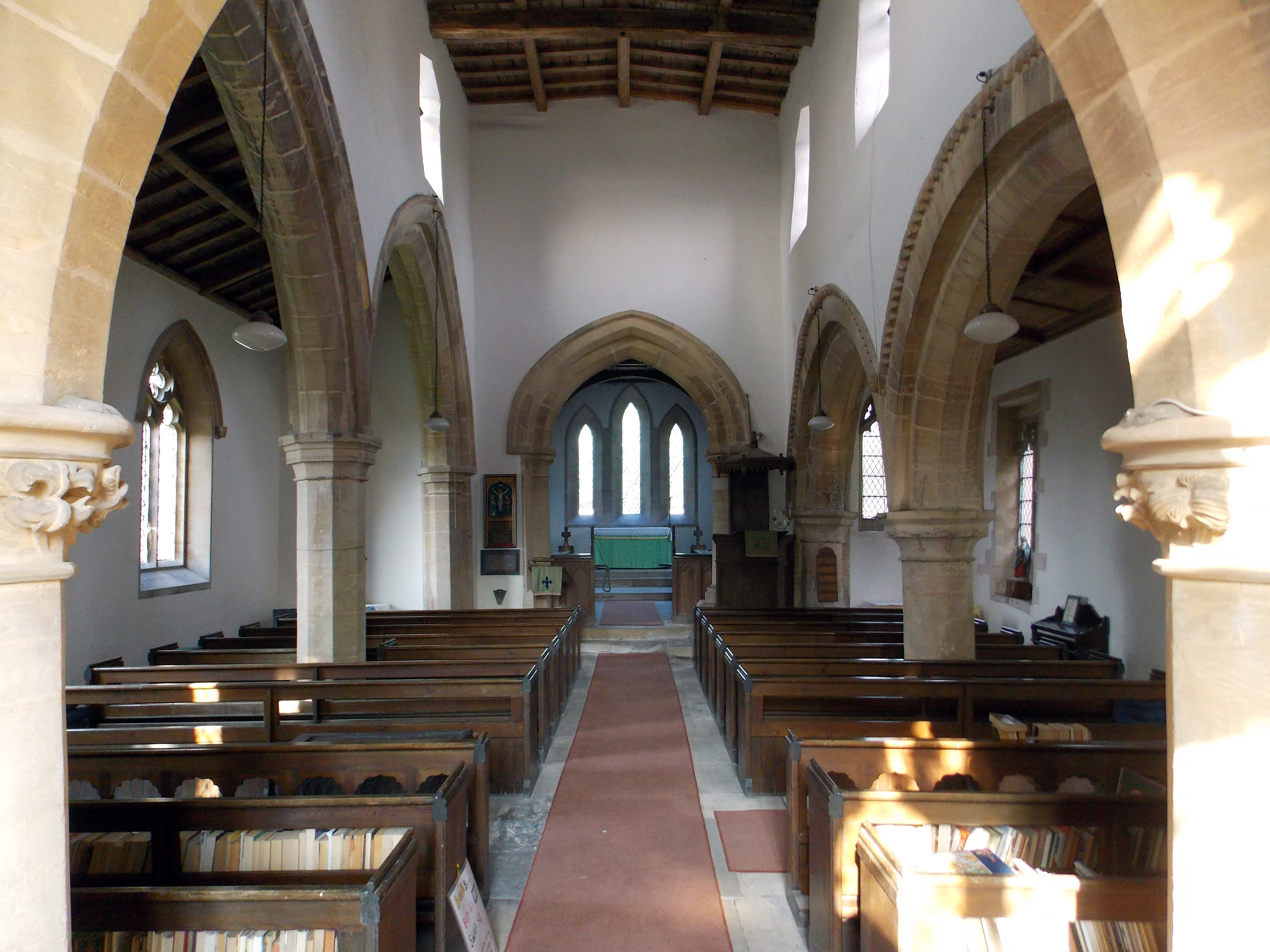
St Nicholas nave and chancel from the tower arch

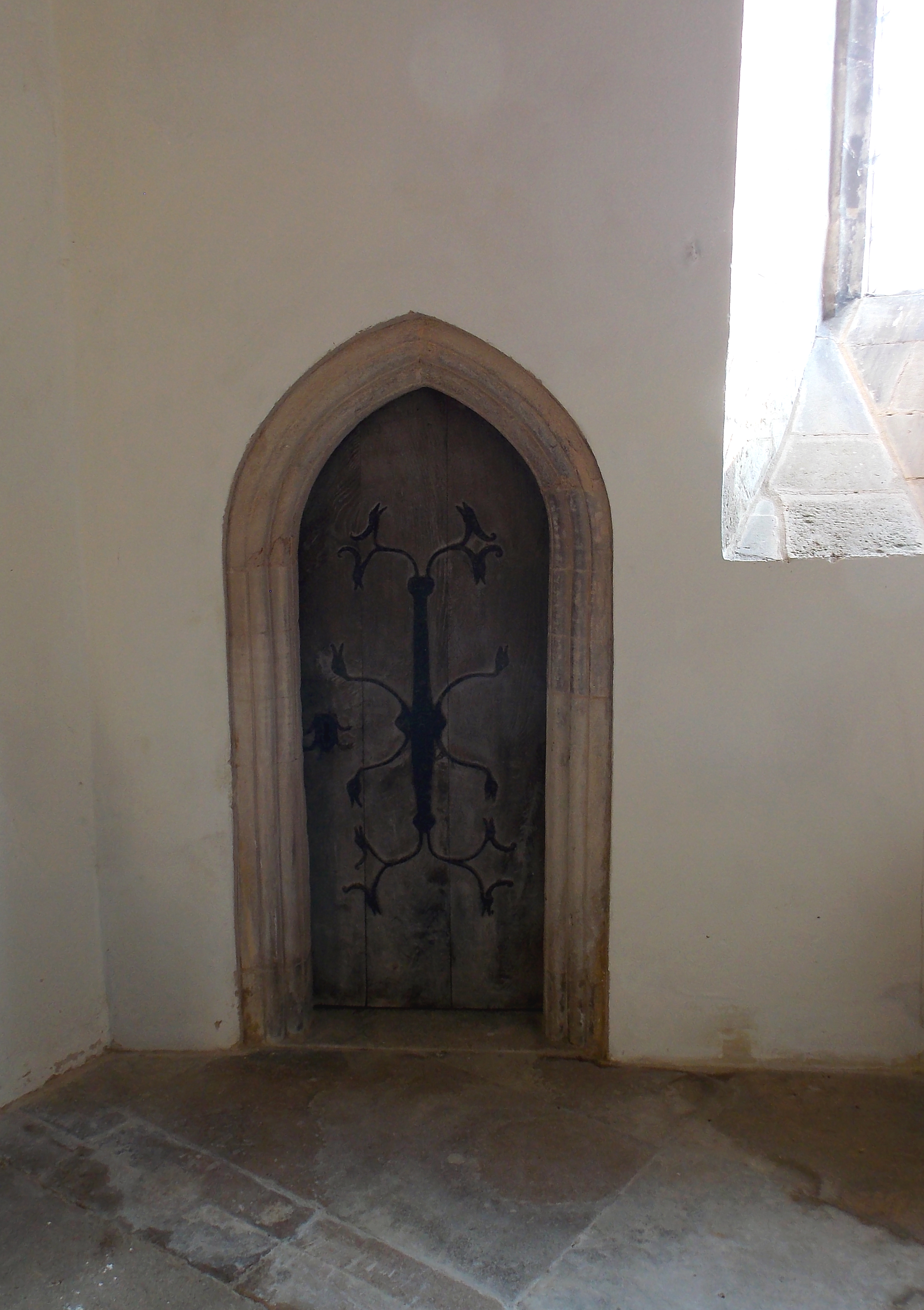
St Nicholas belfry stair door in the tower

== See also ==
- List of churches preserved by the Churches Conservation Trust in the East of England
