= Nibley House =

House of historical significance in Gloucestershire, England

Coordinates: 51°39′43″N 2°22′51″W

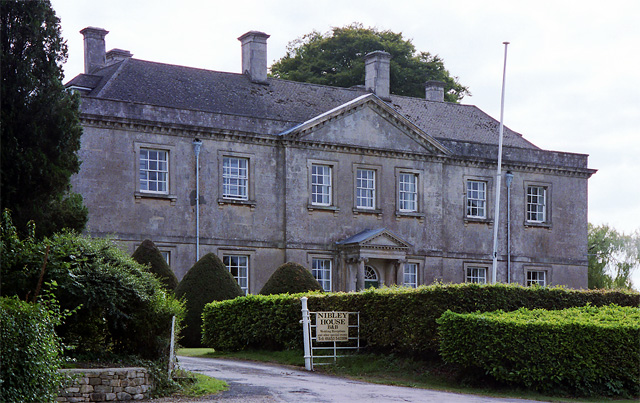
Nibley House

Nibley House, North Nibley in Gloucestershire is a Grade II* listed house on the English Heritage Register. The Neoclassical Georgian facade dates from 1763 behind which lies the Jacobean manor house built in 1609 by John Smythe the Elder, Steward at the time to Lord Berkeley. Nibley House is known as an example of exceptional Georgian design and for its stucco rococo style ceiling located in its drawing room thought to have been inspired by the work of the famous Swiss-Italian stuccoist Giuseppe Cortese. Today Nibley Hall is a private residence.

== Early residents ==
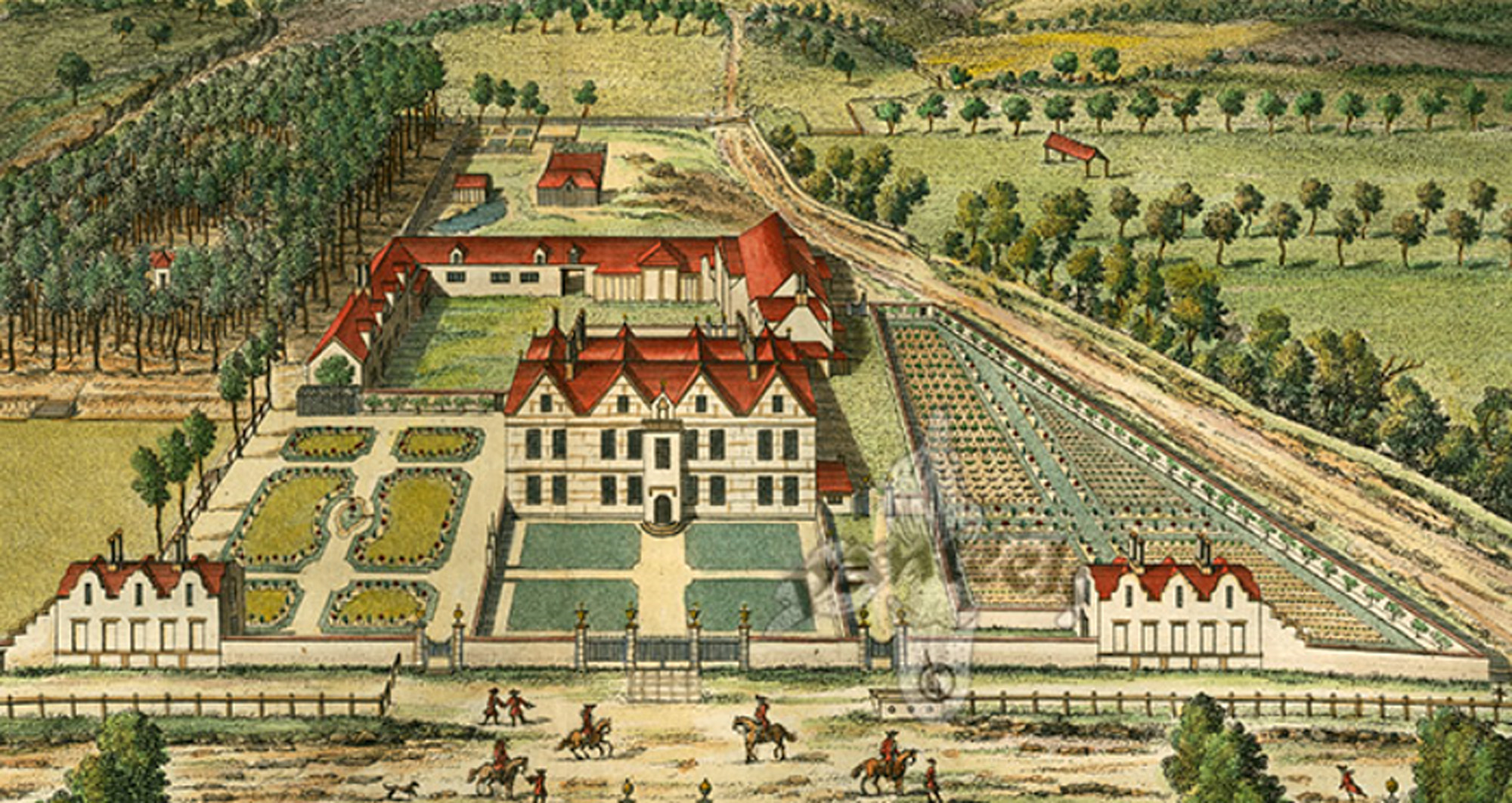
Nibley House in about 1700 before the Georgian additions were made

John Smyth (1567-1640) built the Jacobean part of Nibley House in 1609. He was the steward and biographer of, and beneficiary of patronage from, the Berkeley family of nearby Berkeley Castle. The numerous books that he wrote are highly regarded by historians and widely quoted as they accurately portray social conditions of that time. Shortly after his second marriage he built Nibley House). He acquired a large amount of property which was listed in his Will of 1640.

Nibley House was inherited by his son, also John (1611-1692). The younger John was also a writer, his most notable work being “A Description of the Hundred of Berkeley”; from about 1640 he was reluctantly caught up in the Civil War. The younger John’s eldest son, Edward, married Rose, daughter of Sir Edward Leech (MP) or Leche of Shipley Hall; John, considering them extravagant, left his estate in North Nibley to his grandson George Smyth, it being settled on him at the time of his marriage in 1691. In the early 1700s George had a coloured engraving made of his estate. His son, also George, was born shortly after his father died in 1712. In his will the senior George Smyth left all of his estates to his then-unborn child, whether son or daughter. The younger George Smyth made major alterations and additions to the Jacobean house from 1763 and transformed it into the present house. In 1735 he married Sarah, the daughter of Henry Biggs of Benthall. In 1767, their son Nicholas married Anna Maria, daughter of Sir Charles Leighton, and heiress to her grandmother’s Condover estates. Their only son, also Nicholas, inherited Nibley House on the death of his father.

== Later residents ==
The house was sold to John Jortin, a landowner and barrister of Lincoln's Inn. After the death of his only son, he left Nibley House to a distant relative, William Lee, on condition that Lee assumed the surname of Jortin.

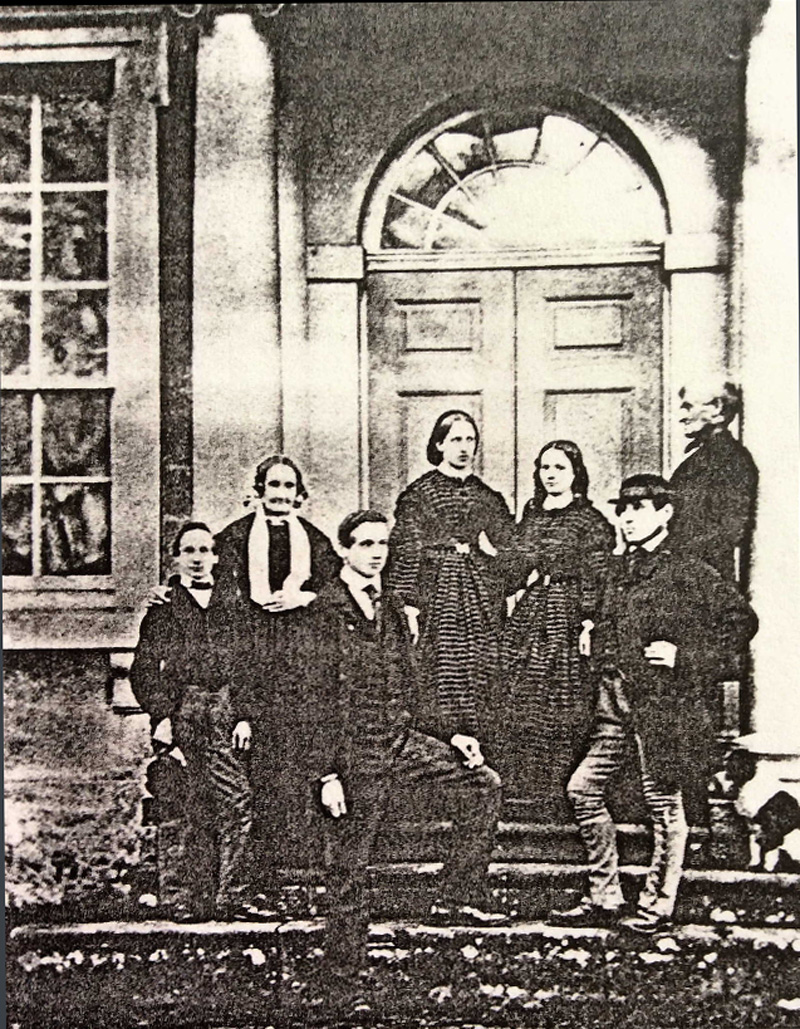
The Bennett family at Nibley House in about 1860.

William Lee Jortin sold the house in around 1848 to Isaac Bennett, who called the property "The Great House" and farmed the 200 acres surrounding the house until retiring to a cottage on the estate in 1870, being succeeded by his son, Charles, who ran the farm. On Charles's death in 1879, his widow continued to run the estate, selling it in 1901 to Colonel William Frederick Noel, of the Royal Engineers. He sold it in 1911 to Lieutenant-Colonel James Douglas Buckton, of the Prince of Wales Battalion. He died in 1933; his widow died in 1940, and the church sold Nibley House., The house had fallen into disrepair, and is currently undergoing renovations by the current owners.
