= HM Prison Noranside =

British Prison

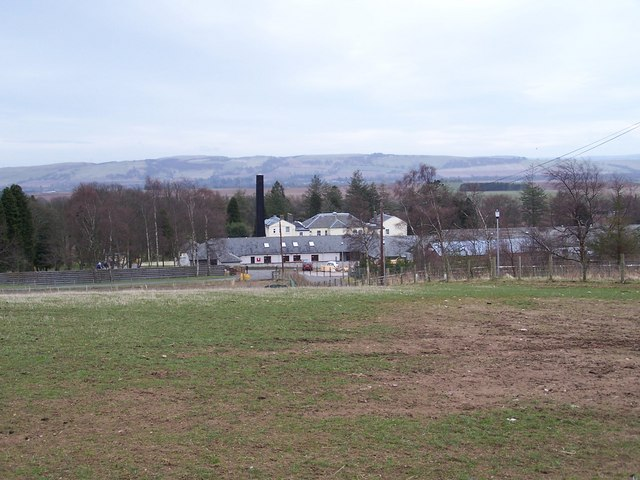
- Noranside Pictured in March 2006
- Location: Noranside, Scotland
- Status: Abandoned
- Capacity: 140
- Population: 135
- Opened: 1966
- Closed: 2011
- Managed by: Scottish Prison Service

HM Prison Noranside (24 miles or 39 kilometres north of Dundee off the A90) was a low-security prison, located in Noranside, Scotland. The prison was managed by the Scottish Prison Service. It had a design capacity of up to 140 prisoners. surprisingly a small number for the size of the prison. It was merged with HMP Castle Huntly on 30 October 2011.
