= Mosul (disambiguation) =

Mosul is a city in northern Iraq.

Mosul may also refer to:

== Places ==
=== Iraq ===
- Mosul Governorate, a governorate
- Mosul Province, Ottoman Empire, a former administrative division
- Mosul International Airport

=== Other places ===
- Mosul, Azerbaijan, a village in Azerbaijan

== Films ==
- Mosul (2019 documentary film), a film by Dan Gabriel about the battle to reclaim the Iraqi city of Mosul from the Islamic State
- Mosul (2019 action film), a war film by Matthew Michael Carnahan about Nineveh Swat Team's fight against ISIS

== Other uses ==
- University of Mosul, public university located in Mosul, Iraq
- Battle of Mosul (disambiguation), several historical battles in or near Mosul, Iraq
- Mosul FC, Iraqi football club based in Mosul, Iraq

== See also ==
- Chaldean Catholic Archeparchy of Mosul, a diocese located in the city of Mosul, Iraq
- Mosul Dam, Iraq
- Musul (disambiguation)
