= John Smith (steward of Berkeley) =

English antiquary and lawyer (1567–1640)

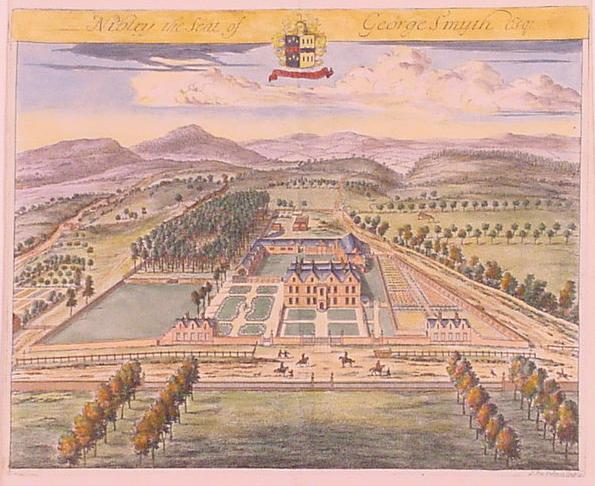
Nibley, the Seat of George Smyth, Esq., by Jan Kip, 1709

John Smith (1567–1640), of North Nibley in Gloucestershire, was an English lawyer and antiquary and was the genealogist of the Berkeley family. He served as a Member of Parliament for Midhurst in Sussex from 1621 to 1622.

== Early life ==
Smith was the son of Thomas Smith of Hoby, Leicestershire and his wife Joan Alan, daughter of Richard Alan, citizen of Derby. He was educated at the free school, Derby and then went in 1584 to Callowden to wait on Thomas Berkeley (d. 1611), son and heir apparent of Henry Berkeley, 7th Baron Berkeley (1534–1613), of Berkeley Castle in Gloucestershire. He studied under the same tutor, and he went up with the young nobleman to Magdalen College, Oxford, in 1589.

== Career ==
In 1594 he was admitted to the Middle Temple, and two years later, having completed his law studies there, returned to Berkeley Castle in Gloucestershire as household steward to Henry Berkeley, 7th Baron Berkeley (1534–1613). In 1597 he was awarded by that family the more lucrative and important office of steward of the hundred and liberty of Berkeley. About the same time he took up his residence at North Nibley, Gloucestershire, near Berkeley Castle, where in time he acquired two adjacent manor-houses, "adorned with gardens and groves and a large park well wooded." The Berkeleys were so generous to him that the family's court jester is said on one occasion to have tied Berkeley Castle to the church with twine "to prevent the former from going to Nibley." As steward of the manor, Smith had charge of the muniments room at the castle, and devoted himself to studying the valuable deeds and papers which had accumulated there over the centuries. He eventually wrote in three volumes The Lives of the Berkeleys, Lords of the Honour, Castle and Manor of Berkeley from 1066 to 1618, a history of the lives of the first twenty-one lords of Berkeley, from the Norman conquest down to 1628 and assigned to each one an epithet suiting their career.

In 1621, Smith was elected Member of Parliament for Midhurst in Sussex, but took little part in the increasingly contentious politics of the time.

== Marriages and progeny ==
Smith married firstly Grace, a native of Nibley, who died in 1609, without issue. Secondly on 9 January 1610 he married Mary Browning, daughter of John Browning of Cowley, by whom he had five sons and three daughters (for descendants see Nibley House, North Nibley). He is believed to be the great grandfather of the poet John Smith.

== Death ==
Smith died at Nibley in the autumn of 1640.

== Works ==
Smith wrote at least 20 books, which in 1639 having just finished his last major work, the History of the Hundred of Berkeley, he called "the recreations of my last 50 years". His works included:

- Smyth, John. The Lives of the Berkeleys, Lords of the Honour, Castle and Manor of Berkeley from 1066 to 1618, ed. Maclean, Sir John, 3 vols., Gloucester, 1883–1885 (First published c.1628)
  - Vol 1, 1883
  - Vol 2, 1883
  - Vol.3, History of the Hundred of Berkeley, 1885

Parliament of England
Preceded by Thomas Bowyer; William Courteman	Member of Parliament for Midhurst; 1621; With: Richard Lewknor	Succeeded by Sir Anthony Manie; Richard Lewknor
