= Musul =

Musul may stand for:

- The city of Mosul, Iraq
- An alternate name for Wushu, a Chinese martial art
- Korean martial arts
- Musul (territory), a Postclassic Maya polity

== See also ==
- Mosul (disambiguation)
