= Nibley Music Festival =

- Location(s): North Nibley, Gloucestershire, England
- Years active: 2007–2024
- Website: https://nibleyfestival.co.uk/

Nibley Music Festival was an annual two day music festival that took place in July in the village of North Nibley, Gloucestershire, UK, from 2007 to 2024. The Festival was held on a family farm near St. Martin's Church.

The Festival, formerly called North Nibley Music Festival, was first held in 2007 as a way of fundraising for local good causes and charities. The management and organisation of the festival was carried out by small team of volunteers working throughout the year, and about 150 extra volunteers around festival time. Since 2007 it had grown in size to a capacity of c. 4,500 people and at the time of its permanent closure, raised about £30-40k each year through a combination of ticket sales, sponsorship and encouraging local charitable groups to set up stalls on the festival site.

It showcased popular music across a wide variety of genres and the festival was aimed primarily at a family audience. In 2013, the festival sold all of its tickets in less than an hour.

Bands that have played at Nibley in the past include The Wonderstuff, King Charles, Feeder, Jesus Jones, The Heavy, Scouting For Girls The Beat, Dodgy, The Christians and The Selecter.

In 2024, organisers announced that the 2024 festival would be the last, with rising costs as the main reason. Up to this point, the festival had raised nearly £400,000 for the local community.

In January 2025, organisers posted on their official Facebook page that they were exploring a potential 2026 festival.
