= Noblethorpe =

Hamlet in South Yorkshire, England

Coordinates: 53.54266°N 1.56838°W

Noblethorpe is a hamlet in the English county of South Yorkshire. The hamlet falls within the Penistone East Ward of the Barnsley MBC.

Noblethorpe lies on the A628 road between Barnsley and Penistone, to its north is the village of Silkstone and to its south is Silkstone Common. An 1822 description describes Noblethorpe as having a single house.
