= Northfleet Green =

Hamlet in Kent, England

Coordinates: 51.416°N 0.3373°E

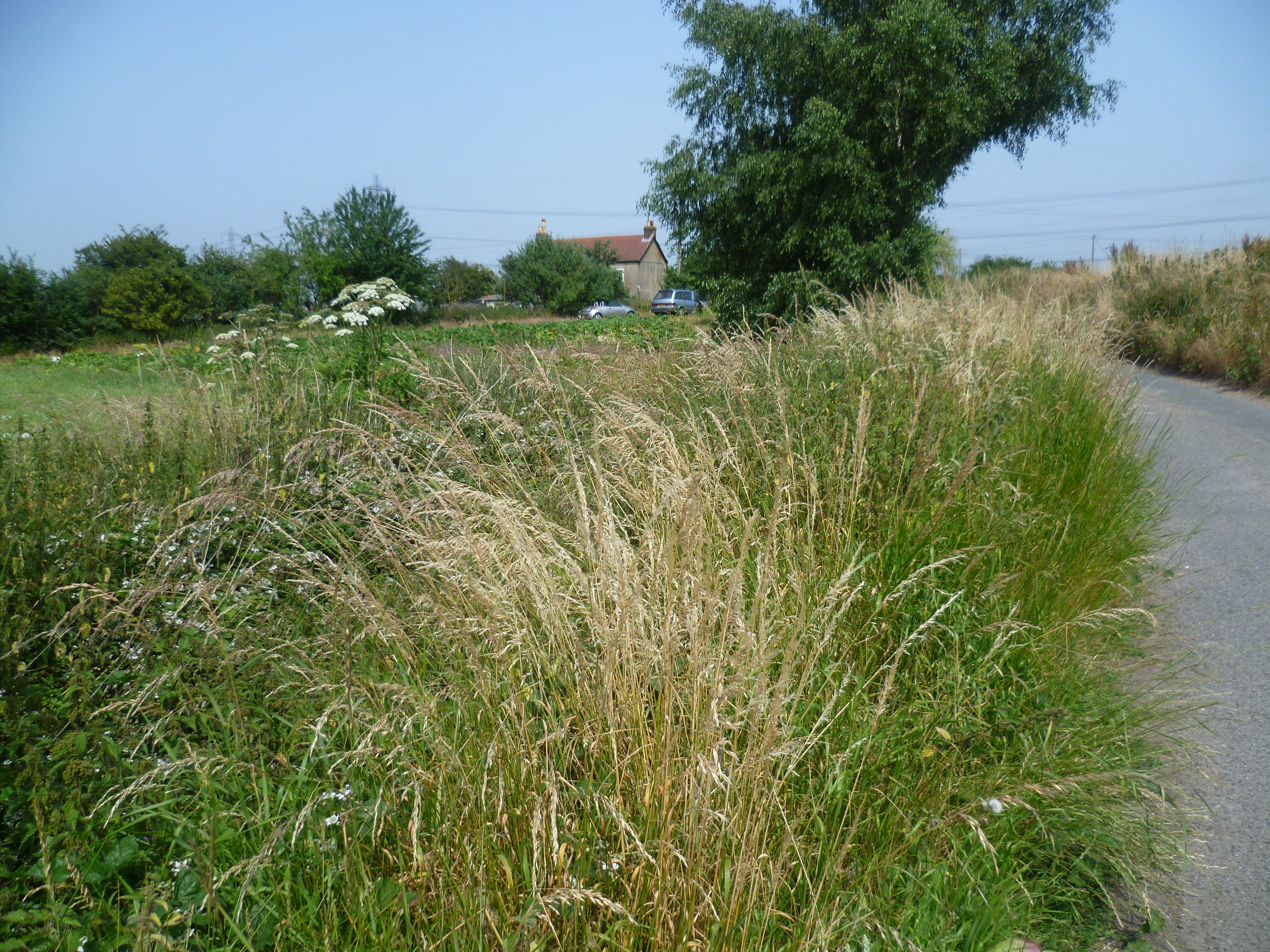
- Northfleet Green Road

- Location within Kent
- District: Gravesham
- Shire county: Kent
- Region: South East
- Country: England
- Sovereign state: United Kingdom
- Post town: GRAVESEND
- Postcode district: DA13
- Dialling code: 01474
- Police: Kent
- Fire: Kent
- Ambulance: South East Coast
- UK Parliament: Gravesham

Northfleet Green is a hamlet in the borough of Gravesham in Kent, England. It is located around two miles southwest of Gravesend and just east of Southfleet in the neighbouring borough of Dartford. The High Speed 1 railway line passes just to the north of the hamlet. The population of the hamlet is included in the ward of Istead Rise.
