= Battle of Mosul =

Battle of Mosul may refer to:

- Battle of Mosul (1107), a battle in which Kilij Arslan I of the Rum Seljuks conquered Mosul
- Siege of Mosul (1261), a battle fought between the Mamluk Sultanate and the Ilkhanate
- Siege of Mosul (1517), part of the Ottoman–Persian Wars
- Siege of Mosul (1743), an offensive in which the Persians besieged the Ottomans
- Battle of Mosul (1745), a battle between Persian and Ottoman forces, following the 1743 Siege of Mosul
- Battle of Mosul (1917), a series of small battles between Russians and Turks ended mostly indecisively
- Battle of Mosul (2004), a battle fought during the Iraq War
- Battle of Mosul (2008), part of the 2008 Nineveh campaign of the Iraq War
- Fall of Mosul, a battle in June 2014 during which ISIL seized control of the city
- Mosul offensive (2015), an offensive to retake the northern outskirts of the city from ISIL in 2015
- Battle of Mosul (2016–17), the retaking of Mosul from ISIS control on 20 July 2017, and the subsequent efforts to purge the remaining militants and reconstruct the city
- 2017 Western Nineveh offensive, an offensive that began on 25 April 2017 and ended on 9 June 2017, to expel the forces of the Islamic State near the Syrian border

== See also ==
- Mosul (disambiguation)
- Battle of Nineveh (disambiguation)
