= Noranside =

Hamlet in Angus, Scotland

Coordinates: 56°44′00″N 02°52′0″W

Noranside is a hamlet in Angus, Scotland, located at 56° 44' 0" North, 2° 52' 0" West.

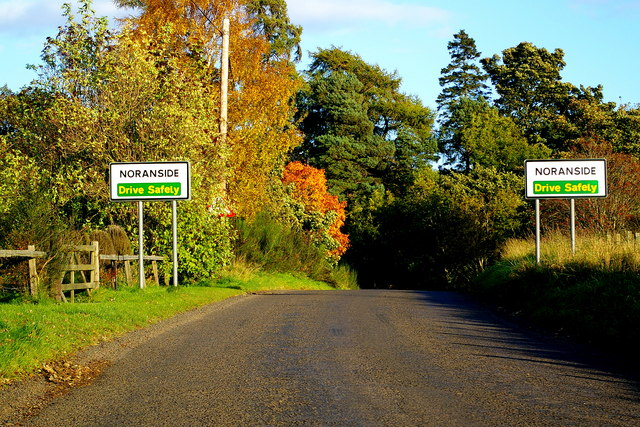
Entering Noranside in October 2008

The prison HMP Noranside was operated there from 1966 to 2011.
