= North Close =

Village in County Durham, England

Coordinates: 54.683°N 1.597°W

North Close is a village in County Durham, England, between Spennymoor and Kirk Merrington to the south of Durham.
