= Morris Township, Greene County, Pennsylvania =

Township in Pennsylvania, US

Coordinates: 39°58′22″N 80°18′17″W

- Township
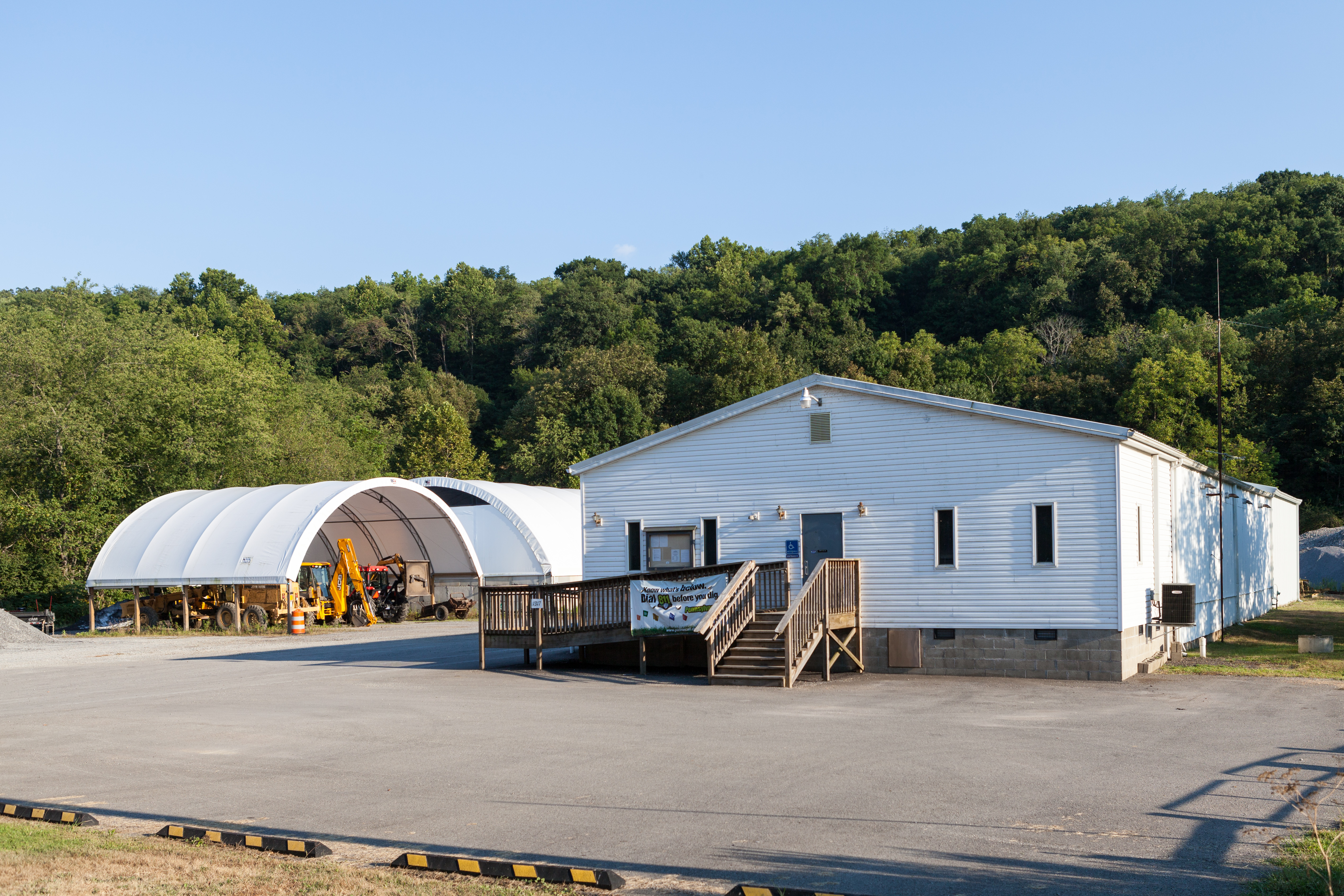
- Municipal Building

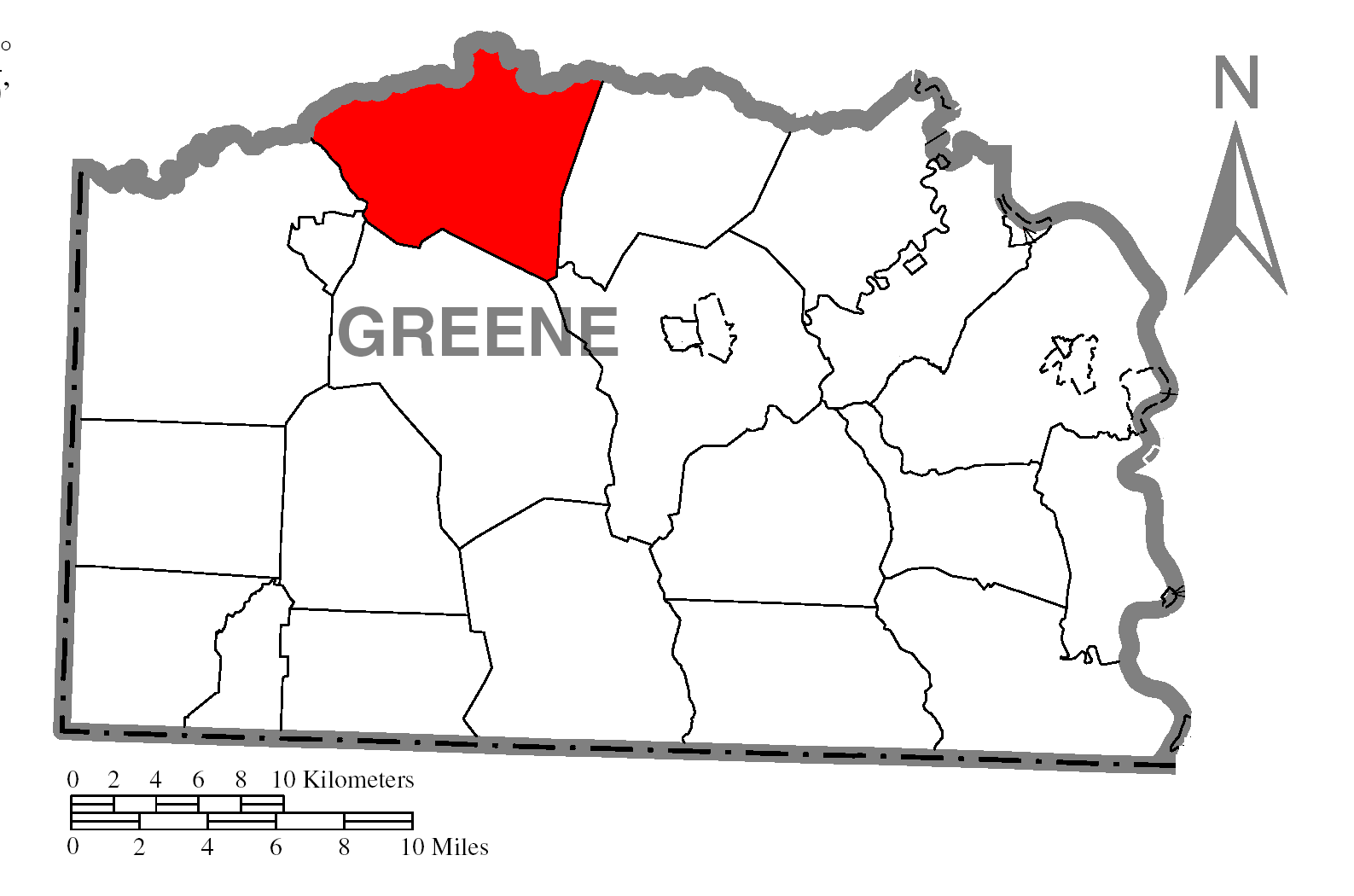
- Location of Morris Township in Greene County

- Location of Greene County in Pennsylvania
- Country: United States
- State: Pennsylvania
- County: Greene

Area
  - Total: 35.71 sq mi (92.48 km^{2})
  - Land: 35.69 sq mi (92.43 km^{2})
  - Water: 0.019 sq mi (0.05 km^{2})

Population (2020)
  - Total: 564 ▼
  - Estimate (2023): 535
  - Density: 22.5/sq mi (8.69/km^{2})
- Time zone: UTC-4 (EST)
  - Summer (DST): UTC-5 (EDT)
- Area code: 724
- FIPS code: 42-059-51064
- Website: http://morristwpgreenecopa.com/

Morris Township is a township that is located in Greene County, Pennsylvania, United States. The population was 564 at the time of the 2020 census, a decline from the total of 818 that was tabulated during the 2010 census.

== Geography ==
The township is in north-central Greene County and is bordered to the north by Washington County. Unincorporated communities in the township include West Union, Deer Lick, Time, Nineveh, and Swarts. According to the United States Census Bureau, the township has a total area of 35.7 square miles (92.5 km^{2}), of which 0.02 square miles (0.05 km^{2}), or 0.05%, are water.

== Demographics ==
Historical population
Census	Pop.	Note	%±
2000	1,040		—
2010	818		−21.3%
2020	564		−31.1%
2025 (est.)	525		−6.9%
U.S. Decennial Census

As of the census of 2000, there were 1,040 people, 338 households, and 259 families residing in the township. The population density was 29.0 inhabitants per square mile (11.2/km^{2}). There were 375 housing units at an average density of 10.5/sq mi (4.0/km^{2}). The racial makeup of the township was 98.65% White, 1.15% African American, 0.10% Native American, and 0.10% from two or more races. Hispanic or Latino of any race were 0.29% of the population.

There were 338 households, out of which 37.9% had children under the age of 18 living with them, 64.5% were married couples living together, 8.6% had a female householder with no husband present, and 23.1% were non-families. 21.0% of all households were made up of individuals, and 6.5% had someone living alone who was 65 years of age or older. The average household size was 2.75 and the average family size was 3.18.

In the township the population was spread out, with 23.9% under the age of 18, 9.5% from 18 to 24, 31.5% from 25 to 44, 24.4% from 45 to 64, and 10.6% who were 65 years of age or older. The median age was 38 years. For every 100 females there were 114.4 males. For every 100 females age 18 and over, there were 128.0 males.

The median income for a household in the township was $37,250, and the median income for a family was $43,750. Males had a median income of $30,288 versus $20,809 for females. The per capita income for the township was $15,430. About 9.8% of families and 14.3% of the population were below the poverty line, including 22.3% of those under age 18 and 14.5% of those age 65 or over.
