= Nineveh, Pennsylvania =

Unincorporated community in Pennsylvania, US

- Unincorporated community
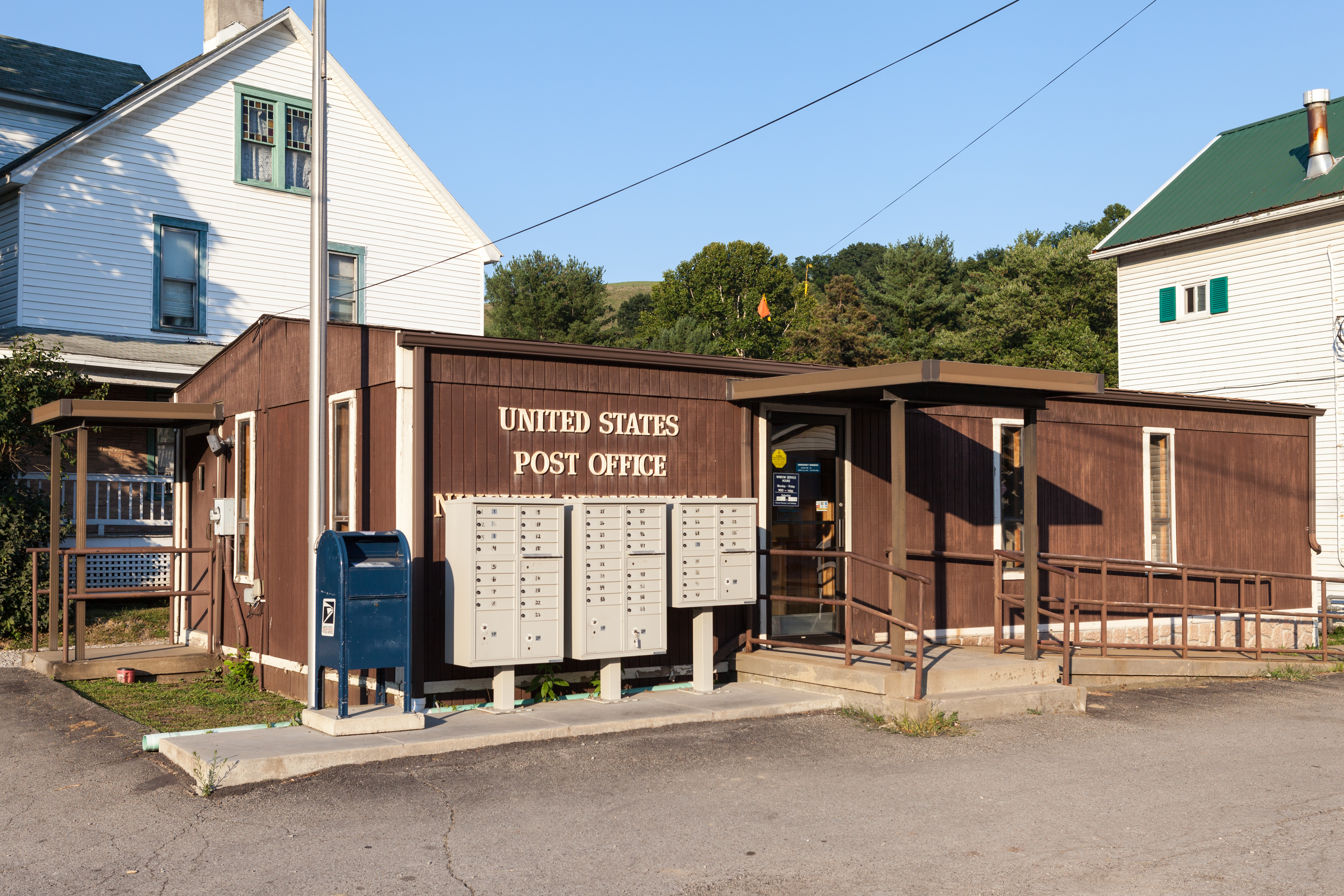
- Nineveh Post Office

- Location within Pennsylvania Location within the United States
- Coordinates: 39°57′41″N 80°18′28″W
- Country: United States
- State: Pennsylvania
- County: Greene
- Township: Morris
- Elevation: 1,020 ft (310 m)
- Time zone: UTC-5 (Eastern (EST))
  - Summer (DST): UTC-4 (EDT)
- ZIP code: 15353
- Area code: 724
- GNIS feature ID: 1182471

Nineveh is an unincorporated communityin Greene County, in the U.S. state of Pennsylvania.

== History ==
A post office called Nineveh has been in operation in Morris Township since 1871. The community was named after the ancient city of Nineveh.
