= Battle of Nineveh =

Battle of Nineveh may refer to:

- Battle of Nineveh (612 BC), the fall of Assyria
- Battle of Nineveh (627), the climactic battle of the Byzantine-Sassanid War of 602–628

== See also ==
- Western Nineveh offensive (2017), during the Iraqi Civil War
- Nineveh (disambiguation)
- Battle of Mosul (disambiguation)
