= North Bitchburn =

Coordinates: 54.689°N 1.733°W

- Location within County Durham
- OS grid reference: NZ172327
- Unitary authority: County Durham
- Ceremonial county: County Durham
- Region: North East
- Country: England
- Sovereign state: United Kingdom
- Post town: Crook
- Postcode district: DL15
- Police: Durham
- Fire: County Durham and Darlington
- Ambulance: North East
- UK Parliament: North West Durham

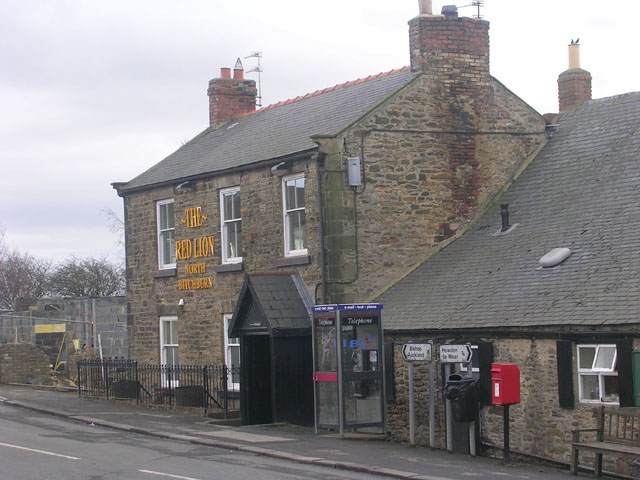
The Red Lion in North Bitchburn

North Bitchburn is a small village in County Durham, England. It is situated 3 miles (4.8 km) north west of Bishop Auckland, near Howden-le-Wear. In the 2001 census North Bitchburn had a population of 135.

The village has a row of terrace houses named Low Row consisting of 20 houses. There are also estates called Wellgarth Court, North Bitchburn Terrace and Hillside Court. There is one public house, a Methodist chapel and one shop within the village centre. The public house is named 'The Red Lion'.
