= Normanton-on-Cliffe =

Village in the South Kesteven district of Lincolnshire, England

Coordinates: 53.005210°N 0.58693°W

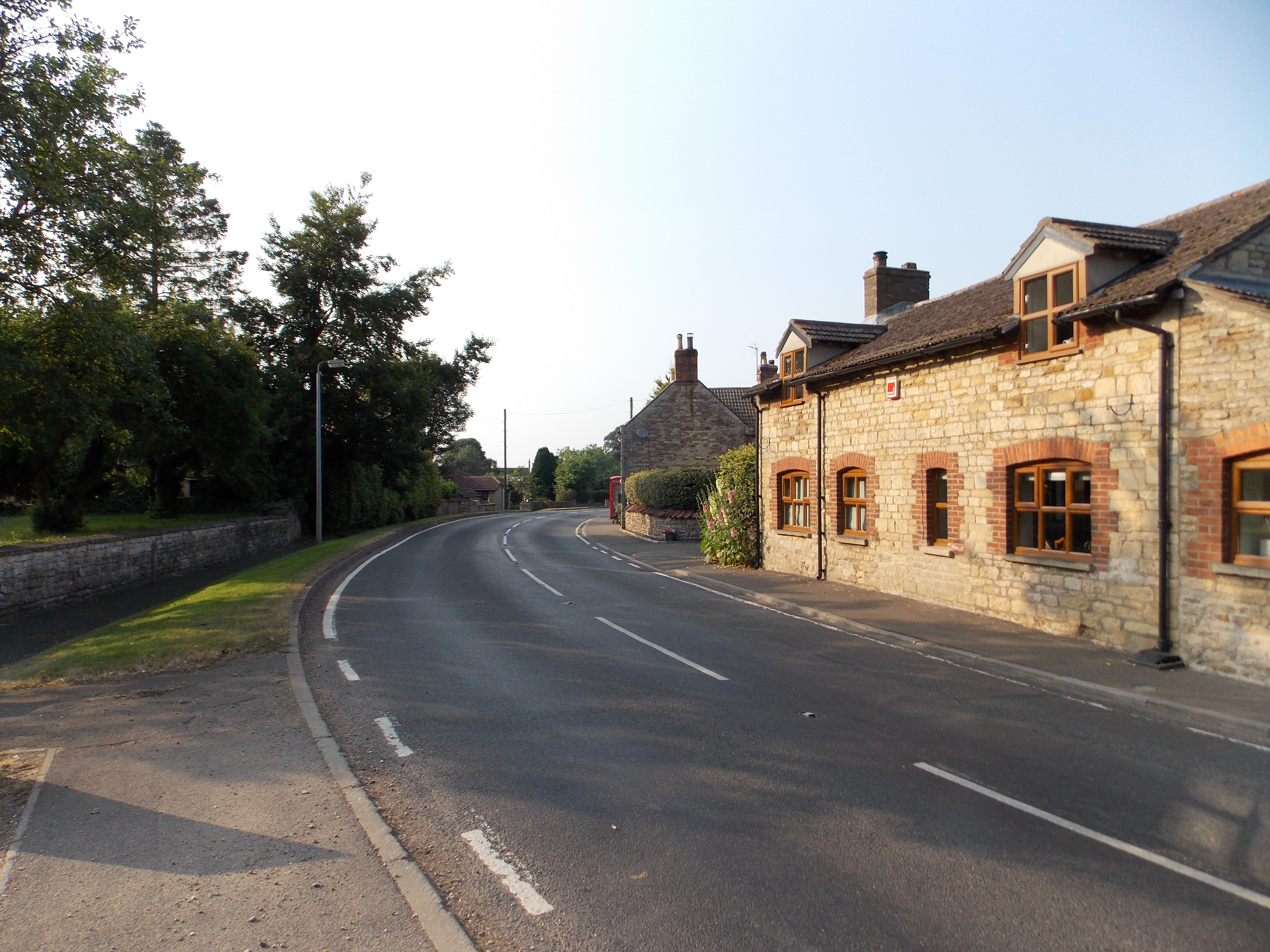
- Normanton village looking north

- Location within Lincolnshire
- OS grid reference: SK949463
  - London: 105 mi (169 km) S
- Civil parish: Normanton
- District: South Kesteven
- Shire county: Lincolnshire
- Region: East Midlands
- Country: England
- Sovereign state: United Kingdom
- Post town: Grantham
- Postcode district: NG32
- Police: Lincolnshire
- Fire: Lincolnshire
- Ambulance: East Midlands
- UK Parliament: Grantham and Bourne

Normanton-on-Cliffe, sometimes known as Normanton, is a village and civil parish in the South Kesteven district of Lincolnshire, England. It lies on the A607 road, about 7 miles (11 km) north of the town of Grantham and 18 miles (29 km) south of Lincoln.

== Historic edifices ==
The now redundant parish church dates from the 11th century and is dedicated to Saint Nicholas of Myra. It is a Grade II* listed building in the care of the Churches Conservation Trust.

The village has an early 19th-century milestone and village pump, which is Grade II listed as a scheduled monument, standing next to the main Grantham to Lincoln road. The inscription on the milestone reads: "From Lincoln 18 miles, from Grantham 7 miles, from London 117 miles".

== See also ==
- St Nicholas' Church, Normanton
