= Tyndale Monument =

Monument in North Nibley, United Kingdom

Coordinates: 51°39′31.9″N 2°22′21.4″W

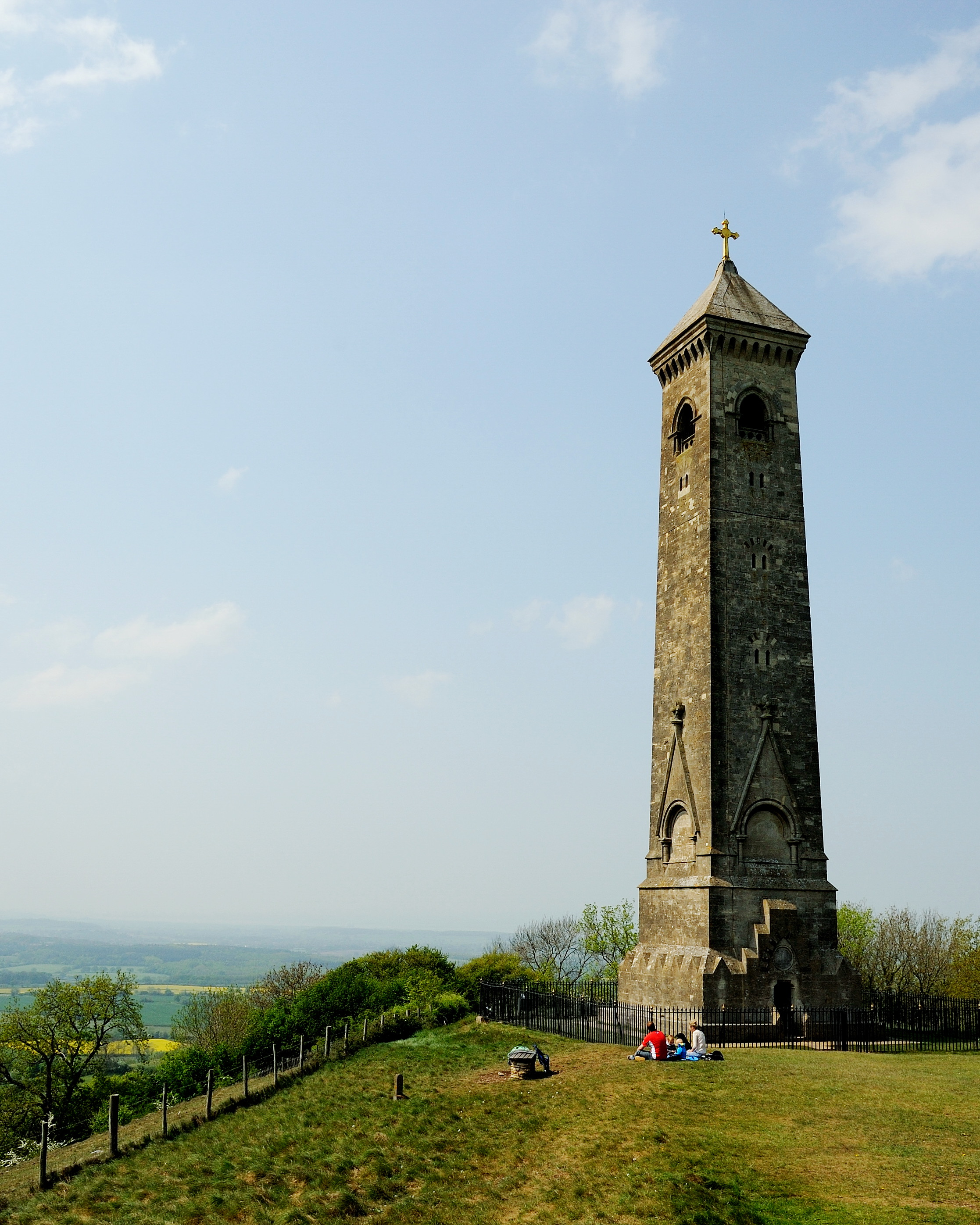
- Location: Nibley Knoll
- Designer: Samuel Sanders Teulon
- Type: cenotaph
- Material: stone
- Width: 26 feet 6 inches (8 m) at the base
- Height: 111 feet (34 m)
- Completion date: 1866
- Opening date: 6 November 1866
- Dedicated to: William Tyndale

The Tyndale Monument is a tower built on a hill at North Nibley, Gloucestershire, England. It was built in honour of William Tyndale, an early translator of the New Testament into English, who was born nearby. It is a Grade II* listed building.

The tower was constructed in 1866 and is 111 ft (34 m) tall. It is possible to enter and climb up a spiral staircase composed of 121 steps to the top of the tower. The hill it is on allows a wide range of views, especially looking down to the River Severn. A nearby topograph points to some other landmarks visible. The hill on which the monument stands is quite steep. The path follows a rough fairly steep bridleway which is part of the Cotswold Way. The tower itself is surrounded by fencing and has floodlights that light up the tower at night. The stairway has automatic lighting. The Cotswold Way long-distance footpath passes the foot of the monument, and then descends the hill into North Nibley.

The door to the tower is open most of the time for free access to a staircase which takes you to the top. Locally, it is commonly called Nibley Monument rather than its official name. The hill is called Nibley Knoll or Nibley Knob.

There is a commemorative plaque on the front of the tower. The text engraved on it reads:

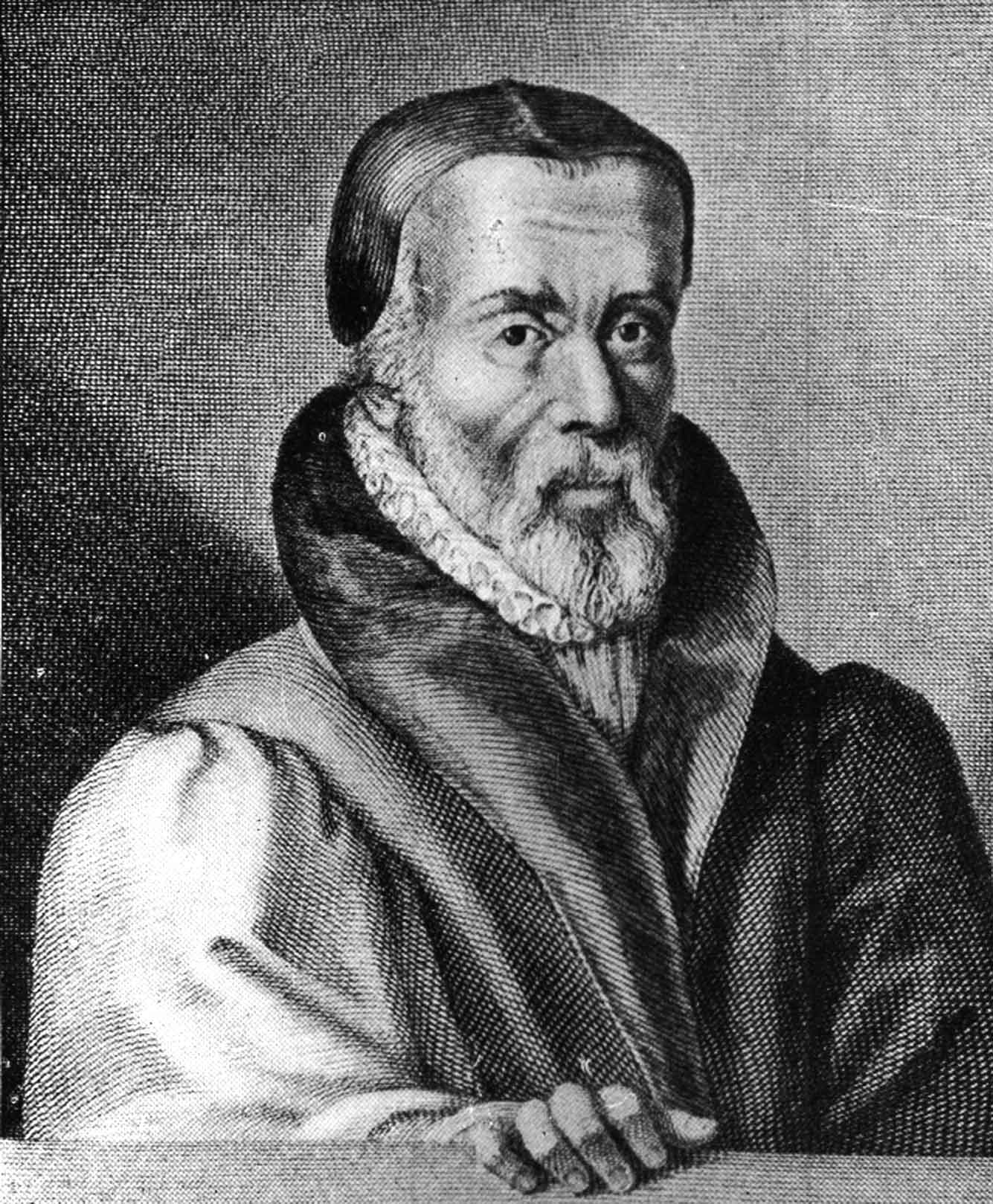
William Tyndale.

ERECTED A.D. 1866
IN GRATEFUL REMEMBRANCE OF
WILLIAM TYNDALE
TRANSLATOR OF THE ENGLISH BIBLE
WHO FIRST CAUSED THE NEW TESTAMENT
TO BE PRINTED IN THE MOTHER TONGUE
OF HIS COUNTRYMEN
BORN NEAR THIS SPOT HE SUFFERED
MARTYRDOM AT VILVORDEN IN
FLANDERS ON OCT 6 1536

The monument is a landmark that can be seen even in places as far as Bristol, which is over 20 miles away. In the town of Thornbury there is a street called Tyndale View where the tower can be seen from approximately 10 miles away.

Further down the Cotswold Edge, at Hawkesbury, is the Somerset Monument, erected in 1846, and the design of the Tyndale tower has features in common with this.

In October 2019 protesters from Extinction Rebellion used the monument to display a protest banner.
