= Ninnes, Cornwall =

Hamlet in Cornwall, England

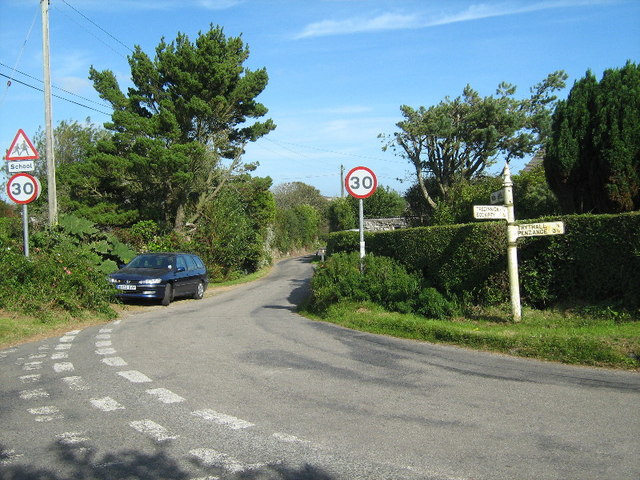
Road junction at Lower Ninnes

Higher Ninnes and Lower Ninnes are hamlets, south of Mulfra Hill in the civil parish of Madron in west Cornwall, England, UK.

== Toponymy ==
Recorded as Insula (in 1314), Enes (1327'), Enys (1403), Nenis (1623). An enys is isolated land or an island. Wartha (higher) was recorded in 1403.

== History ==
Higher Ninnes was sold by auction in 1880 by Elizabeth Nicholls. The property consisted of a dwelling house with necessary outbuildings and approximately 18 acres (7.3 ha) of arable and pasture land, with extensive commonable rights.
