= North Nibley =

Coordinates: 51.661°N 2.376°W

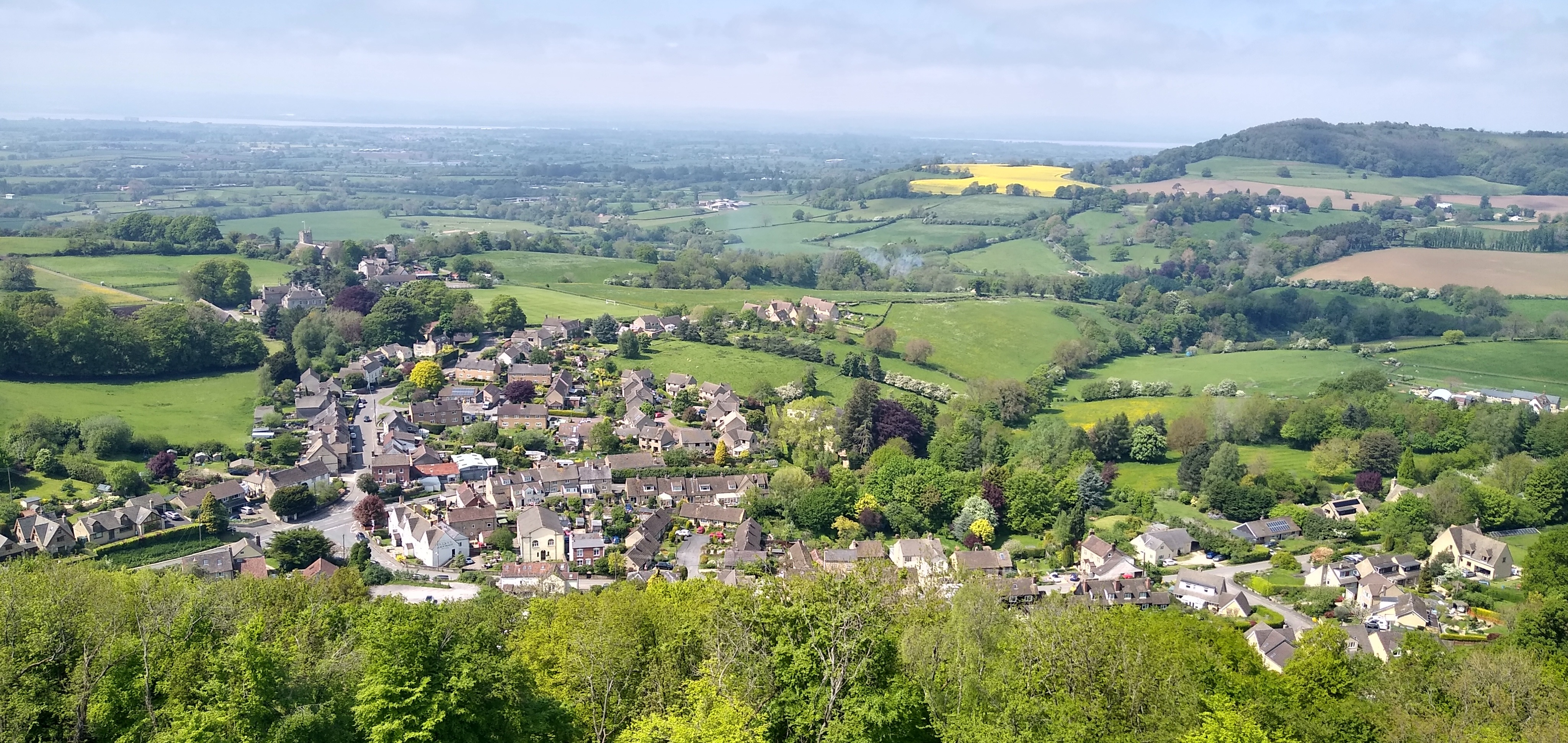
- North Nibley

- Location within Gloucestershire
- Population: 883 (2011)
- OS grid reference: ST740958
- District: Stroud
- Shire county: Gloucestershire
- Region: South West
- Country: England
- Sovereign state: United Kingdom
- Post town: DURSLEY
- Postcode district: GL11
- Dialling code: 01453
- Police: Gloucestershire
- Fire: Gloucestershire
- Ambulance: South Western
- UK Parliament: Stroud
- Website: North Nibley Parish Council

North Nibley is a village in Gloucestershire, England about 1.9 miles (3 km) northwest of Wotton-under-Edge.

== Name ==
The village is commonly known as Nibley, but the official name distinguishes it from the village of Nibley, just outside Yate, about 10 miles (16 km) away in South Gloucestershire. Nibley Green is an associated hamlet to its northwest at grid reference ST732965.

== History ==
The Battle of Nibley Green, fought on 20 March 1469/1470, is notable as the last battle fought in England entirely between the private armies of feudal magnates.

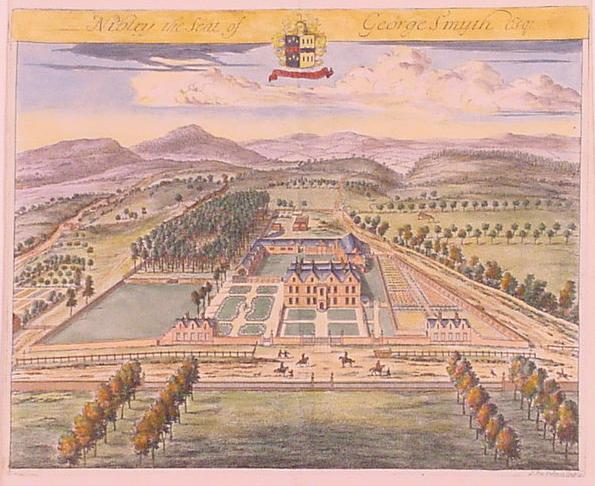
Nibley, the Seat of George Smyth, Esq., by Jan Kip, 1709

The Tyndale Monument was built in honour of William Tyndale, who was born nearby, possibly at Melksham Court, Stinchcombe. Tyndale was responsible for translating the New Testament into English, for which he was sentenced to death and burned at the stake in Vilvoorde, Flanders.

Nibley House, next to the church, was the home of John Smyth (1567–1641), steward of Berkeley Castle and the estates of the Berkeley family, author of Lives of the Berkeleys and historian of the early settlement of Virginia.

== Geography ==
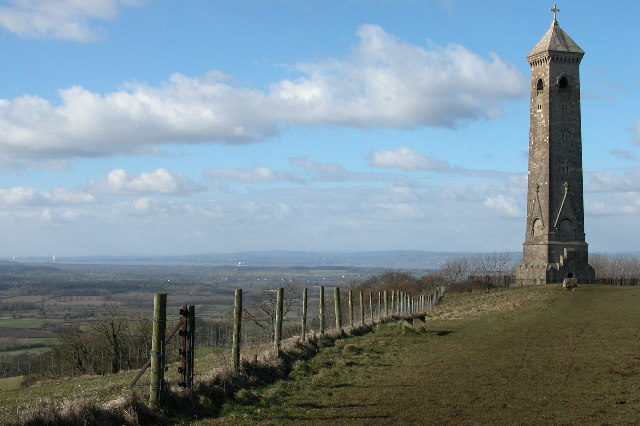
The Tyndale Monument, built in 1866

Nearby Stinchcombe Hill has become popular with walkers and horse riders, and is crossed by the Cotswold Way. The Tyndale Monument stands on Nibley Knoll just above the village, at grid reference ST742957 on the Cotswold Way. From 1992, volunteers have cleared the area to recreate the previously open panoramic views of both the Severn Bridges and beyond to the Black Mountains in Wales.

== Present ==
The village shop on Barrs Lane has been run as a voluntary organisation by villagers since 2001. Since 2007 the villagers have organised the annual Nibley Music Festival. The village is home to the Nibley Cobras football team and Nibley cricket team, who have won the Pratt Cup two consecutive seasons. North Nibley Cobras reformed in 2014. Starting in Stroud Division 7, they have gone on to win two league titles and three Cup titles, including a historic treble 2018–19, and are in Division 3 for the 2020–21 season. They set a Stroud League record by not conceding a goal en route to winning the Dennis Mason Trophy 2018–19.

In 2014 the final episode of the third series of BBC One's Sherlock featured the futuristic Swinhay House, home of Renishaw plc founder Sir David McMurtry, designed by eco-architect David Austin.

== See also ==
- Battle of Nibley Green
