= Ninnes Bridge =

Coordinates: 50.1706°N 5.4813°W

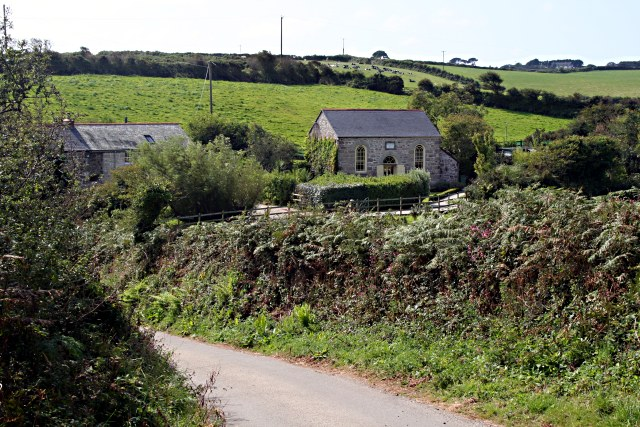
- A converted chapel at Ninnes Bridge

- Location within Cornwall
- OS grid reference: SW515358
- Unitary authority: Cornwall
- Ceremonial county: Cornwall
- Region: South West
- Country: England
- Sovereign state: United Kingdom

Ninnes Bridge is a hamlet in west Cornwall, England. Ninnes Bridge is northwest of Canon's Town and near Trencrom Hill.

Before it was called Ninnes Bridge it went by the name of Gonew. In 1872 land was bought for a chapel. The trustees were John Quick, Wm. Quick, John Hollow, Thos. Eddy and Jas. Inch (farmers), John Curnow, Hy. James, Thos. Martin, and Wm. Bennetts (miners), Chas. Burt (tailor), Edw. Richards (grocer of St. Ives), Rich. Paynter Stevens, Math. Woolcock, Thos. Hy. Bryant (fishermen of St.Ives). This attractive little chapel was built for about £150 and was opened in 1873.
