= Nineveh, England =

Hamlets in the United Kingdom

There have been at least three places called Nineveh in England.

Two are hamlets in the northern part of the county of Worcestershire. The northernmost one is at grid reference SO685735 in the parish of Bayton, less than a mile from the border with Shropshire. The other is at SO623648 in Kyre, on the road between Tenbury Wells and Bromyard.

There was once a Nineveh at SP047890, anciently in Handsworth in the county of Staffordshire; it has now been subsumed into Birmingham.
