= Nineveh Township, Lincoln County, Missouri =

Township in Lincoln County, Missouri, U.S.

Coordinates: 39.09°N 91.25°W

Nineveh Township is an inactive township in Lincoln County, in the U.S. state of Missouri.

Nineveh Township was established in 1872.
