= Frome Vale =

Electoral ward in Bristol, England

Coordinates: 51.49°N 2.53°W

- ward Bristol City Council
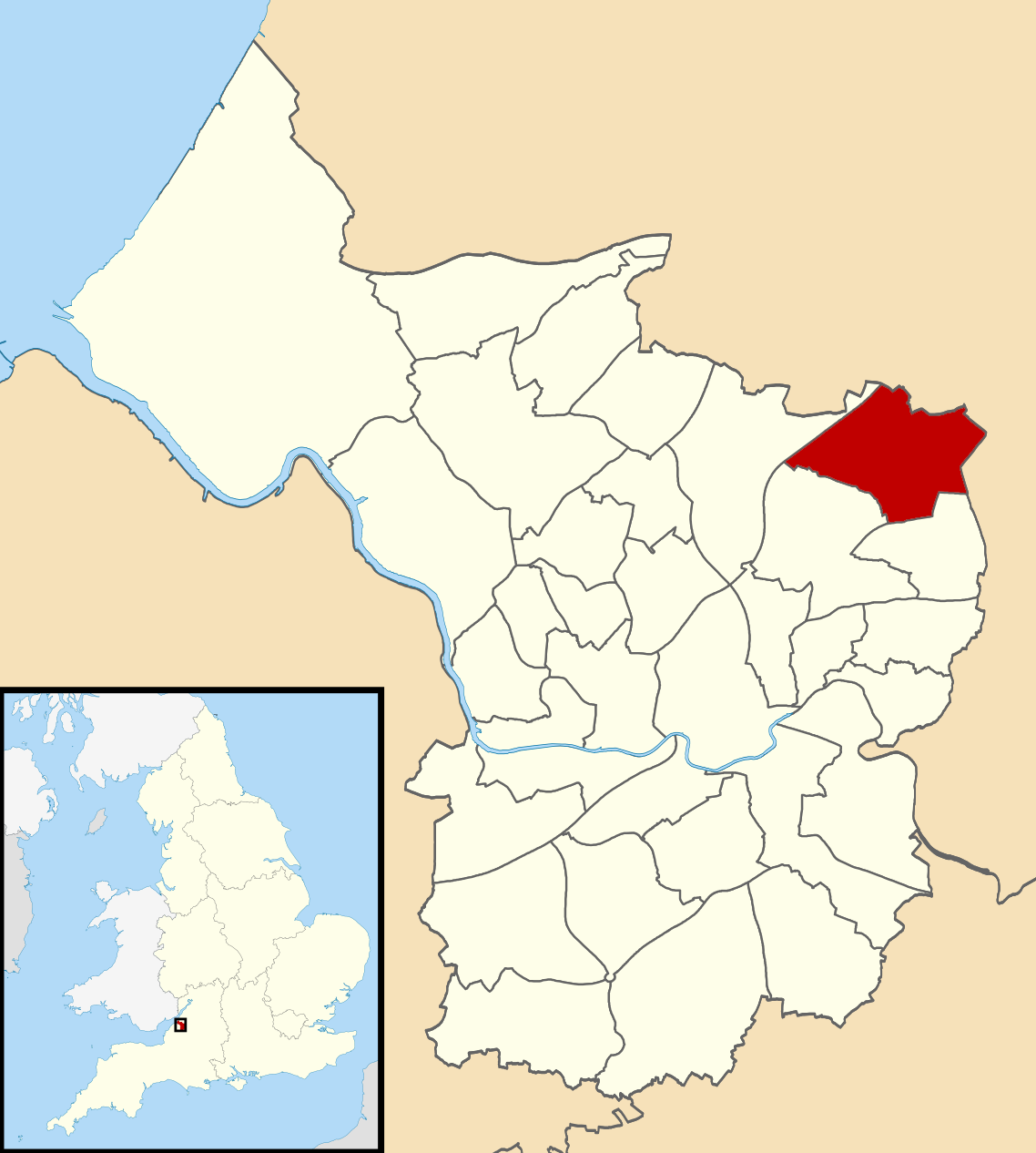
- Ward boundaries since 2016.
- County: Bristol
- Population: 14,057
- Electorate: 9,958

Current ward
- Councillor: Louis Martin (Labour)
- Councillor: Al Al-Maghrabi (Green)
- UK Parliament constituency: Bristol North East

Frome Vale is an electoral ward in Bristol, England, lying northeast of the city centre. It is represented by two members on Bristol City Council which, following the 2024 local elections, are Louis Martin of the Labour Party and Al Al-Maghrabi of the Green Party, following the latter's defection from the Labour Party to the Green Party in October 2025.

== Area profile ==
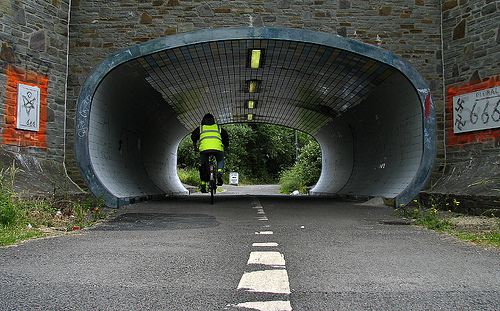
The Bristol and Bath cycle path passes under Station Road, Fishponds, Bristol

Frome Vale includes the suburbs of Broomhill, Begbrook and Fishponds, and also the Glenside campus of the University of the West of England. The ward is named after the River Frome, which runs through the area in a wooded valley through the parks of Oldbury Court and Snuff Mills.

Frome Vale is a very mixed area, with a split of housing types, sizes and tenures that is roughly representative of the wider city. The ward generally sits mid-table in rankings of measures of deprivation, except for the Gill Avenue housing estate, which ranks in the top 3% most deprived areas in England, and Blackberry Hill, which ranks in the top quartile.

== Election results ==
=== 2024 election ===
Frome Vale (2 seats)
Party	Candidate	Votes	%	±%
Labour	Louis Martin	1,402	45.15	+6.11
Labour	Al Al-Maghrabi	1,339	43.12	+14.84
Green	Jen Law	899	28.95	+10.45
Green	Gabrielle Lobb	724	23.32	+3.18
Conservative	Pooja Poddar	447	14.40	−18.10
Conservative	Tulsidas Poddar	377	12.14	−6.57
Liberal Democrats	Rochelle Amos	214	6.89	+1.37
Liberal Democrats	Keith Fenner	214	6.89	+1.73
SDP	Tommy Trueman	188	6.05	+3.18
TUSC	John Healy	86	2.77	+2.77
Turnout		3,105	31.18	−8.07
Labour hold				
Labour gain from Conservative				

=== 2021 election ===
Frome Vale (2 seats)
Party	Candidate	Votes	%	±%
Labour	Amal Ali	1,521	39.04	+1.57
Conservative	Lesley Alexander	1,266	32.49	−10.03
Labour	Mike Wollacott	1,102	28.29	−2.33
Conservative	Pooja Poddar	729	18.71	−13.47
Green	Jesse Meadows	721	18.51	+3.44
Green	Ed Fraser	716	18.38	+8.95
Liberal Democrats	Bev Knott	215	5.52	−0.33
Liberal Democrats	Keith Fenner	201	5.16	+1.36
SDP	Tommy Trueman	112	2.87	+2.87
Turnout		3,896	39.25	−5.89
Conservative hold				
Labour hold				

=== 2016 election ===
Frome Vale (2 seats)
Party	Candidate	Votes	%	±%
Conservative	Lesley Ann Alexander	1,744	42.52	
Labour	Nicola Jane Bowden-Jones	1,537	37.47	
Conservative	James Charles Hinchcliffe	1,320	32.18	
Labour	Bill Payne	1,256	30.62	
Green	Cath Thomas	618	15.07	
Green	Paul Masri	387	9.43	
Liberal Democrats	John Patrick Hassell	240	5.85	
Liberal Democrats	Benjamin Goldstrom	156	3.80	
Turnout		4,102	45.14	
Conservative hold		Swing		
Labour hold		Swing		
