= Eastville, Bristol =

Area of Bristol, England

Coordinates: 51.4750°N 2.5574°W

Eastville
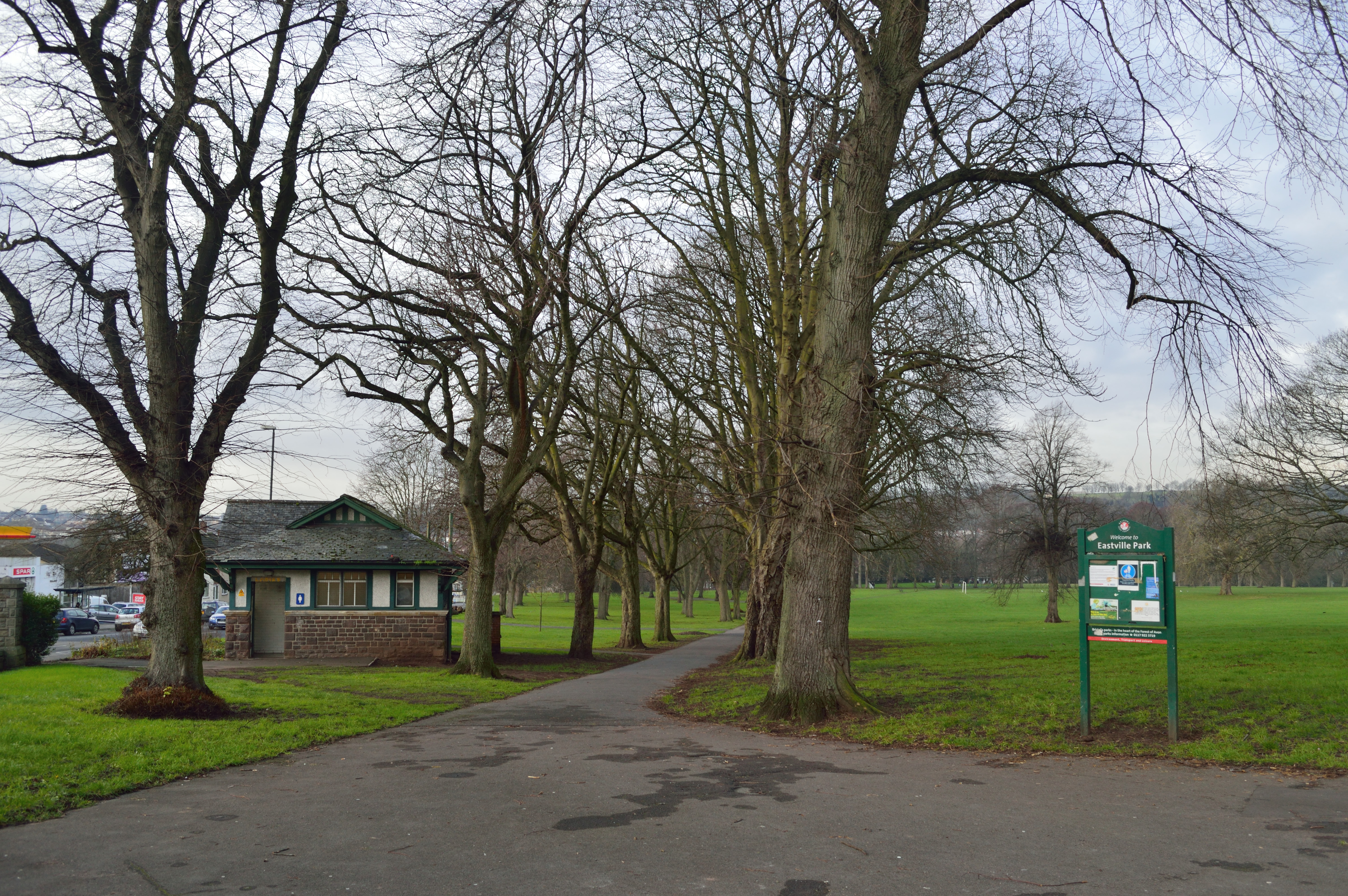
- Eastville Park

- Location within Bristol
- Population: 14,865 (ward)
  - Density: 4,175.7 per km^{2} (ward)
- Households: 6,099 (ward)
- OS grid reference: ST613752
- Unitary authority: Bristol
- Ceremonial county: Bristol
- Region: South West
- Country: England
- Sovereign state: United Kingdom
- Post town: BRISTOL
- Postcode district: BS5
- Dialling code: 0117
- Police: Avon and Somerset
- Fire: Avon
- Ambulance: South Western
- UK Parliament: Bristol North East
- Councillors: Lorraine Francis (Green); Ed Fraser (Green)

Eastville is an inner suburban neighbourhood and an electoral ward in Bristol, England, located around 2 miles (3.2 km) northeast of The Centre. It is roughly centred on Muller Road between its junctions with Stapleton Road and Fishponds Road.

Eastville is known for Eastville Park, a large park with a small lake, just to the east of the M32. The lake at Eastville Park was constructed as an unemployment relief scheme following a campaign by Ernest Bevin.

The River Frome flows roughly south-southwest through the neighbourhood, and has been closely shadowed by the M32 motorway since its construction in the early 1970s. The motorway crosses the neighbourhood on an elevated flyover over its junction with Muller Road, creating community severance.

On the west bank of the Frome is Eastgate shopping centre, home to a large IKEA and Tesco. The site was formerly Eastville Stadium, once home of Bristol Rovers Football Club, as well as being a site for greyhound racing and speedway.

== Location and boundaries ==
As an informally defined neighbourhood, originating as a hamlet within the parish of Stapleton, Eastville long existed without official boundaries, and the area that has been formally defined for the electoral ward includes neighbourhoods in the north and east of the ward that might not traditionally have been thought of as part of Eastville, while omitting the western part of the area that is commonly thought of Eastville.

The M32 motorway is the western boundary of the Eastville electoral ward, meaning that areas to the west that might traditionally have been considered in Eastville, including Glenfrome Road and the Old Eastville Library on Muller Road, are in Lockleaze electoral ward rather than Eastville electoral ward.

== History ==
A large railway viaduct known as 'The Thirteen Arches' for obvious reasons, once ran through the area, roughly parallel to the current Muller Road; it was demolished in 1968. This was part of the Clifton Extension Railway.

The Eastville Workhouse, originally the Barton Regis Union Workhouse, was a former French Prison which was bought from the Government circa 1832. In 1930, the Stapleton Workhouse, originally the Bristol Union Workhouse, became the Stapleton Institution and by the Second World War the site was mainly used for the care of the mentally ill and the elderly; eventually becoming Blackberry Hill Hospital.

== Electoral ward ==
Eastville
- ward Bristol City Council
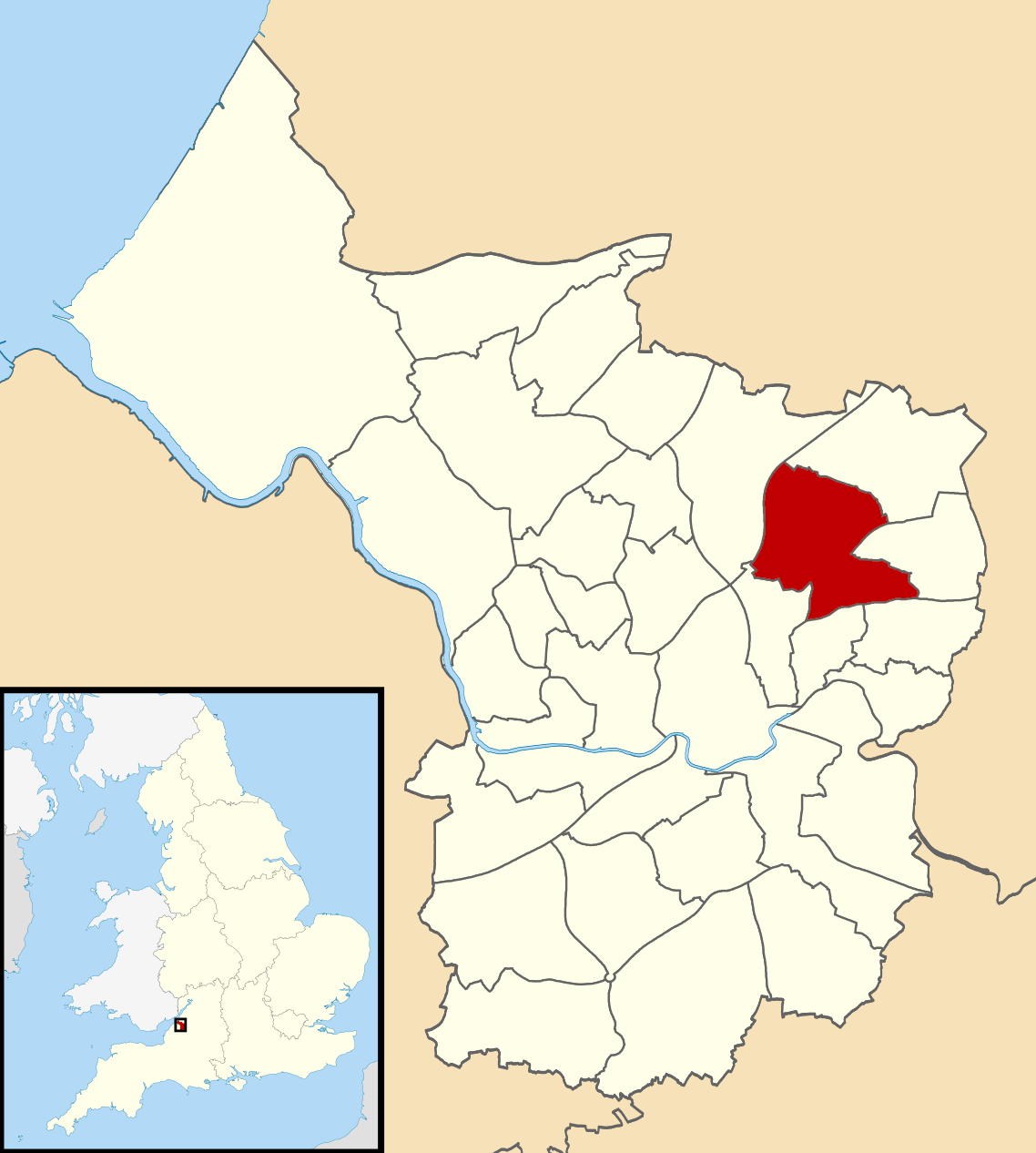
- Ward boundaries since 2016.
- County: Bristol
- Population: 14,865
- Electorate: 10,721

Current ward
- Created: 1974
- Councillor: Lorraine Francis (Green)
- Councillor: Ed Fraser (Green)
- UK Parliament constituency: Bristol North East

Eastville electoral ward includes Crofts End (also known as Clay Hill), in the east of the ward, and Stapleton, in the north. Notable places within the ward include Bristol Metropolitan Academy and Collegiate School, and the Bristol and Bath Railway Path also passes through the ward.

The ward is represented by two members of Bristol City Council, which as of 2024 are Lorraine Francis and Ed Fraser of the Green Party of England and Wales.

Eastville ward was created in 1974, electing three members to Bristol City Council and one member to Avon County Council. Boundaries were redrawn and the city council size adjusted in 198-, after which Eastville ward elected two members to the city council and one to the county council, until the abolition of the county of Avon in 1996. Boundaries were further adjusted in 1999, when parts of Greenbank that had been in Eastville ward transferred to Easton ward, and again in 2016, when Eastville gained parts of Whitefield Road from Hillfields ward, and lost parts of Broom Hill to Frome Vale ward.

== Residents ==
- Andrew Beer (1862–1954), artist and racing pigeon expert
- Paul Potts, tenor, councillor for the ward from 1996 until 2003
