= Northern Stormwater Interceptor, Bristol =

Storm drain in Bristol, England

Northern Storm Water Interceptor
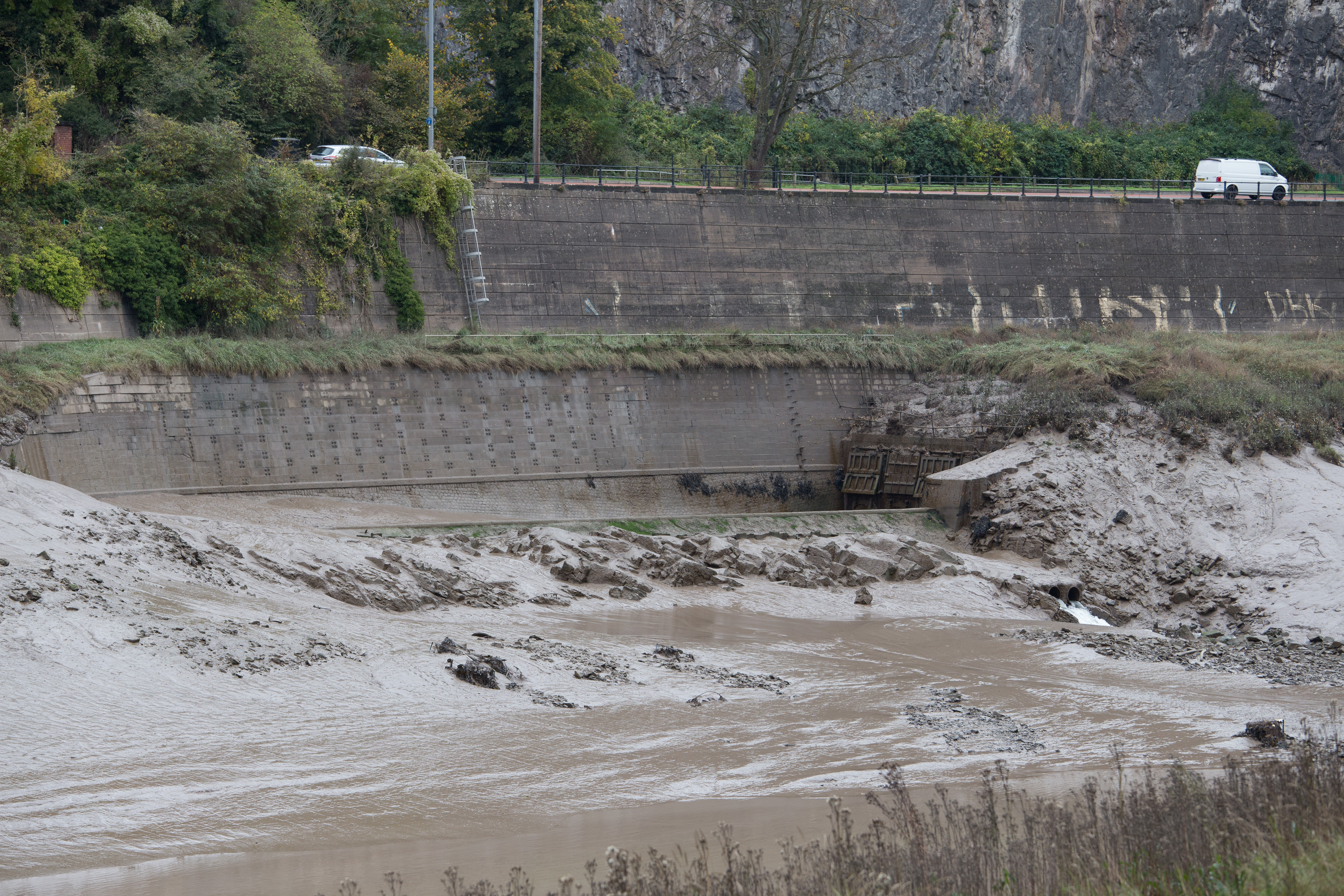
- Northern Stormwater Interceptor outlet on the River Avon
- Interactive map of Northern Storm Water Interceptor

Overview
- Location: Bristol, England
- Coordinates: 51.470°N 2.565°W
- Status: Active
- Start: Eastville (River Frome)
- End: Black Rocks, Avon Gorge (River Avon)

Operation
- Work began: September 1951
- Opened: 4 April 1962
- Owner: Bristol City Council
- Character: Storm drain

Technical
- Design engineer: Peter Steel, Bernard Smisson; A. E. Farr Ltd
- Length: 3 mi (4.8 km) (main tunnel); 7.5 mi (12.1 km) (total system)
- Width: 16 ft (4.9 m)
- Water Depth: 285 ft (87 m)

The Northern Storm Water Interceptor (NSWI) is a large stormwater tunnel that serves as a critical flood prevention measure for Bristol, England. Designated as a Significant Flood Risk Asset by Bristol City Council, it is a key component of the city's flood defence network, operating alongside infrastructure such as the Airport Road Tunnel and the Malago Interceptors (built following the Great Flood of 1968 which inundated Bedminster and Ashton). The Malago Interceptor performs a similar function to the NSWI, diverting the River Malago underground through Southville to the New Cut.

Long-term flood risk strategies identify climate change and rising sea levels as significant threats to the NSWI's future efficacy. As sea levels rise, the window of time during which the NSWI can freely discharge into the River Avon via gravity will decrease. Increased occurrences of tide-locking could limit the system's performance, potentially increasing flood risks upstream in Eastville and the city centre during combined heavy rainfall and high-tide events.

== History ==
The requirement for a comprehensive drainage scheme for Bristol was recognised as early as 1898, driven by the city's expanding population and the increasing pollution of the rivers Avon and Frome, alongside the perennial problem of flooding in low-lying areas. Although ready for implementation by 1938, the project was stalled by the outbreak of the World War II. Post-war economic austerity further hindered progress, and in May 1948 a proposal to commence the first £500,000 phase of the interceptor, specifically the section from Whiteladies Gate to the Avon Gorge, was shelved by the Ministry of Health due to national economic constraints.

In January 1950, city planners received notification that the government had placed an embargo on capital expenditure, temporarily deferring the scheme. This decision drew criticism from local officials who argued the drainage work was already 50 years overdue. Permission to proceed was finally granted in 1951, by which time inflationary pressures had driven the estimated cost of the wider drainage scheme from £2 million to £2.5 million. The project was inaugurated by the Minister of Housing and Local Government, Charles Hill, in April 1962. Upon its inception, the collective drainage system was described by the city's Medical Officer of Health as Bristol's "largest civil engineering project" of the 20th century.

== Construction ==
Construction of the storm drain commenced in September 1951 to alleviate flooding across northern and eastern parts of Bristol, specifically areas such as Whiteladies Gate, Hampton Road, Cheltenham Road, and Mina Road. The project was completed in 1962 at a cost of approximately £3 million. The tunnel is approximately 16 ft (4.9 m) in diameter and extends from the River Frome at Eastville to the Black Rocks Quarry in the Avon Gorge—a distance of roughly 3 miles (4.8 km). The entire system comprises over 7 miles (11 km) of tunnels.

The tunnel was designed by Bristol City Engineers, including Peter Steel and Bernard Smisson, starting in 1947. Excavation required blasting through massive limestone, dolomitic conglomerate, and Keuper marl under Clifton Down and The Downs. Smisson invented the Energy Dissipating Vortex Drop Pipe System, of which two were installed along the tunnel. This technology has subsequently been adopted in infrastructure projects in Chicago, New York, and closer to home in Plymouth. To minimise damage to surface property, the amount of explosives for excavation used was strictly limited. The tunnel is lined with a concrete layer 375 mm (14.8 in) thick. At its deepest point, the tunnel sits 285 ft (87 m) below ground. Construction was carried out by A. E. Farr Ltd.

Significant engineering challenges were overcome during construction. In 1962, a section of the tunnel running under a busy main road was constructed using a pipe-jacking or thrust-boring technique, the largest of its kind in Britain at the time, to avoid disrupting surface traffic and utility networks. Access shafts were sunk at various locations including Clifton Down railway station, Cotham Hill, and St Andrew's Park. Spoil from the excavation was removed via a tramway within the tunnel to the Portway, avoiding heavy lorry traffic through residential areas. A shaft located at Cotham Gardens, dominated by a large pit-headgear structure, became locally notorious as the "coal mine" due to the noise of round-the-clock works; it was dismantled in July 1959. The final breakthrough connecting the Portway section to the River Frome at Eastville was achieved on 6 October 1960. Construction of the intake at Eastville Sluices required the appropriation of a portion of the car park at Eastville Stadium, then home of Bristol Rovers F.C.; the council agreed to construct a temporary car park at the eastern end of the stadium to compensate for the lost space.

The NSWI was built as part of the broader Bristol Regional Foul Water Drainage Scheme. This was a separate system intended to intercept sewage outfalls that previously discharged directly into the River Avon. The Northern Foul Water Interceptor runs parallel to the NSWI for a significant portion of its route. To facilitate the phased construction of the sewage network, the NSWI was temporarily utilised to carry sewage during the first phase of the foul water scheme. Sewage was discharged into the storm tunnel and pumped out at Black Rocks Quarry, allowing the foul water interceptors to be completed in stages. The scale of the operation presented safety risks; in 1955, a worker named Bolestan Krysiacak sustained severe injuries after falling from a locomotive transporting workers to the operational face.

== Operation ==
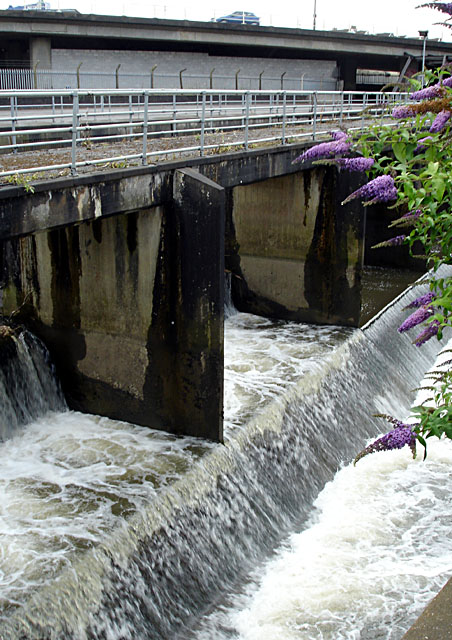
View of the Eastville Sluices, the intake of the NSWI

The NSWI functions as a primary flood defence for the River Frome catchment. Its purpose is to divert high water volumes away from the culverted sections of the Frome that flow beneath Bristol city centre and the Floating Harbour, thereby protecting the central area from fluvial flooding.

The system's intake is managed at the Eastville Sluices, situated on the River Frome near Eastville Park. This complex utilises a system of automated vertical sluice gates. Under normal flow conditions, the river continues its course into the city centre culverts and the Floating Harbour. However, when river levels surpass a designated threshold, the gates activate to divert a portion of the floodwater into the NSWI. This diversion is critical because the channel capacity through the urbanised lower reaches of the Frome is insufficient to handle extreme flood events, such as a 1% annual exceedance probability (AEP) flood, without the interceptor's capacity. The NSWI operates in conjunction with upstream attenuation measures, such as the Tubbs Bottom detention reservoir in Iron Acton, which regulates peak flows entering the system from the upper catchment.

The tunnel discharges into the River Avon at Black Rocks in the Avon Gorge, located downstream of the Clifton Suspension Bridge. The outfall structure is fitted with tide flaps to prevent the ingress of tidal water from the Avon, which experiences the second-highest tidal range in the world. Since the River Avon is tidal at the discharge point, the NSWI's efficiency is affected by the tide. During high spring tides, the tide flaps close to prevent backflow into the tunnel, creating a tide-locked condition. Although it is estimated that the outfall can still discharge approximately 60% of flow during tide-locking, substantial volumes of floodwater must be stored within the tunnel itself until the tide recedes.

The interceptor's efficacy was demonstrated during the severe storms of July 1968. While the River Frome overflowed at Stapleton Road for approximately two hours, the City Engineer reported that the NSWI worked at its maximum capacity (estimated at 750,000 gallons per minute at low tide), successfully preventing disastrous flooding of Broadmead.

In 1994, a £180,000 refurbishment of the Eastville Sluice complex was undertaken by the National Rivers Authority. This project involved the overhaul of the electrical and mechanical systems, the replacement of lifting wires on the gates, and the upgrading of the weed screens that prevent debris from entering and blocking the tunnel. Future management of flood risk in the Eastville area remains under consideration.

== Commemoration ==
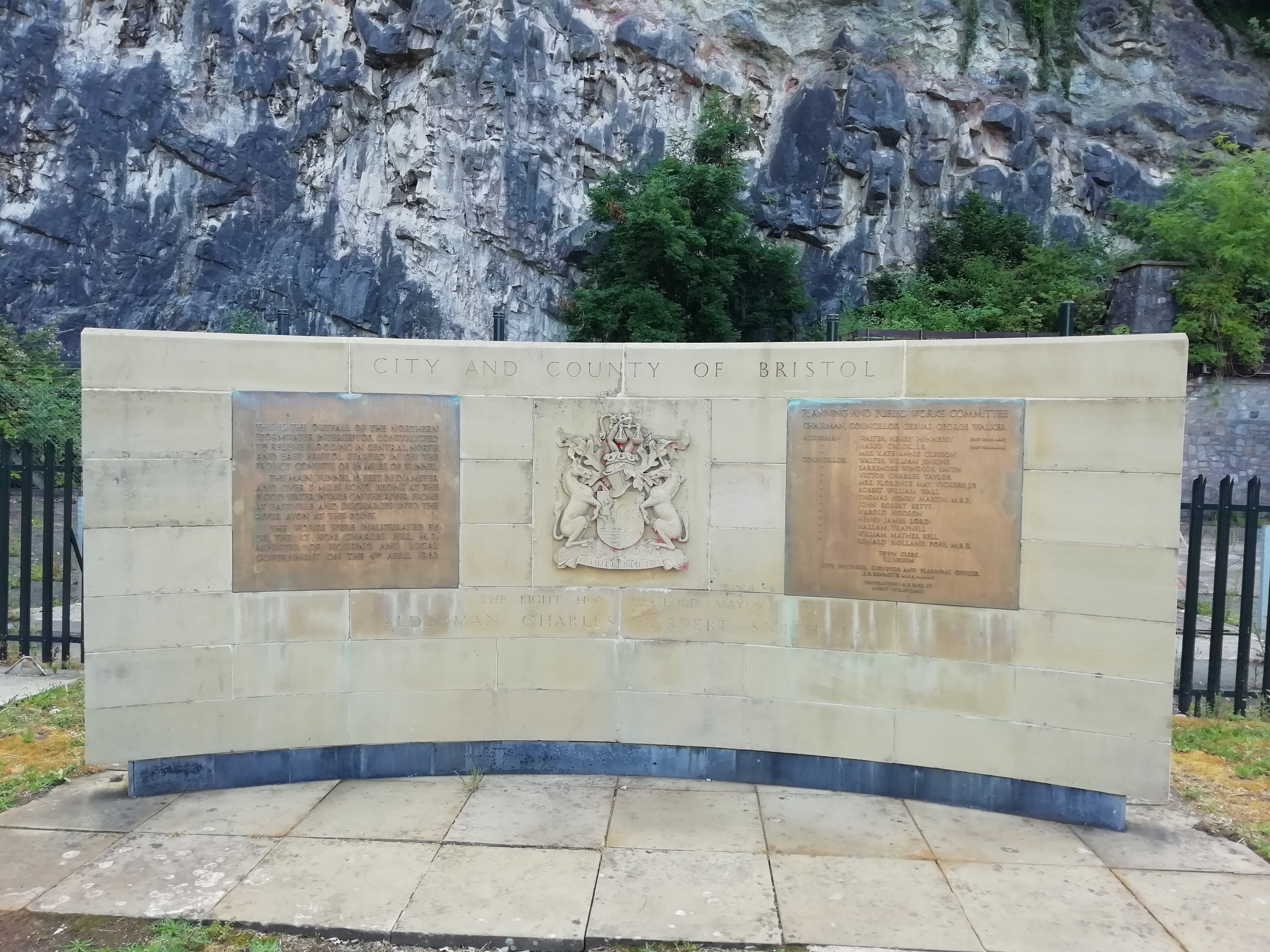
Plaque near the outfall of the Northern Storm Water Interceptor

A plaque commemorating the construction of the tunnel is located just across the Portway road from the outfall. It reads:

This is the outfall of the Northern Stormwater Interceptor constructed to relieve flooding in the central North and East of Bristol. Started in 1951 the project consists of 7 1/2 miles of tunnel.

The main tunnel is 16 feet in diameter and over 3 miles long, begins at the flood water intake on the River Frome at Eastville and discharges into the River Avon at this point.

The works were inaugurated by Dr. the Rt. Hon. Charles Hill, M.P. Minister of Housing and Local Government on the 4th April 1962

== See also ==
- Tunnel and Reservoir Plan, the "Deep Tunnel" system in Chicago.
- Thames Tideway Tunnel, a major deep-level tunnel currently under construction in London.
- Lee Tunnel, the first phase of the London tideway improvements.
- SMART Tunnel, a dual-purpose storm water and road tunnel in Kuala Lumpur.
- Metropolitan Area Outer Underground Discharge Channel, a flood diversion facility in Japan.
