= William Beer =

William Beer may refer to:

- William Andrew Beer (1862–1954), British painter who worked as Andrew Beer
- Will Beer (born 1988), English cricketer

== See also ==
- Billy Beer, American beer brand
- Billy Beer (footballer) (1879–1958), English footballer
