= Church of Holy Trinity, Stapleton =

Anglican church in Bristol, England

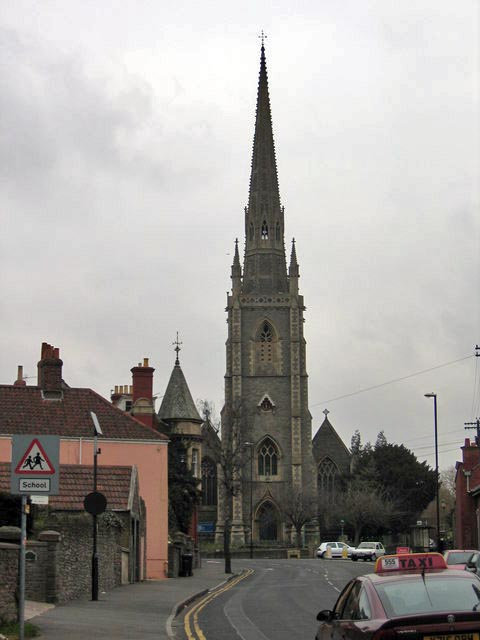

- Location within Bristol

Religion
- Affiliation: Anglican
- District: Stapleton

Location
- Location: Bristol, England
- Interactive map of Church of Holy Trinity, Stapleton
- Coordinates: 51.48149°N 2.5549°W

Architecture
- Architect: John Norton
- Style: Victorian Gothic
- Completed: 1857

Specifications
- Spire: 1
- Spire height: 52 m (170 ft)

The Church of Holy Trinity is an Anglican church on Bell Hill in Stapleton, Bristol, England. It has been designated as a grade II* listed building.

It was built in 1857 by John Norton, in a Gothic Revival style, with a spire which reaches 52 metres (171 ft). It is believed that a church has occupied this site for at least 500 years. The rebuilding of the church was funded by James Henry Monk, Bishop of Gloucester and Bristol. Pennant stone from the local Broom Hill quarry, was used in the construction, with Bath Stone dressings. It has a three-bay chancel and five-bay nave.

Inside the church is a font in the West porch dates from around 1000 AD. There is also a Victorian ornate font with a cover, which was imported from another church. The organ, by Vowles of Bristol was installed in the 1970s. There is a stained glass window dating from 1887 which was made by Charles Eamer Kempe. One of the other windows is a memorial to Captain Gore-Langton, the son of William Gore-Langton (1760–1847). who died at the Battle of Waterloo.

In 2015 an appeal to raise £250,000 for repairs to the fabric of the building and the roof. The state of the tower means that the six bells it holds may not be safe to ring.

The parish is part of the benefice of Frenchay and Stapleton within the Diocese of Bristol.

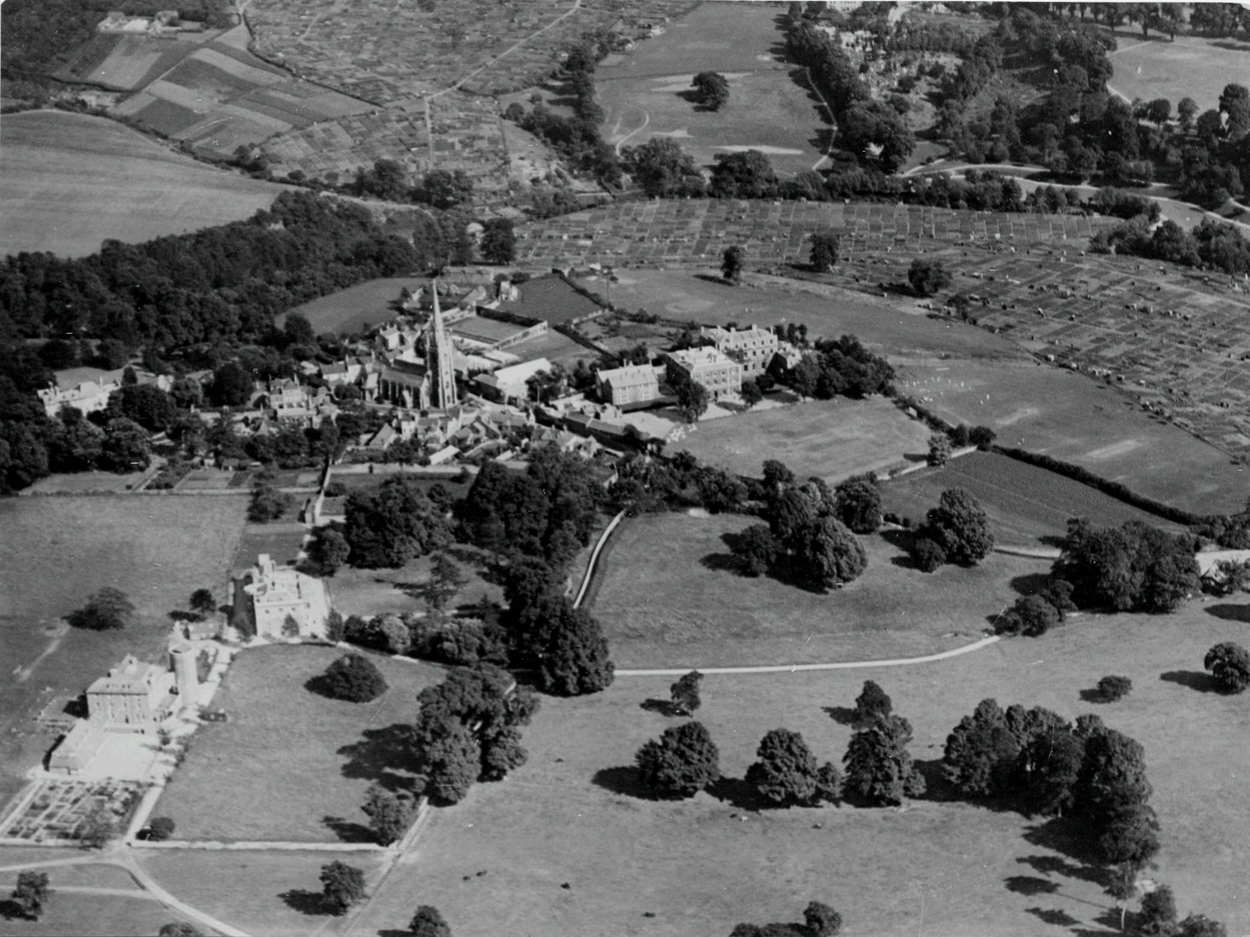
c. 1930s photograph showing an aerial view of the church from the north west, with the buildings of the surrounding settlement of Stapleton including fields, trees and allotments.

== Archives ==
Parish records for Holy Trinity church, Stapleton, Bristol are held at Bristol Archives (Ref. P.HTS) (online catalogue) including baptism, marriage and burial registers. The archive also includes records of St Giles' church Begbrook, the incumbent, parochial church council, churchwardens, schools and societies.

== See also ==
- Churches in Bristol
- Grade II* listed buildings in Bristol
