= Snuff Mills =

Park in Bristol, England

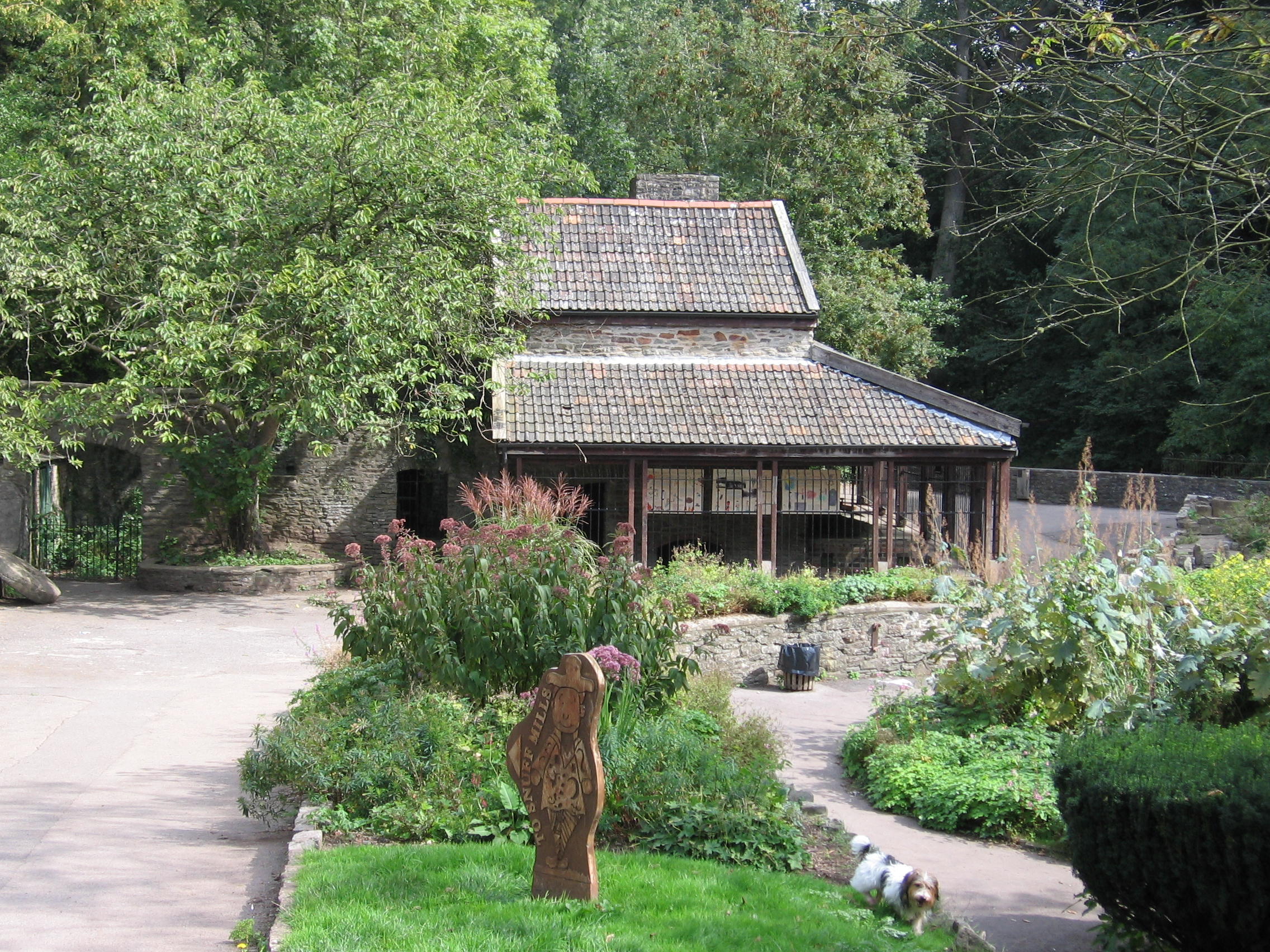
- The restored mill building at Snuff Mills
- Interactive map of Snuff Mills
- Type: Public park
- Location: Bristol, England
- Coordinates: 51°29′09″N 2°32′26″W
- Status: Open all year

Snuff Mills, Bristol

Snuff Mills is a park in the Stapleton area of north Bristol, also known as Whitwood Mill.

There are pleasant walks along the steep wooded banks of the River Frome, for example to Oldbury Court. The park was purchased in 1926 by the Corporation of Bristol as "a pleasure walk for citizens of Bristol" and restored in the 1980s by the Fishponds Local History Society.

The park's name originates from one of the millers. His nickname was 'Snuffy Jack' because his smock was always covered in snuff.

The park includes an old quarry and a stone mill. The old mill within the park was used for cutting and crushing stone from the many quarries along the Frome Valley during the late 19th century. It contains a waterwheel, egg-ended boiler in its setting and the remains of a vertical steam engine. Despite the name, tobacco snuff was never ground in this mill.

Today, Snuff Mills is still a popular site for locals and visitors who come to enjoy the tranquility and natural surroundings. This stretch of the River Frome is also home to some of Bristol's otters.
