= Francis Baylie =

Shipbuilder in Bristol, England (c.1625–80)

- Type: Private
- Industry: Shipbuilding
- Founded: c.1625
- Defunct: c.1680
- Fate: Closed
- Successor: Yard continued to operate until early 18th century
- Headquarters: River Frome, UK
- Key people: Francis Baylie (founder)

Francis Baylie (also variously spelt Bayley or Bailey) was a shipbuilder based in Bristol, England, during the 17th century, a well established merchant shipbuilder who also built warships for the English Royal Navy.

== History ==
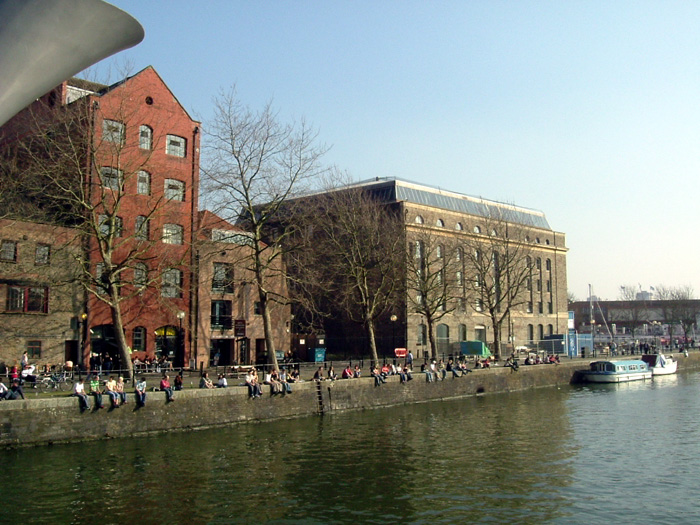
Narrow Quay in Bristol Harbour today, once the site of Baylie's yard

=== Origins ===
The yard is one of the oldest named shipbuilders in Bristol, as Lloyd's of London did not publish their lists before 1764, and Statutory Registers did not begin until 1786. The oldest known Baylie built ship is the 280 ton (bm) merchantman Charles of 1626. Francis Baylie's first recorded navy orders resulted from Parliament approval on 28 September 1652 for a fourth rate during the Commonwealth of England period. Baylie's later attracted several other orders for warships in the mid-1650s.

=== Shipyard ===
Baylie's shipyard was located in The Marsh, now predominantly laid out as the Georgian Queen Square, at an area known as 'The Gibb' or 'Gibb Taylor', a point of land which used to extend from Narrow Quay at Prince Street on the River Frome. Building had already been undertaken here since at least the 16th century, as the Frome had been diverted in 1240-47, resulting in additional invaluable land outside the city walls. Baylie's yard was at the southwest corner of the quay extended by Thomas Wright of the Society of Merchant Venturers in 1627.

When the third rate Edgar was completed in 1669 she was the biggest ship yet built in Bristol, and in Samuel Pepys diary, the Admiralty administrator talks of visiting the ship and tipping the cabin boys. She had suffered damage during the launch as the fall was too great, leading to three broken lowermost ways and damage amidships. The Speedwell, built at 'Gib Taylour' and assumed to be Baylie's, also had an unfortunate launching on 1 November 1663 when four boys and men on board drowned during the process.

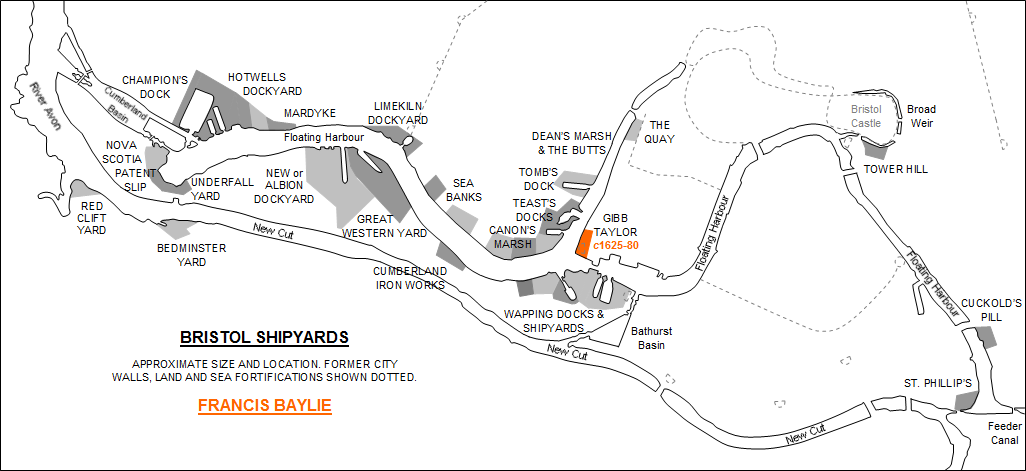
Bristol Shipyards with the yard of Francis Baylie at Gib Taylor on The Marsh highlighted

=== Closure ===
Francis Baylie died in March 1678. No further ship builds are recorded after the large 151 ft 1.75 in (46.0693 m) ship of the line Northumberland was completed, and it is likely the yard closed soon afterwards. Gibb Taylor itself continued to see shipbuilding until the early 18th century, when it was closed in order to extend the quays and provide additional wharves for cargo.

== Ships built by Francis Baylie ==
=== Naval ===
Known naval ships built by Francis Baylie

- Islip. 22-gun sixth rate ship
- Nantwich later named Breda. 40-gun fourth rate frigate
- St Patrick (1666). 50-gun fourth rate frigate
- Edgar (1668). 70-gun third rate ship of the line
- Oxford (1674). 54-gun third rate frigate
- Northumberland (1679). 70-gun third rate ship of the line

=== Merchant ===
Known merchant ships built by Francis Baylie

- Charles (1626). 280 t merchantman
- Speedwell (1663). merchantman
