= Collegiate School, Bristol =

Private day school in Bristol, England

Collegiate School

Location
- Bell Hill; Stapleton; Bristol, BS16 1BJ; England; 51.4806°N 2.5554°W

Information
- Type: Private day school
- Motto: Go and do thou likewise
- Established: 1710; 316 years ago
- Founder: Edward Colston
- Department for Education URN: 109336 Tables
- Chairman of Governors: T. Ross
- Headmaster: Jeremy McCullough
- Head of Lower School: David Edwards
- Gender: Mixed
- Age: 2 to 18
- Enrolment: 751
- Capacity: 823
- Houses: Aldington, Dolphin, King's, Roundway
- Colours: Navy and Gold
- Website: https://collegiate.org.uk/

Collegiate School (formerly known as Colston's Collegiate School and Colston’s School) is a private day school in Bristol, England, and is a member of the Headmasters' and Headmistresses' Conference.

It was founded in 1710 by the merchant, slave trader, philanthropist and Member of Parliament Edward Colston as Colston's Hospital, originally an all-boys boarding school. Day-boys were admitted in 1949 and girls were admitted to the sixth form in 1984. In 1991 it merged with the Collegiate School, a girls' school in Winterbourne, and was given the name Colston's Collegiate School, but this was reverted to Colston's School in 2005. The current headmaster of the upper school is Jeremy McCullough (since September 2014); he joined the school from Lancing College.

== Motto ==
The school motto Go and do thou likewise, was the motto for the Colston family. It is also one of the mottos for Colston's Girls' School. Its origin is Luke 10:37, the conclusion of the parable of the Good Samaritan.

== Beginnings ==
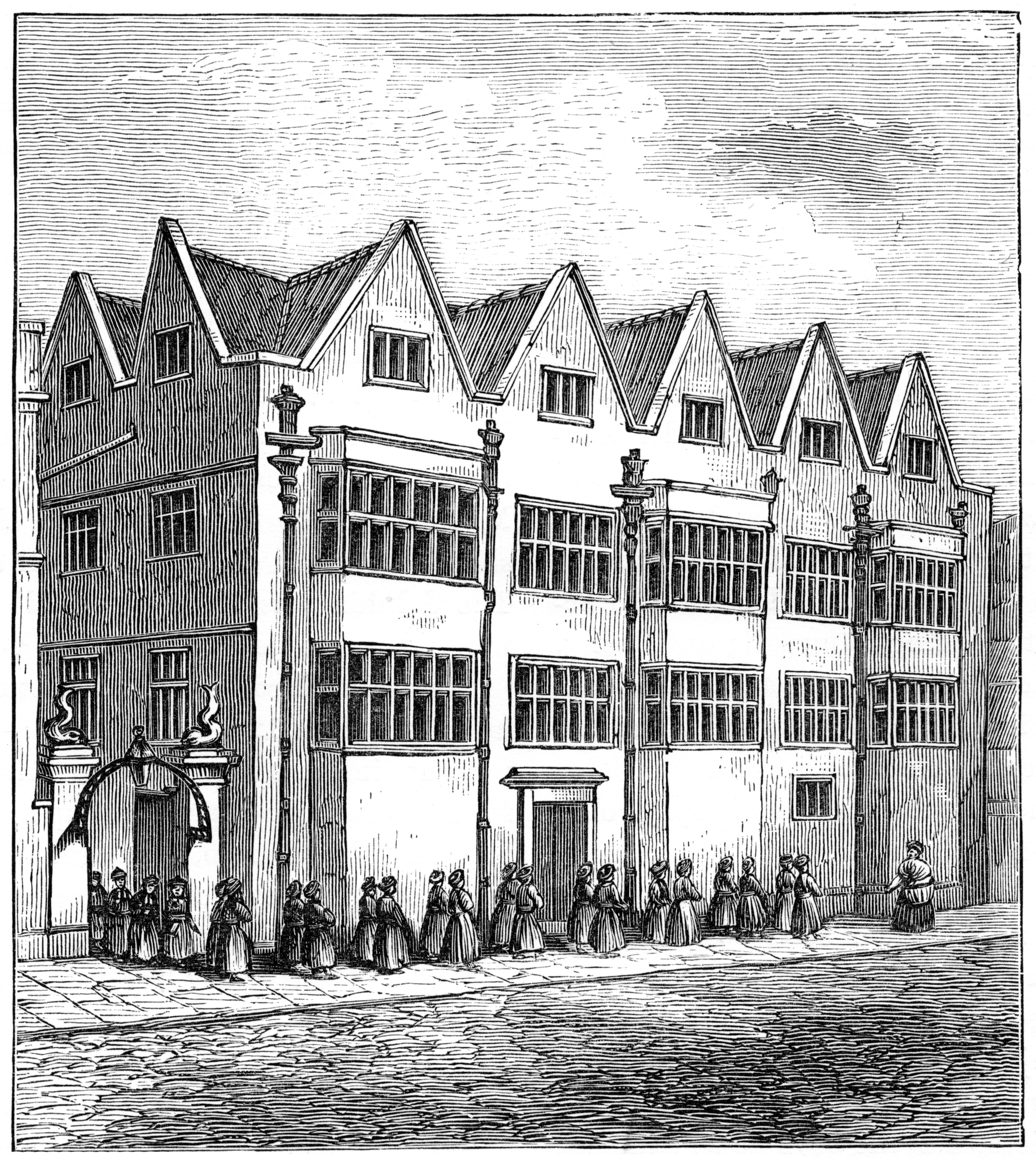
Colston's School on St Augustine's Back

Colston made a donation to Queen Elizabeth's Hospital in 1702 and proposed endowing places for a further 50 boys. This came to nothing, probably because of Colston's insistence that the children of Dissenters should be excluded. Instead, he persuaded the Society of Merchant Venturers to manage a school he established for 50 boys on Saint Augustine's Back, where the Bristol Beacon now stands. It cost him £11,000 on capital cost and an endowment income of over £1,300. The boys (soon increased to 100) were admitted between the ages of seven and ten years and stayed for seven years. The curriculum covered reading, writing and arithmetic, and the church catechism. On leaving they were to be apprenticed to a trade. Colston was opposed to Dissent and proposed that any boy who attended a service of worship in any place other than an Anglican church should be expelled. He also told the Merchant Venturers that if they apprenticed a boy to a Dissenter they would be in breach of their Trust.

In 1794 its master was James Gadd, of Temple Street. The school moved in 1861 to the old Bishops' Palace at Stapleton, which is a grade II listed building, and ceased to be a charity institution with a limited curriculum. It also accepted fee-paying boys as well as the 100 boys on the charity foundation. By 1955 the school had 35 foundation scholars, selected by open competition, among its 200 boarders and 100 day boys.

== Name ==
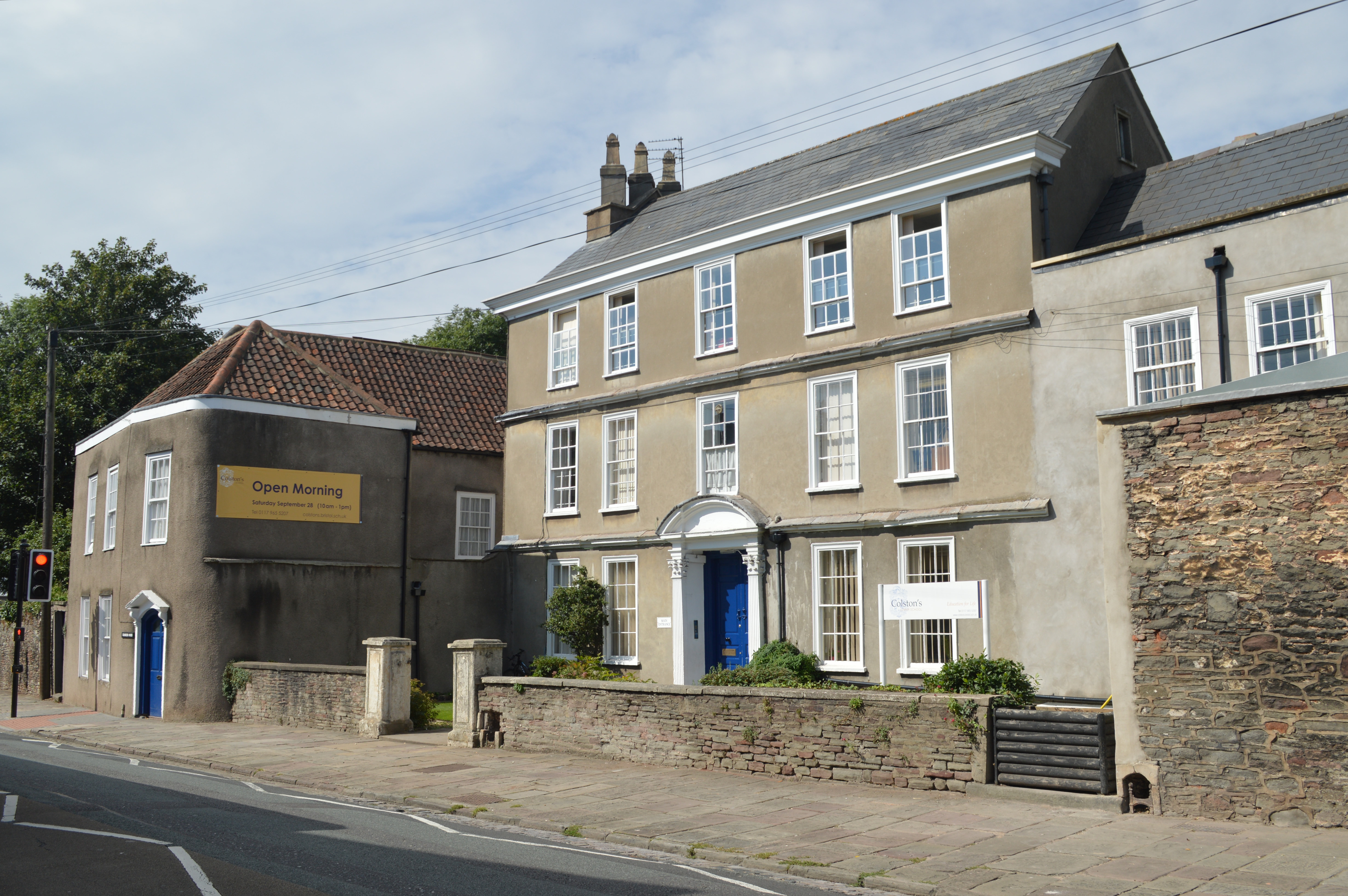
The lower school in 2013

In April 2022, the school announced that, from September, it will be known as Collegiate School, Bristol. The change followed consultations over the desire to drop the reference to Edward Colston, a notorious slave trader, in its name. The school merged with the Collegiate School in Winterbourne in 1991.

== Facilities ==
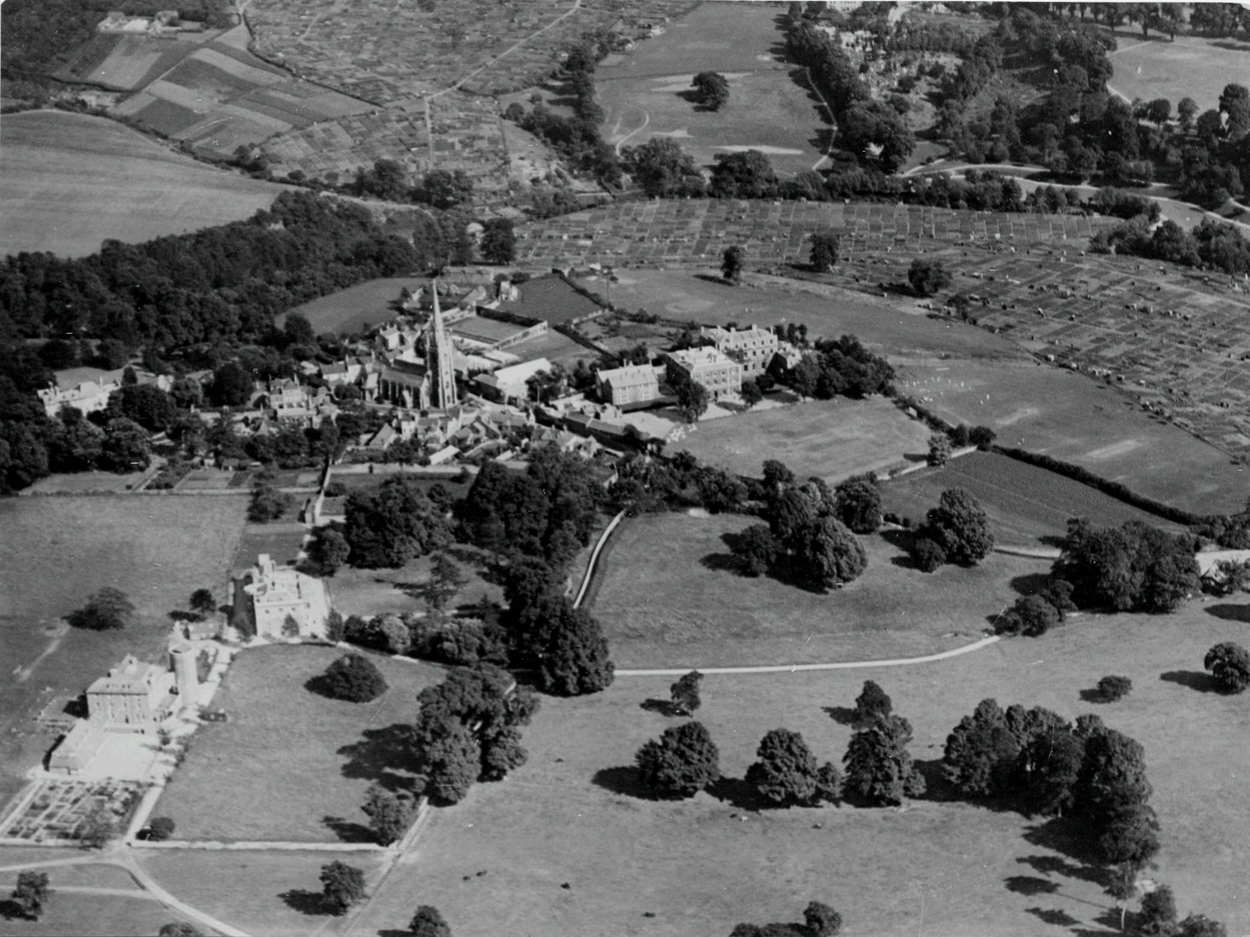
Black and white photograph from c.1930s showing the Church of Holy Trinity, Stapleton and the school site.The image shows an aerial view of the church from the north-west, with the buildings of the surrounding settlement of Stapleton including fields, trees and allotments.

Collegiate’s sporting legacy is supported by a wide range of facilities, dispersed over 30 acres of landscaped grounds - on site; unique to central Bristol schools. The vast open spaces include areas of woodland, which make it an ideal venue for Collegiate pupils to explore and create a challenging cross country circuit. The site includes an athletics field with pavilion, 6 rugby pitches, 2 cricket squares, a floodlit all-weather hockey pitch, 6 floodlit tennis courts/ 4 floodlit netball courts, a fully equipped fitness suite, 2 squash courts, table tennis facilities, a sports hall with 4 badminton courts/ basketball court, indoor cricket nets and an axe throwing range.

== Activities ==
=== Drama ===
It is the only school in Bristol that can offer all 14 GCSE theatre options. There are a number of shows throughout the year across the age range, including GCSE A-Level and Drama Club productions. In May 2010 Year 9 students devised and produced their own version of Cinderella which raised just short of £1000 for the charity Barnardo's.

=== Cadet Force ===
The school's Combined Cadet Force (CCF) of 256 cadets, the largest since its formation in 1915, and the biggest in Bristol. The CCF has Army, Royal Air Force and Royal Navy sections and is compulsory for Year 9 and Cadets above Year 9 are trained in teaching all sections of the CCF syllabus to aid with the 3 Permanent CCF Staff. The CCF normally parades every week and carries out activities, including rifle shooting on the school's 15m pipe range, command tasks, climbing, camouflage and concealment, flying, sailing and walking with regular camps. The Royal Navy section has access to sailing boats which are owned by The Royal Navy these include Laser Picos, Toppers and an RS200 racing boat.

== Rugby ==
The school plays rugby union. It won the NatWest Schools Cup (previously the Daily Mail Cup) at U18 level seven times, including six years in a row between 1995 and 2000. In 1999 there was a change in regulations which restricted the number of newcomers into a Sixth Form who could play in the competition. The school went on to win the competition on a further two occasions in 2000 and 2004 under these new regulations.

Over 50 old boys have played in the top tier of professional rugby with 11 players representing their countries during the professional era

Collegiate School is located at the top of Bell Hill, a road running close to the M32 motorway. The school is approximately 2.5 miles (4.0 km) from the city centre.

== Notable former pupils ==
Former students, known as Old Colstonians, include:

- Callum Braley, rugby union footballer and current Benetton rugby union footballer, International player for Italy
- Jake Polledri, rugby union footballer and current Gloucester rugby union footballer, International player for Italy
- Olly Barkley, former rugby union footballer for London Welsh and England.
- Thomas Chatterton, romantic poet and child prodigy, who died aged 17
- Jordan Crane, rugby union footballer and current Bristol player
- John Ebling, Marine Biologist and Professor of Zoology
- Shane Geraghty, rugby union footballer and current Bristol player
- Andrew Ibrahim, convicted terrorist known as 'The Boarding School Bomber'
- Peter Mathias, former Master of Downing College, Cambridge
- Lee Mears, rugby union footballer
- Alan Morley MBE, holder of world record for tries scored in first class rugby union and current board member at the Bristol Bears
- Jack Spoors, British Isles international rugby player
- Robert Syms, Conservative MP for Poole, Dorset
- Chris Taylor, Gloucester county cricketer, current England fielding coach
- Tom Varndell, rugby union footballer and current Bristol player.
- Robert Walter, former Conservative MP for North Dorset
- Amber Reed, English rugby union footballer
- Bryan Webber, theoretical physicist; co-winner (2012) of the J.J. Sakurai Prize for Theoretical Particle Physics
- Rich White, World Ranked Amateur Disability Golfer. Plays on the EDGA Tour (formerly the European Disabled Golf Association).
- George Clarke, British social media personality, YouTuber and podcast host.
