= Begbrook =

Suburb of Bristol, England

Coordinates: 51.492°N 2.533°W

Begbrook, Bristol

Begbrook is a suburb of Bristol, England, situated between Stapleton and Frenchay on the B4058, just north-west of the River Frome. It is named after the eponymous stream, which is a tributary of the River Frome. It is in the Frome Vale electoral ward of Bristol.

Begbrook Green Park and Begbrook Primary Academy are in the area.

The small Frenchay Village Museum is in Begbrook Green Park, bordering Frenchay.

== History ==
Begbrook House stood until 11 November 1913, when it was burnt out by a fire, overlooking the River Frome just north of the tributary stream. Begbrook House was owned by Hugh Thomas Coles, a banker and treasurer of Clifton College, but the twenty-room house had been unused since 1912 when he moved away. Suffragettes were suspected of making an arson attack on the house in a campaign for the release from prison of Rachel Pease and Mary Richardson, suggested by leaflets left nearby. The modern Begbrook House Care Home now stands on the site.

By 1947, Begbrook had many prefab houses which extended into what is now Begbrook Green Park.

== Transport ==
Begbrook is served by Bristol's metrobus network, with the m1, m3 and m4 metrobus services across the road from the suburb.

There are also bus stops for the 19 bus from Bristol Parkway to Bath bus station, through the nearby Frenchay, Staple Hill, Kingswood and Bitton, and the 46 and 50 buses. The 46 goes past the UWE Glenside campus and down Fishponds Road from the UWE Frenchay campus, while the 50 goes through Stapleton. Both go to Bristol city centre.
