= Crofts End =

Area of Bristol, England

Coordinates: 51.468°N 2.541°W

- Location within Bristol
- OS grid reference: ST625745
- Unitary authority: Bristol
- Ceremonial county: Bristol
- Region: South West
- Country: England
- Sovereign state: United Kingdom
- Post town: BRISTOL
- Postcode district: BS
- Dialling code: 0117
- Police: Avon and Somerset
- Fire: Avon
- Ambulance: South Western
- UK Parliament: Bristol East

Crofts End, also known as Clay Hill, is a suburban neighbourhood of Bristol, England, 2 1/2 miles (4 km) northeast of The Centre in the Eastville electoral ward. It is an industrialised area, with many small Victorian terraced houses, built when this area was a coal mining community.

Crofts End borders Eastville to the northwest, Whitehall to the southwest, St George to the south, and Speedwell to the east. To the northeast, it is separated from Fishponds by Ridgeway playing fields and Coombe Brook Nature Reserve.

== Churches ==
Crofts End Church was established in 1895 by George Brown, as a Christian work for miner's children in The Freestone Rank, Whitehall Road, it became known as The Miner's Mission. It is now part of the local and much wider community but still very much a family church. The pastor is Andrew Yelland.

The church was built on a site bounded by market gardens, a brick works and Deep Pit Colliery. When The Beaufort Arms, then known as The Beatem and Wackem and now called The Wackum Inn was the place where most miners spent their hard earned wages! Hence the need for a children's work in that community.

Another local church was Clay Hill Chapel which was demolished when the industrial estates were built.

== Industry ==
In the 1920s the area consisted primarily of market gardens and a brick and tile works with a clay pit. Over many years, the Market Gardens became housing, White's Brick Works became Somers Wood Yard (now an industrial pallet site) – and Deep Pit Colliery became industrial estates. When Deep Pit closed, men were having to walk underground as far as Frenchay to reach the coal face.

== Housing ==
Crofts End House, located at the junction of Plummer's Hill and Whitehall Avenue, still exists, but no longer as a single dwelling. It has been refurbished and is now part of a housing association development.

The area is undergoing more change as the majority of the prefabs (built by American Service-men as post war housing) in the locality have been demolished, to be replaced with modern housing.

The old, redundant Civil Defence building on the junction of Crofts End Road and Brook Road was demolished and housing association flats were built on the site, now named "Craftes Court".
