= Eastville Workhouse =

Workhouse in Bristol, England

Coordinates: 51.4702°N 2.5622°W

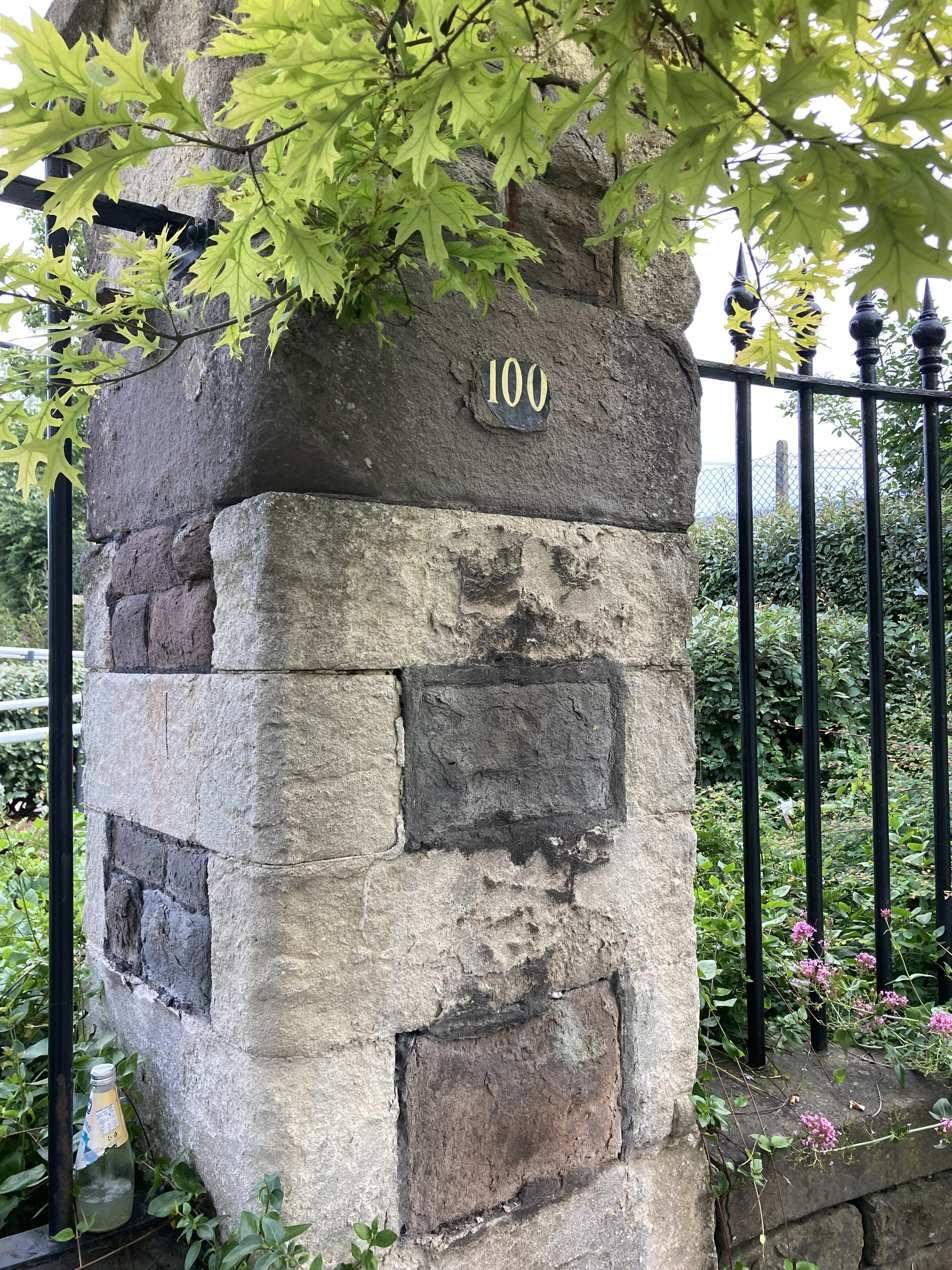
All that remains of the Eastville workhouse are the gateposts.

The Eastville Workhouse (officially named the Barton Regis workhouse) was a workhouse situated at 100 Fishponds Road, in Bristol, U.K. It was converted into a home for the elderly in the 1920s, and demolished to make way for housing in 1972.

== Workhouse ==
The workhouse was built in 1847 to a design by Samuel T. Welch as the Clifton Poor Law Union workhouse; it was renamed in 1877 when the Union was renamed Barton Regis in order to remove the stigma felt by the citizens of Clifton.

== Burial ground ==
In 2012, the site of its burial ground, long-forgotten, was identified as an area of open space known locally as Rosemary Green. Bristol Radical History Group established that more than 3500 inmates of the workhouse had been buried there between 1855 and 1895, before being crudely disinterred when the workhouse was demolished. A memorial was erected at the site in November 2015, and a second memorial was erected in 2019 at the location where they had been reburied in unmarked graves in nearby Avonview cemetery.
