= Andrew Beer =

English artist (1862–1954)

- Born: William Andrew Beer; 1862
- Died: 1954 (aged 91–92)
- Occupation: Painter
- Known for: Painting racing pigeons

William Andrew Beer (1862–1954) was an English artist, known for painting racing pigeons, in oil on canvas, under the working name of Andrew Beer. A racing pigeon enthusiast himself, he was a judge at competitive pigeon shows.

Beer had a studio in Eastville, Bristol, to which the pigeons he was to paint were sometimes sent by train, arriving at the nearby Stapleton Road Station. He typically painted pigeons at near life-size, singly or in small groups, in side-on view, against similar backgrounds. He often included text, noting the pigeons' names and achievements.

His works are in the collections of Bristol Museum & Art Gallery, Pontypridd Museum and the Radstock, Midsomer Norton & District Museum Society.

Beer also painted scenes of southern England, which were issued as postcards.
