= Oldbury Court Estate =

Park in Bristol, England

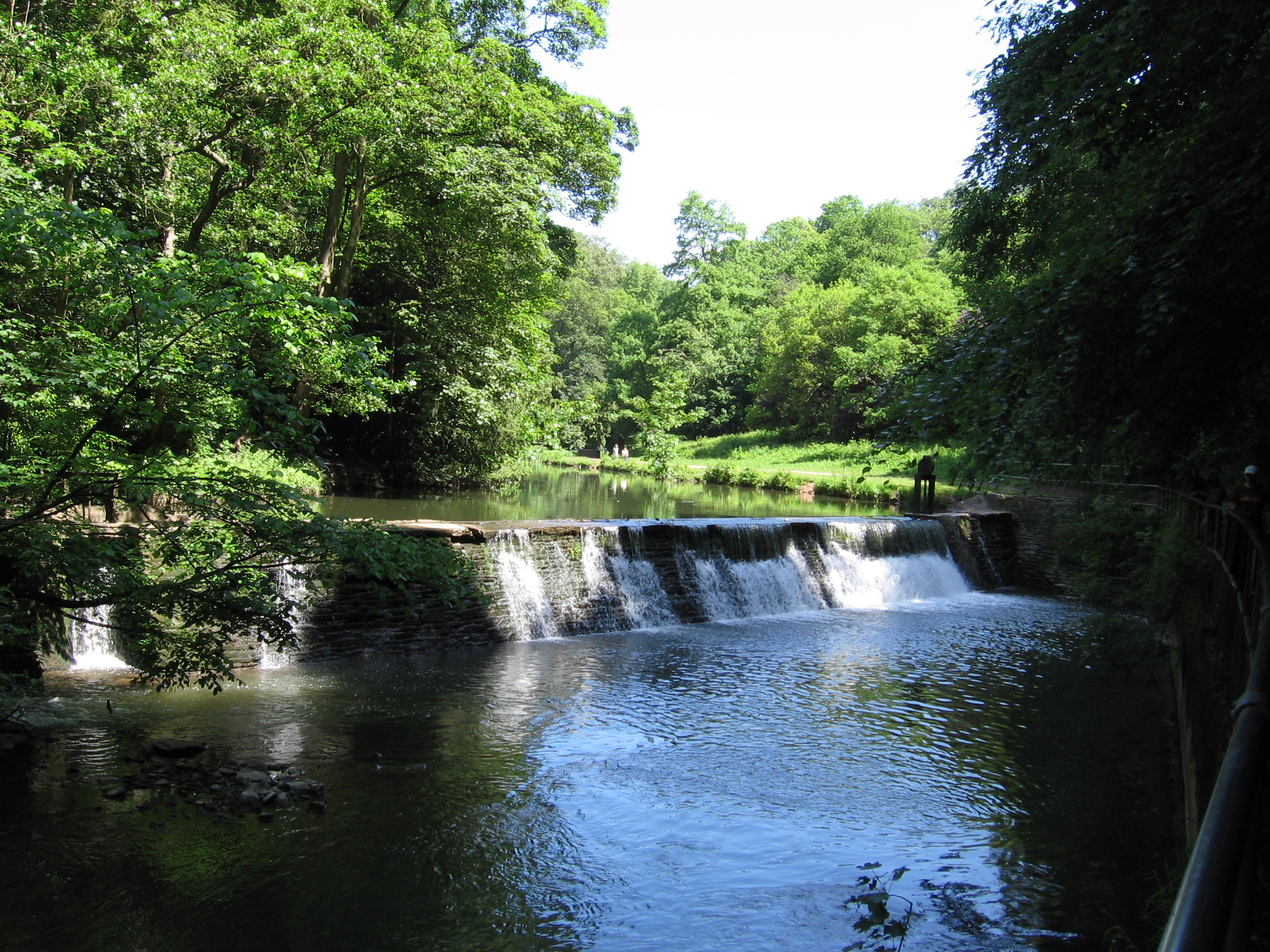
- A weir on the River Frome, along Repton's Walk
- Interactive map of Oldbury Court Estate
- Location: Fishponds, Bristol
- OS grid: ST 635 768
- Coordinates: 51°29′20″N 2°31′37″W
- Area: 23.33 hectares (57.6 acres)
- Status: Grade II listed
- Website: Oldbury Court Estate

Oldbury Court Estate is a park in Fishponds, Bristol, about 3 miles (4.8 km) north-east of the city centre.

It is a park of Bristol City Council, and is listed Grade II in English Heritage's Register of Historic Parks and Gardens of Special Historic Interest. Its area is 23.33 hectares (57.6 acres); the parkland contains woods and riverside wildlife. The paths along the River Frome form part of the Frome Valley Walkway. There are picnic areas and a children's play park.

== History ==
The estate was mentioned in the Domesday book. In 1667, Robert Winstone purchased the house and land at Oldbury, previously in the Kemys family. He later bought the land on both sides of the River Frome. Thomas Graeme purchased the estate in 1799; the landscape gardener Humphry Repton advised on laying out the grounds.

Graeme died in 1820, and the estate passed to his sister Margaret, wife of Henry Vassall. In 1937, there being no male heir, Bristol Corporation bought Oldbury Court from the Vassall family, for use as a public park. The mansion house, built about 1600, was in poor condition and was later demolished. Locally, the park is still known as "Vassall's".

== Filming location ==
During the 1980s, the estate was one of several locations used to represent Sherwood Forest in the HTV drama Robin of Sherwood.
