= River Frome, Bristol =

River in south west England

Frome Froom
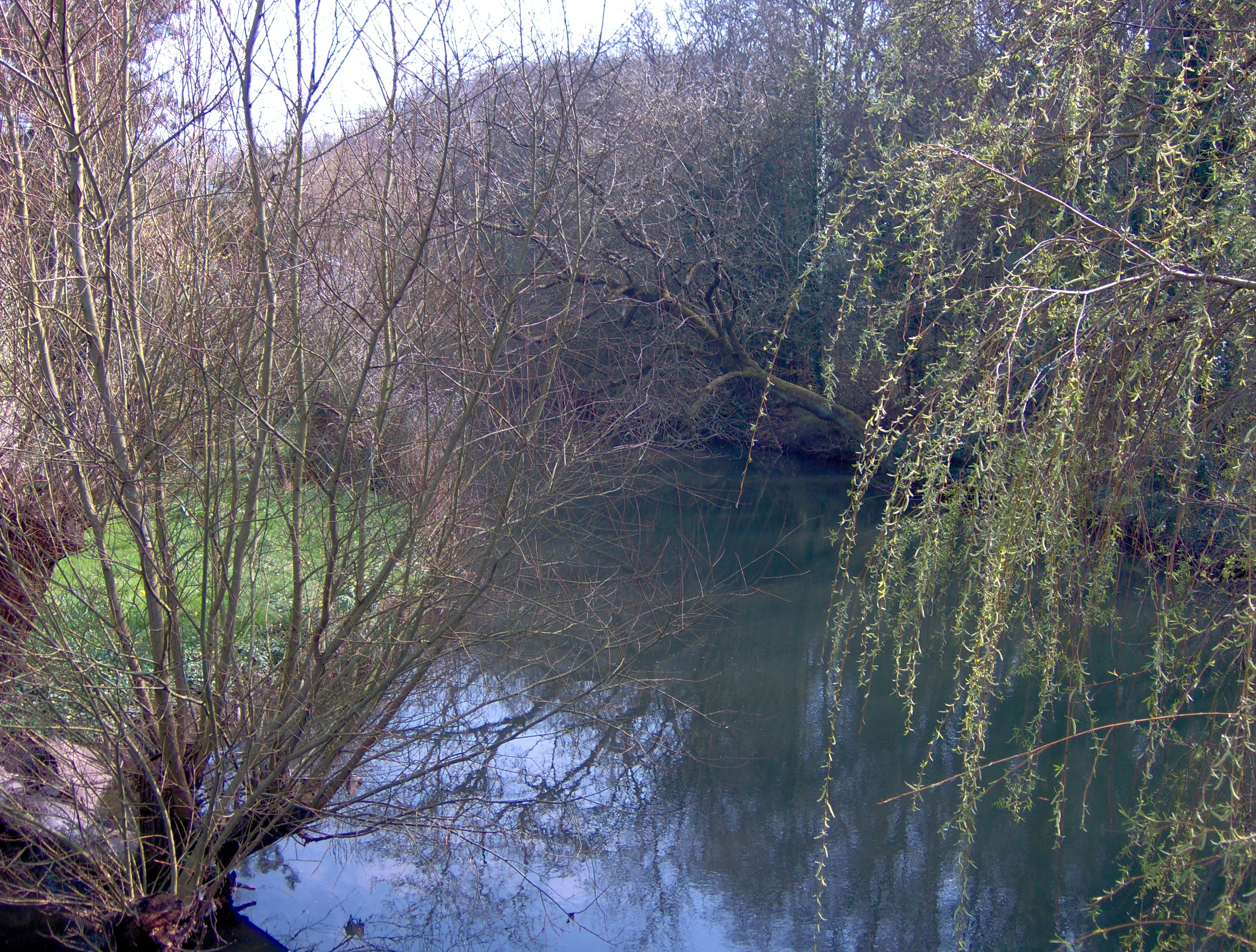
- The river at Snuff Mills

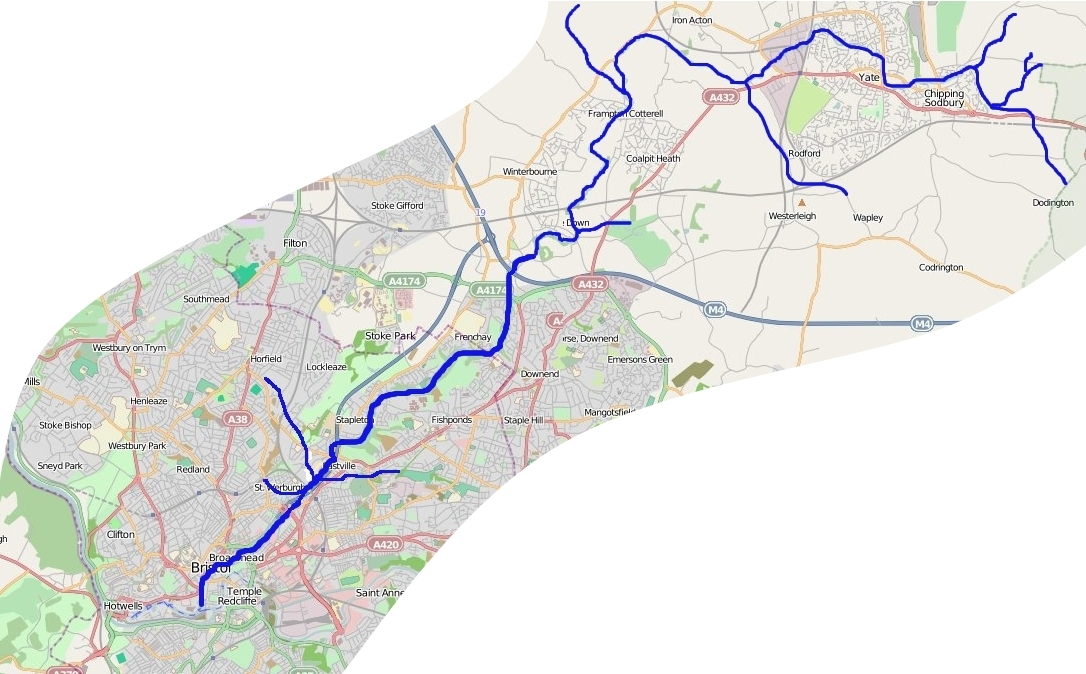
- Map of the River Frome and tributaries in Bristol and South Gloucestershire
- Etymology: British Celtic, meaning 'fair, fine, brisk'
- Nickname: Danny

Location
- Country: England
- Region: West Country
- District: South Gloucestershire, Bristol
- City: Bristol

Physical characteristics
- Source: Dodington Park
  - location: Chipping Sodbury, South Gloucestershire, England
  - coordinates: 51.510726°N 2.344268°W
  - elevation: 515 ft (157 m)
- Mouth: Floating Harbour, Bristol
  - location: Bristol, England
  - coordinates: 51.4489°N 2.5983°W
  - elevation: 33 ft (10 m)
- Length: 20 mi (32 km), south west
- Discharge
  - average: 60 cu ft/s (1.7 m^{3}/s)
  - minimum: 2.3 cu ft/s (0.065 m^{3}/s)
  - maximum: 2,473 cu ft/s (70.0 m^{3}/s)

Basin features
- Tributaries
  - left: Nibley brook, Folly brook, Fishponds brook (1, Oldbury Court); Fishponds brook (2. Black Rocks), Coombe brook
  - right: Little Sodbury brook, Horton brook, Ladden brook, Bradley brook, Ham brook (aka Stoke brook), Frenchay brook, Horfield brook (aka Cutlersmills brook)
- River system: Bristol Avon

The Frome /ˈfruːm/, historically the Froom, is a river that rises in Dodington Park, South Gloucestershire and flows southwesterly through Bristol to join the river Avon. It is approximately 20 miles (32 km) long, and the mean flow at Frenchay is 60 cubic feet per second (1.7 m^{3}/s). The name Frome is shared with several other rivers in South West England and means 'fair, fine, brisk'. The river is known locally in east Bristol as the Danny.

As with many urban rivers, the Frome has suffered from pollution, but several stretches run through parks and reserves that sustain a range of wildlife. The river's power was harnessed by many watermills, and the river mouth area was developed as shipyards by the eighteenth century. As the city of Bristol developed in the nineteenth and twentieth centuries, flooding became a major problem, remedied by the construction of storm drains and diversions.

== Etymology ==
The river's name derives from the British Celtic, meaning 'fair, fine, brisk'. It is not to be confused with other rivers in the south west of England with the same name. The historic spelling, Froom, is still sometimes used and this is how the name of the river is pronounced (as in broom). In the nineteenth and twentieth century, the River Frome became known in East Bristol as the Danny. The derivation of this name is uncertain, some suggest a nickname, taken from the Blue Danube Waltz, others that it was derived from the Australian slang word dunny.

== Course ==
20 miles (32 km) long, the River Frome rises in the grounds of Dodington Park in the Cotswolds of South Gloucestershire, flows through Chipping Sodbury in a northwesterly direction through Yate, and is then joined by the Nibley brook at Nibley and the Mayshill brook at Algars Manor near Iron Acton, both on the left. The river turns south towards the next settlement of Frampton Cotterell, where it is met by the Ladden brook on the right bank. Continuing southwards between Yate and Winterbourne, the Frome crosses Winterbourne Down, to Damsons Bridge where the Folly brook tributary merges on the left bank.

The Bradley brook joins on the right bank at Hambrook just before the river passes underneath the M4 motorway and, also on the right, the Stoke brook (or Hambrook) joins at Bromley Heath. After passing under the A4174 the Frome enters a more urban environment, passing between Frenchay on the right and Bromley Heath and Downend on the left. Turning in a more southwesterly direction the river enters Oldbury Court estate, a city park also known as Vassal's, where it is joined by the first of two Fishponds brooks both on the left. The river then passes Snuff Mills, entering a steep valley at Stapleton, where the second Fishponds brook joins, then passing Eastville park, where it feeds the former boating lake. Due to the steep valley and flood risk, the land immediately alongside the river between Frenchay and Eastville Park has not been developed, and is largely managed as public parkland, with the Frome Valley Greenway cycling and walking path following the river through a woodland landscape.

The river then flows under the M32 motorway and parallels its course for a while before disappearing into an underground culvert at Eastville Sluices, upstream of Baptist Mills. It is joined underground by Coombe brook on the left and Horfield brook on the right. A brief stretch in St Jude's is uncovered, alongside Riverside Park.

The Frome originally joined the Avon somewhere on Welsh Back downstream of Bristol Bridge, and an offshoot formed part of the city defences. In the 13th century, the offshoot was arched over or infilled and the river itself was diverted into St Augustine's Reach (also known as St Augustine's Trench), an artificial branch of the docks constructed through marshland belonging to St Augustine's Abbey (now Bristol Cathedral) as part of major port improvement works. From the mid-19th to the early 20th centuries the lower mile of the river was gradually culverted, so the river now runs underneath Broad Weir, Fairfax Street and Rupert Street.

To reduce sewage pollution and silting in the harbour, a new culvert was constructed in 1825 to redirect much of the flow from the Frome into the New Cut of the River Avon. Known as Mylne's Culvert, this runs from the site of the former Stone Bridge, near the junction of Rupert Street and Christmas Street, and follows the course of Marsh Street, Prince Street and Wapping Road, passing below the Floating Harbour in an iron siphon pipe. It discharges into the New Cut close to Gaol Ferry Bridge. The original culverted section between Stone Bridge and St Augustine's Reach remains in use as a flood relief channel.

=== Navigation ===
From Damsons Bridge (Grid Reference ST657794) to Snuff Mills (ST623764) the river is navigable, but only by canoe (kayak) though some portaging may be required. It's also possible to start at Moorend Bridge (ST650794) or Frenchay Bridge (ST644777). Some of the Bradley Brook has also been kayaked.

== History ==
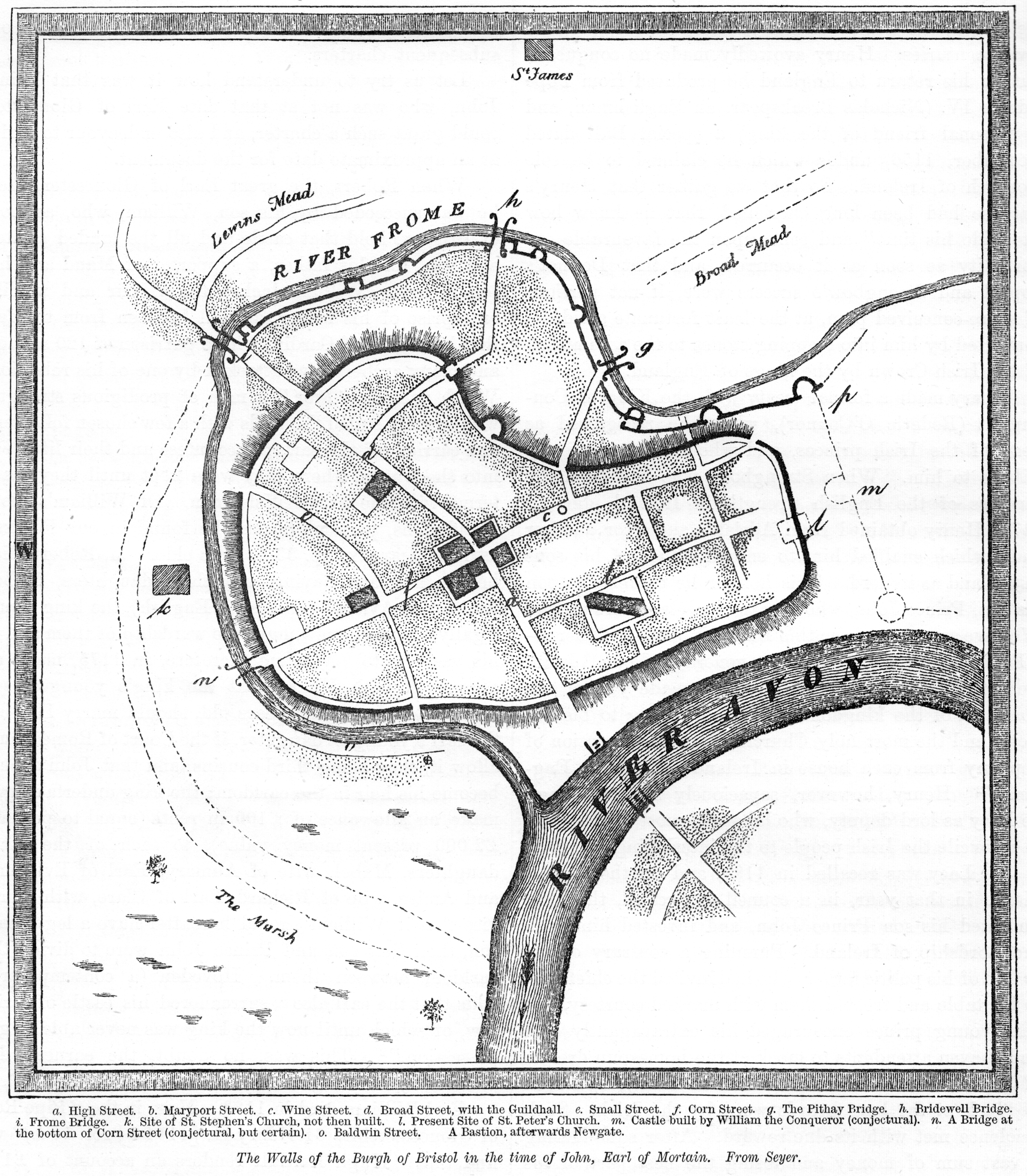
Map of Bristol Castle in the Middle Ages showing the original path of the Frome. Samuel Seyer believed it flowed farther south (the white dashed line)

Between Frenchay and Stapleton the river drops nearly 50 feet (15 m), and as a result there a number of corn and other mills were established to harness the water power. They were undershot mills with no mill ponds. Today a wheel at Snuff Mills is preserved and the mill buildings of Cleeve Mill survive as a private residence.

The Frome originally flowed east of its present-day course from Stone Bridge (now under the paved concourse at the "bow" of Electricity House) with a probable moat along the line of St Stephen's Street (formerly called Fisher Lane and Pylle End) and the old curving section of Baldwin Street (now a continuation of St Stephens's Street) and the natural river or river delta itself actually flowing farther south, all joining the Avon at Welsh Back at or south of Bristol Bridge. The narrow strip of high land rising some 45 feet above high water between the two rivers was a naturally strategic place for the Saxon settlement which became the town of Brigstowe, later the walled centre of the city, to develop. When Robert, 1st Earl of Gloucester, rebuilt Bristol Castle, from around 1110, an arm of the Frome was taken off the natural river (at present-day Broad Weir) to form the castle moat, so that the town and castle were entirely surrounded by water.

In the mid-thirteenth century the harbour, probably today's Welsh Back had become so busy that it was decided to divert the Frome into a new course through the marsh belonging to St Augustine's Abbey into a "Deep Ditch" that was dug from around a line opposite the Hippodrome of today to join the Avon opposite the present MShed. The section of meandering river back to the site of today's culverted Stonebridge was also widened out as part of the new ocean going Frome harbour. This has been the line of the mouth of the river Frome ever since, known as St Augustine's Trench or Reach.

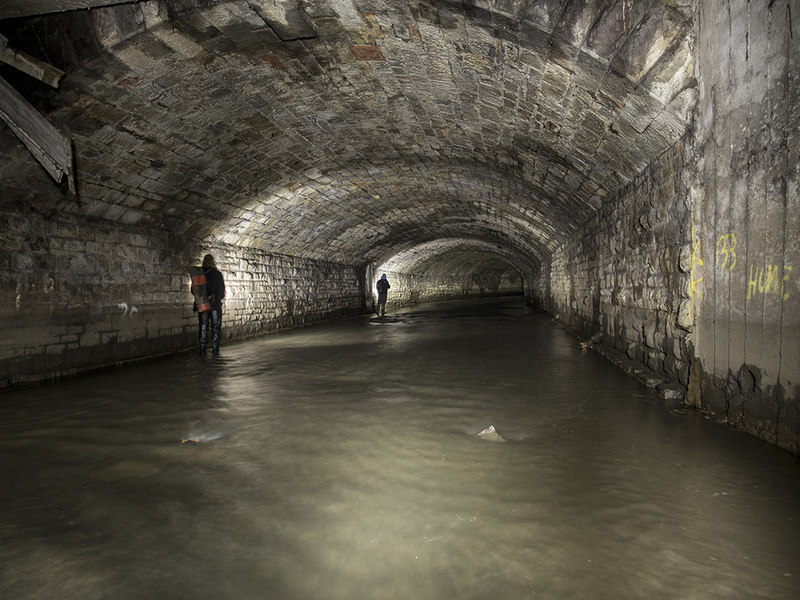
A culverted section of the Frome beneath Champion Square in St Jude's

The Floating Harbour was constructed in 1809, isolating the Avon and Frome from tides between Cumberland Basin and Totterdown Lock. The increasing use of the Frome as an open sewer combined with the loss of the scouring action of the tides meant that it was now becoming a health hazard and in 1828 it was again diverted, with a mitre floodgate at StoneBridge, channelling the main flow through Mylne's Culvert, under the quays and under the bed of the floating harbour at Prince Street Bridge to the emerge in the tidal Avon New Cut, to the east of what is now Gaol Ferry Bridge, locally known as God's Garden in the 21st century. Up to 1857 the Frome was open along its whole length, and both arms crossed by some 13 bridges. During the mid nineteenth century, a succession of culverts were built, eventually from Wade Street Bridge in St Jude's to Stone Bridge, covering this stretch completely: Rupert Street, Fairfax Street and Broad Weir now run over the remaining culverted section. St Augustine's Trench from Stone Bridge to the location of the former Draw Bridge (near the western end of Baldwin Street) was covered over between May 1892 and February 1893 and the section between that point and the foot of College Green was covered over in 1938.

=== Shipbuilding ===
Shipbuilding on the River Frome may have been carried out for centuries, with docks on the northern part of Narrow Quay (St Clement's Dock and Aldworth's Dock) being archaeologically excavated. By the seventeenth century, Francis Baylie built warships on the east bank at Narrow Quay. Tombs' Dock (later known as Green's Dock) was built opposite at Dean's Marsh in 1760, on the west bank of the Frome and was later lengthened to 435 feet (133 m), the builders including FW Green, and two additional docks were built by at Teast's Docks in 1790; a dry dock later known as Albert Dock and a mud dock at Mansfield's point, the latter filled in by 1829. The last shipbuilder closed in 1883.

== Hydrology and flooding ==
The mean flow as measured at Frampton Cottrell is 60 cubic feet per second (1.7 m^{3}/s), with a peak on 30 October 2000 of 788 cubic feet per second (22.3 m^{3}/s) and a minimum on 10 August 1990 of 1.0 cubic foot per second (0.028 m^{3}/s). The mean flow as measured at Frenchay is 60 cubic feet per second (1.7 m^{3}/s), with a peak on 10 July 1968 of 2,474 cubic feet per second (70.1 m^{3}/s) and a minimum on 9 August 1976 of 2.8 cubic feet per second (0.079 m^{3}/s).

The Environment Agency in 2008 classified the river as Grade A (highest grade) for chemical content, but the biology was assessed at C grade (mid). Measurements were taken over a stretch of river between Bradley brook and Broomhill.

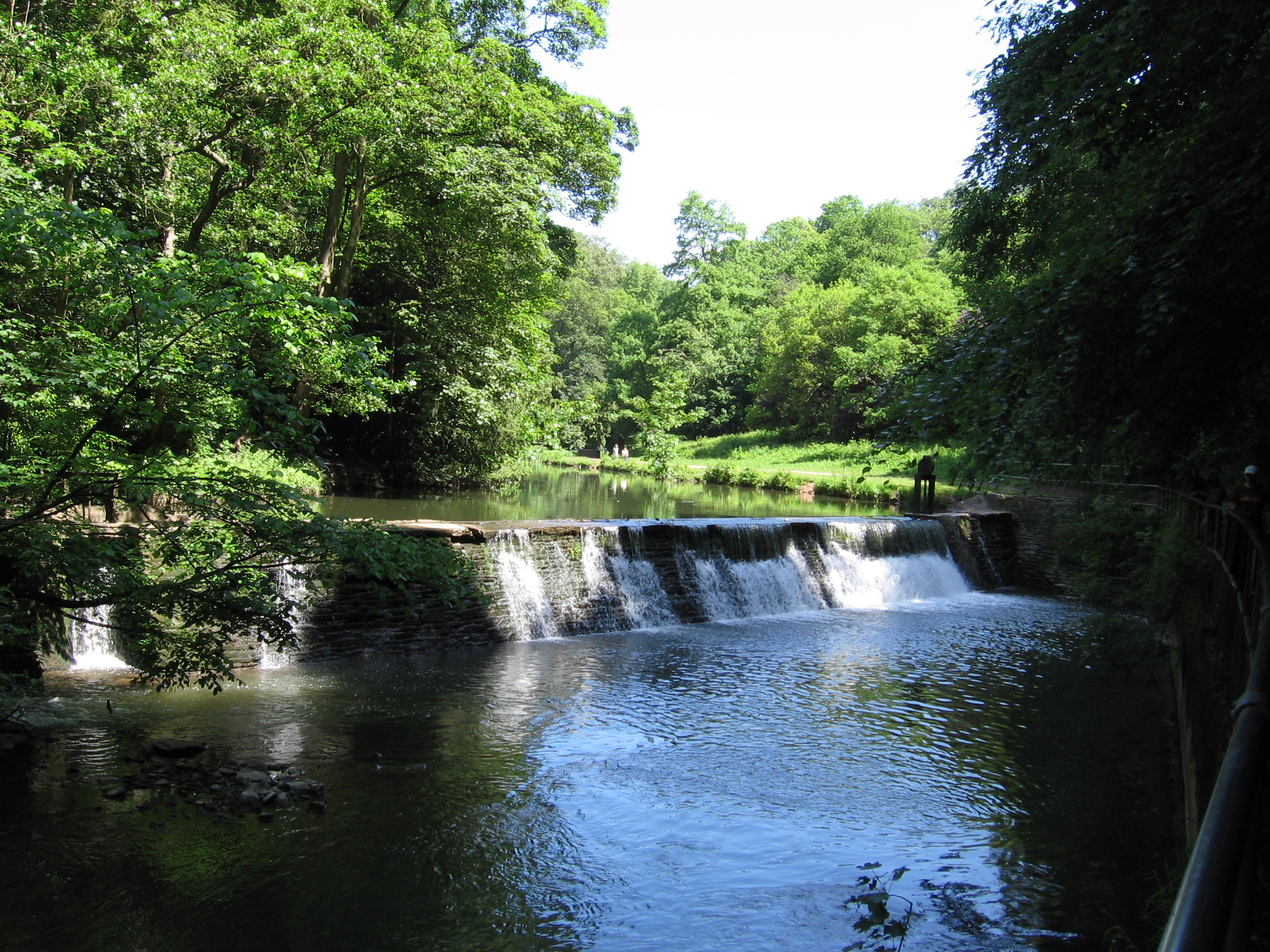
Part of the Frome Valley Walkway: a weir with sluice gates on the River Frome at Oldbury Court

Where it passes through Bristol the river was prone to flooding, but the Northern Stormwater Interceptor, running from Eastville Sluices to the River Avon downstream of Clifton Suspension Bridge, has since been constructed to control this. At Wade Street, St Judes, the river enters an underground culvert, emerging at what Bristolians call The Centre (formerly the 'Tramways Centre'), but only when there is a risk of flooding. The river is otherwise channelled through Mylne's Culvert into the River Avon at a point between Bathurst Basin and Gaol Ferry Bridge. Three further flood relief tunnels- Castle Ditch, Fosseway and Castle Green Tunnel - run under Castle Park in central Bristol to carry excess flows into the Floating Harbour.

Major floods have included Mina Road, St Werburghs and Wellington Road in October 1882; Eastville, St Werburghs and Broadmead in 1936 and 1937; Eastville Park and nearby due to melting snow in 1947; 1968 Bristol Rovers F.C. old ground at Eastville. The Broadmead area still remains at risk of flooding in severe weather conditions.

In December 2011, a kayaker was killed after capsizing in the flooded river at Snuff Mills weir in Frenchay during a night-time paddle.

== Frome Valley Walkway ==
The Frome Valley Walkway is a public footpath, 18 miles (29 km) long, that runs almost the entire length of the river from Old Sodbury to Bristol. A guide pamphlet has been published. The walkway was created by a partnership between local authorities, the Environment Agency, wildlife organisations and location action groups, including Avon Biodiversity Partnership, Avon Invasive Weeds Forum, Avon Wildlife Trust, Bristol City Council, Bristol Naturalists' Society and South Gloucestershire Council. Regular events include clearing of invasive species and guided walks.

== Natural history ==
The Frome valley supports a range of wildlife and plants, passing through or near to a number of nature reserves and parks, including Goose Green fields, Chill Wood, Cleeve Valley, Oldbury Court park and Eastville Park. Notable species include grey wagtails, wild service trees, dippers and several species of bats. One of the last British populations of the endangered native white-clawed crayfish in the Bristol area was found in the river, but became extinct in 2008.

== See also ==
- Other Rivers Frome

== Works cited ==
- Watson, Sally (1991). Secret Underground Bristol. Bristol: The Bristol Junior Chamber. ISBN 0-907145-01-9.
