= Stapleton, Bristol =

Area of Bristol, England

Coordinates: 51.4804°N 2.5552°W

Stapleton
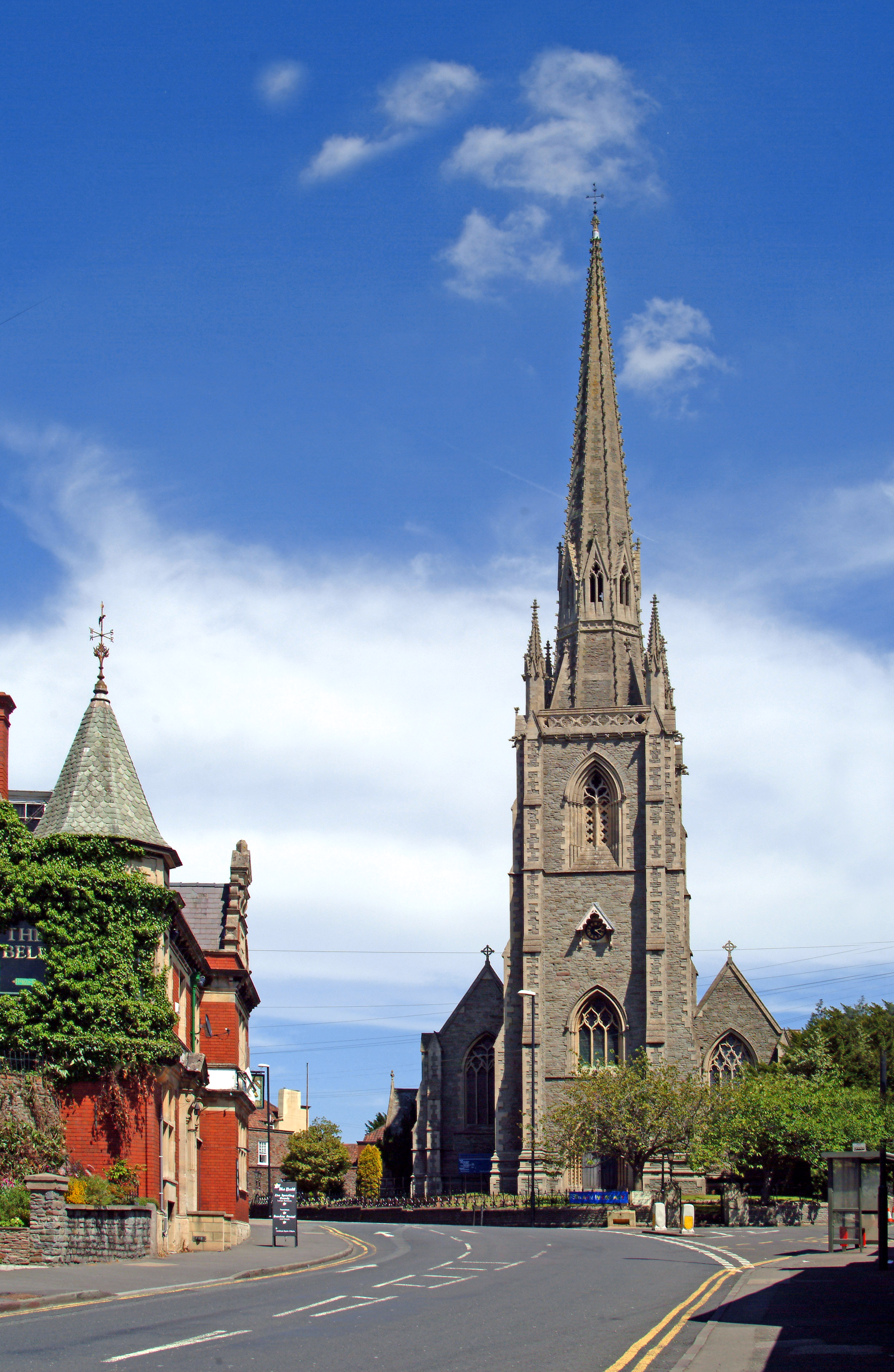
- Bell Hill and the spire of Church of Holy Trinity

- Location within Bristol
- OS grid reference: ST615758
- Unitary authority: Bristol
- Ceremonial county: Bristol
- Region: South West
- Country: England
- Sovereign state: United Kingdom
- Post town: Bristol
- Postcode district: BS16
- Dialling code: 0117
- Police: Avon and Somerset
- Fire: Avon
- Ambulance: South Western
- UK Parliament: Bristol North East

Stapleton is an area in the northeastern suburbs of the city of Bristol, England. The name is colloquially used today to describe the ribbon village along Bell Hill and Park Road in the Frome Valley. It borders Eastville to the south and Begbrook and Frenchay to the north. Its housing stock consists of a mixture of Victorian, Edwardian, inter-war and late 20th-century properties.

It is a popular residential area on three counts. It is convenient for the M32 motorway (with rapid access to the M4 and M5), it is a semi-rural area within two miles of central Bristol, and it boasts a popular public school.

Stapleton's church is a prominent Bristol landmark, visible from the M32 motorway.

== History ==
The name is from the Old English word "stapol" meaning "post," and "ton" meaning "settlement." The antiquary John Weever, quoting the 16th-century Tuscan merchant Lodovico Guicciardini, defined a staple town "to be a place to which, by the prince's authority and privilege, wool, hides of beasts, wine, corn or grain, and other exotic or foreign merchandize are transferred, carried, or conveyed to be sold". In European historiography, the term "staple" refers to the entire medieval system of trade and its taxation. Under this system, the government or the ruler required that all overseas trade in certain goods be transacted at specific designated market "staple towns" or ports, referred to as the "staple ports".

The ancient parish of Stapleton covered Fishponds and Eastville and was originally within Kingswood Forest. The Saxon hamlet of Stapleton, first documented in 1208, stood at the edge of the forest, just north of the River Frome. Finds of Roman coins point to even earlier habitation. Even in the 18th century, it was still heavily wooded.

The hamlet was donated to Tewkesbury Abbey in 1174 by William Fitz Robert, 2nd Earl of Gloucester. By the late 16th century, it was the property of the Berkeley family of Stoke Gifford, and was passed down to the Duke of Beaufort who retained the estate until the early 20th century, selling it in 1917.

Stapleton was enclosed in 1781, Stapleton Common being sold as 9 lots, mostly to the Duke of Beaufort. Stapleton, then in Gloucestershire, became a civil parish in 1866, but on 1 April 1898 the parish was abolished and merged with Bristol. In 1891 the parish had a population of 14,589. From 1894 to 1898 Stapleton was an urban district of which contained the parish.

=== Mining ===
Coal was mined in the area, there being some 70 pits by 1700, and vast numbers of local men were employed throughout the 18th century. In the 1890s, the mines produced a thousand tons per day.

== Famous people ==
Frances Milton, the mother of Anthony Trollope was born in the village in 1780, and Sarah Young, the mother of Thomas Chatterton was also born there. The Indian social reformer Ram Mohan Roy died at Beech House, the home of Lant Carpenter, nursed by his daughter Mary in 1833. Roy had paid a brief visit to the House.

== Sport ==
In 1863 a cricket club was formed, its most famous player being W. G. Grace who played for Gloucestershire County Cricket Club and the English cricket team. At Purdown a football team called the Black Arabs were to become Bristol Rovers.

== Transport ==
Also in the 19th century, two lines of the Great Western Railway were built through the area, meeting at Stapleton Road railway station which was opened on 8 September 1863. Tramways were also built, horse drawn at first, but then electric – they reached Fishponds in 1897. The village of Stapleton lies along the B4058 road but is now bypassed by the M32 motorway that runs to the West and North of the village. Junction 2 of this motorway is just south of the village and provides convenient access to the M4 and M5 motorways, respectively four and seven kilometres from the junction. This has helped provide rapid access to Cardiff and Newport in South Wales, the M4 Corridor towards London and the Birmingham area.

In 2022, the number 5 bus was withdrawn and replaced with the 47, which bypassed the area, and the Y4 bus was withdrawn. The area now has no bus service.

== Buildings ==
=== Stapleton Church ===
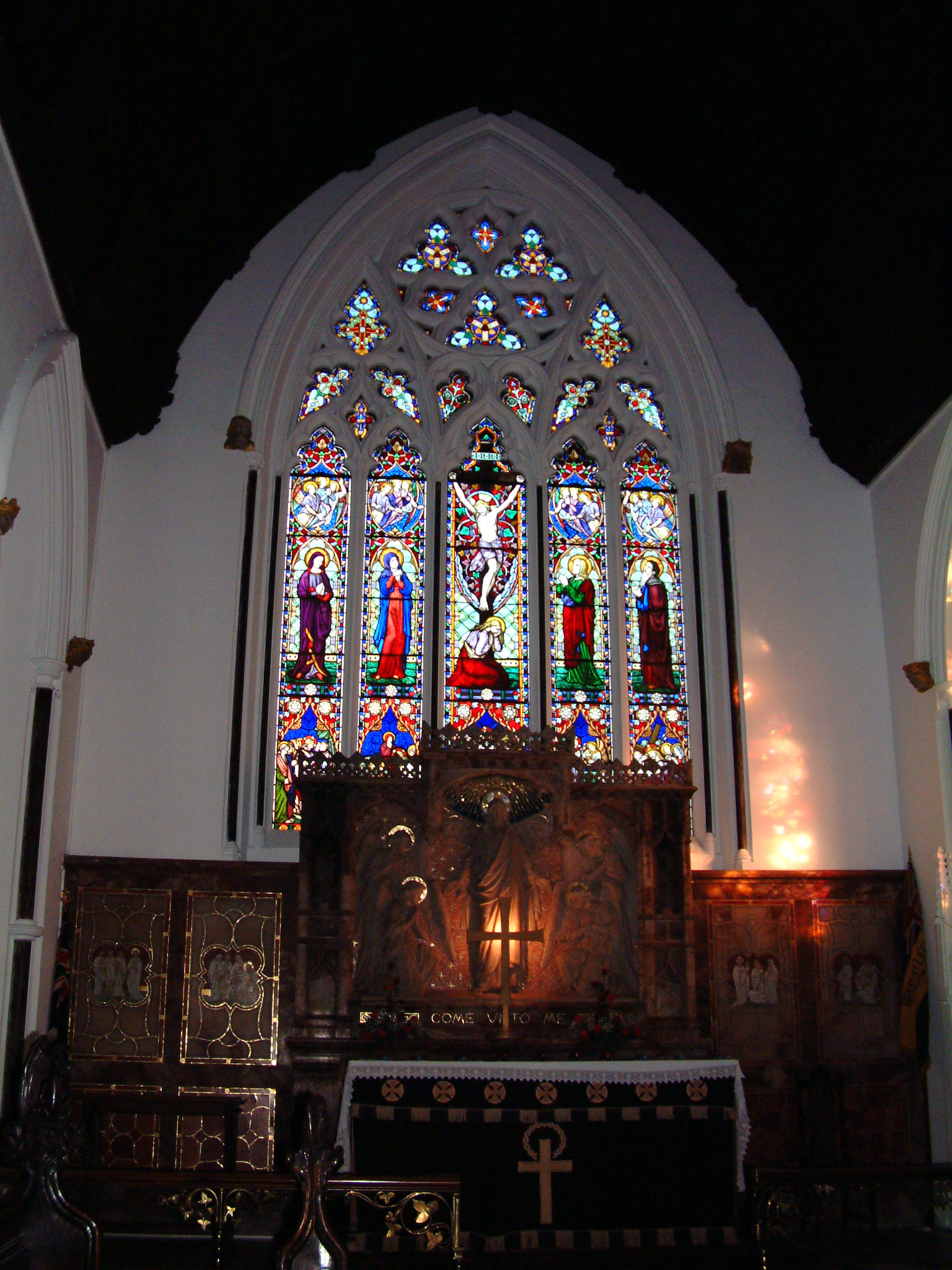
Altar and stained glass window, Holy Trinity, Stapleton

There has been a Church on this site for at least 500 years. The original dedication was to St. Giles, but between 1691 and 1720 the old Church was demolished and a new one, dedicated to the Holy Trinity, erected in its place. In 1854 the Bishop of Gloucester and Bristol, Bishop Monk, whose official residence was what is now Collegiate School, offered to rebuild the Church at his own cost, desiring “my fellow parishioners to understand that my motives in this work are to remove the source of dispute and contention for pews, caused by the inadequate size of the Church, and to provide sittings for the poor as well as other classes of Parishioners”. The Chancel was rebuilt at the cost of the lay rector, Greville Smyth, and the new Church was dedicated on 15 April 1857. The Choir Vestry was added in 1892.

At first the Church was the responsibility of the Benedictine monks of the Priory of St. James, who appointed chaplains. The first Vicar was instituted in 1540, after the dissolution of the monasteries. In 1544 St. James’ Priory with all its assets, including the rectory and tithes of St. Giles’ Church, was sold to Henry Brayne, a merchant tailor of London. In 1626 the Heath House estate, with the rectory and tithes, was bought by Thomas Walter, from whom they descended to the Smyth family of Ashton Court, as described in the tablet over the North Door. The lay rectory and tithes were surrendered by Greville Smyth in 1857, when the Vicar became the Rector, but the right of presentation to the benefice was retained by the family until 1948, when it was transferred to the Bishop of Bristol.

The Church is a fine example of Victorian Gothic architecture in the Decorated style. It was built of Pennant stone quarried locally at Broom Hill and the stone for the dressings came from quarries near Bath. The Tower with its spire is a commanding feature rising to a height of 170 feet. Coupled buttresses at its angles rise boldly in five stages to the rich parapet and are capped with crocketted pinnacles. These flank the spire whose eight angles are ornamented with crockets carved in Bath stone bands, the general facing being of Pennant stone in courses. A large metal cross surmounts the finial of the spire. At the foot of the Tower is the elaborately carved West Doorway.

The springing of the arches, the roof-corbels and window heads are enriched by fine carvings of heads, angels with musical instruments, and foliage. The whole of the roof is of oak, that in the chancel being ribbed and carved.

The font dates from 1857 and is of alabaster set on marble pillars. The oak cover is a memorial to two members of the Hall family who fell in the First World War.

The pulpet seems to have been made for some other church where the steps would have wound round a pillar. The Caenstone body rests on serpentine shafts with foliated capitals. and three of the panels contain carved representations of preaching – Christ in the centre, and St Peter and St Paul on the left and right respectively.

A fine brass eagle lectern given in memory of Charles Castle, died 1886. The choir stalls are notable for the finely carved foliage and figures of kneeling angels. A reredos was given by the Revd. W. H. Shaw at the time of the Church's jubilee in 1907. It shows Our Lord holding out His hands in invitation while angels stand or kneel on either side.

The organ is a two-manual instrument by Vowles of Bristol. Built in 1873, it now has electro-pneumatic action with 21 speaking stops.

The Lady Chapel has an oak reredos and communion rail given in memory of Lt. Fitzroy Charles Phillpotts, who fell at Gallipoli in 1915.

No two windows have the same tracery. Starting at the West end, and proceeding clockwise, the subjects are as follows:

West. (Hardman) Bishop Monk kneels to offer a model of the Church to Christ on His throne. On the left, St. Peter; on the right, St. Paul.

North Aisle.1. The three lights show (a)The supper at Emmaus; (b) The women at the empty tomb on Easter morning; (c) Our Lord showing his wounds to doubting Thomas. (In memory of Charlotte Harriet Harford, died 1885). 2. (a) Simeon recognises the infant Jesus in the Temple; (b) Jesus blessing the children; (c) Jesus being taught to read by his mother, while His grandmother St Anne stands by. (In memory of Arthur John Smyth Osbourne, died 1881, aged 4). North Sanctuary The two lights show Joshua, Gideon, Caleb and David, with, above: (a) Gideon receiving his commission to destroy the Midianites; (b) David slaying Goliath; and below: (a) Joshua's vision of the captain of the Lord's host before Jericho; (b) Caleb smiting the sons of Anak. (In memory of Capt. Edward Gore Langton, of Stapleton Park (now Beech House), died 1860, a veteran of the Peninsula and Waterloo).

East Window The five principal lights show the Crucifixion. The five smaller pictures below (partly hidden by the reredos) are: (a) Christ's entry into Jerusalem; (b)The raising of Lazarus; (c) The Last Supper; (d) Christ's agony in the Garden of Gethsemane; (e) Christ carrying His cross.

South Sanctuary (a) Jesus with Martha and Mary at Bethany; (b) The raising of Lazarus. (In memory of Frances Matilda Gore Langton, died 1864) South Chancel 1. (a) Mary Magdalene meets the risen Christ in the garden; (b) The good works of Dorcas. (In memory of Ann, widow of Capt Edward Gore Langton, died 1869). 2. (Kempe) The Annunciation. (In memory of Margaret Catherine Heberden, died 1887, aged 17).

Lady Chapel (East) The four lights show one picture of the Adoration of the Magi (Damaged by bomb blast in the Second World War; restored 1949)

South Aisle 1 (Kempe) (a) St. Margaret, a Roman virgin, beheaded rather than marry a heathen; (b) St. Catherine, a virgin of Egypt, tortured on a wheel and beheaded; (c) St. Agnes of Rome, also beheaded rather than marry a heathen. (In memory of Catherine Osbourne, died 1888) 2. (a) St. Giles, with his hand pierced by the arrow intended for his friend, the hind; (b) St. Augustine of Canterbury; (c) St. Lucy of Syracuse, beheaded for her faith. (In memory of Alfred William Beasley Brooks, died 1927, and of his wife, Lucy Anne, died 1908)

Over the North Door is a memorial to the Walter family erected by Mary Whitchurch, sole heiress of Rowles Walter, and mother of Jane Smyth. On the West wall of the North Aisle are tablets erected by Jane Smyth to her mother and aunt, and another to the Revd. Henry Shute (the elder), Domestic Chaplain to the Dowager Duchess of Beaufort. Other tablets from the second Church are now on the inside walls of the Tower

The church has a peal of six bells:

Treble : 1872 2 : Undated 3 : Originally 1669 (From the first Church) Recast 1990 by Taylor's of Loughborough 4 : 1792 (From the second Church) 5 :1792 (From the second Church) Tenor : 1845 (From the second Church)

The old square font in the West porch has been dated to about 1000. When the second church was demolished this font was sold to Bishop Monk's former butler, who kept the Bell Inn, where it was used as a geranium pot. It was discovered and returned to the church by the Revd. W. H. Shaw (Rector 1891–1908). The font, of Dundry stone, has an overflow channel in one corner; other marks show where the hinges and lock were fitted for the font-cover, necessary to prevent the superstitious use of the consecrated water.

1987: Gas central heating installed. Toilet adjoining Vestry. Access ramp by Vestry door with level approach and new opening to side of North Porch.

1993: Electric lighting, which had replaced gas in 1948, renewed. New floodlighting for spire.

=== Other Buildings ===
The church of St Thomas the Apostle in Eastville was consecrated in 1889 but is now a Pentecostal hall.

Stapleton is home to Collegiate School, a co-educational independent school; the school was previously named Colston's School after the 17th-century merchant, slave trader and philanthropist Edward Colston. The school moved to the village in 1861, taking over a site in the west of the village that had previously been the Bishop's Palace, and which has been designated by English Heritage as a grade II listed building. Originally called Stapleton house, it became the home of the Bishop of Bristol and Gloucester in 1840 after his previous residence was burnt down during the Reform Bill Riots.

Further North is the Masonic Hall, home to the Filton Chapter of Freemasons.

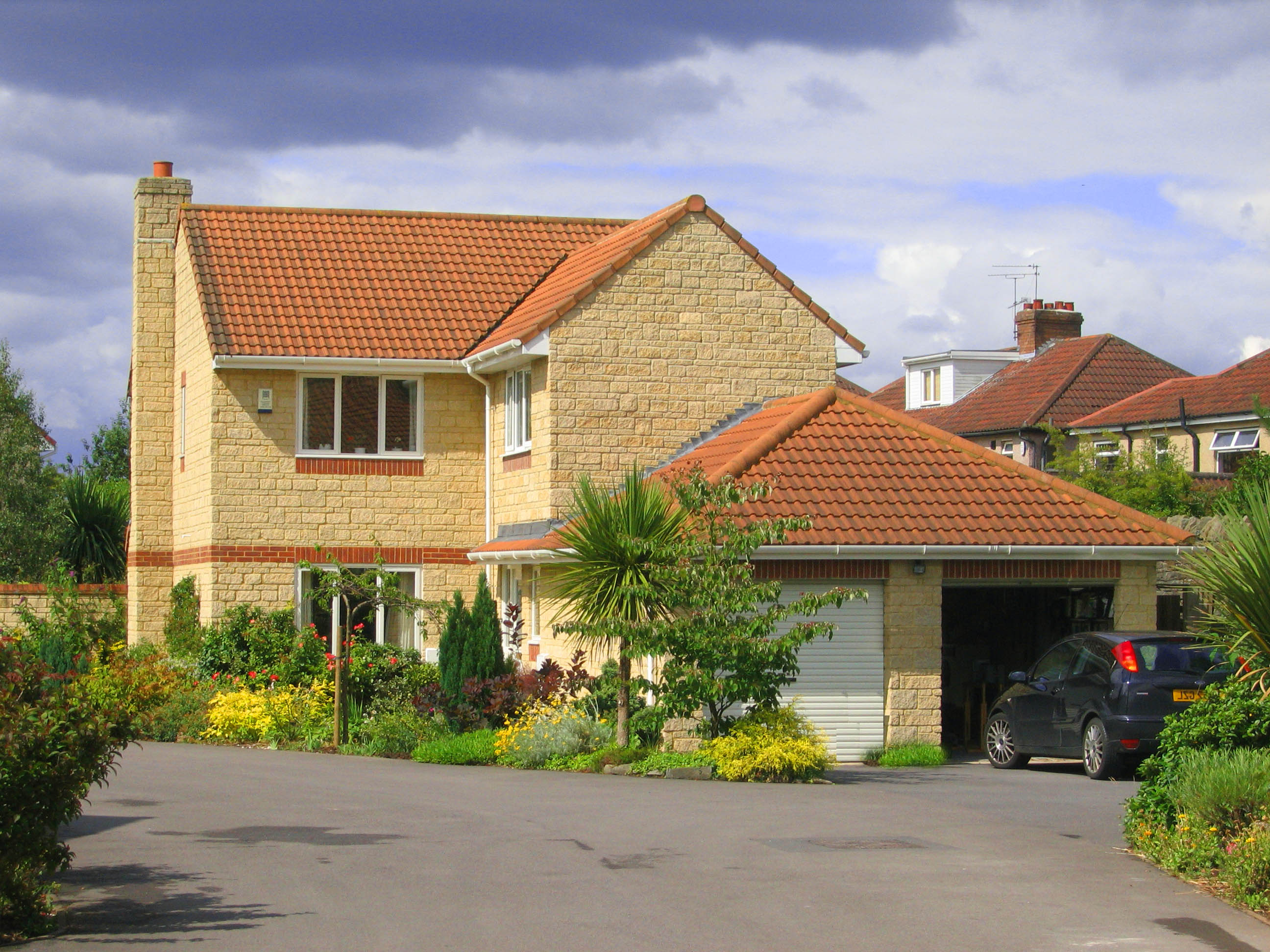
Typical Villa-style home on Glendale Grange.

In the mid-1990s a major development by the house builders Beazer Homes (now Persimmon plc) added over one hundred and fifty houses on the site of an old hospital between Bell Hill and the M32 motorway. These homes range from small two-bedroomed terraces to 4 and 5 bedroom villas. Also included was the refurbishment and development of Beech House (a former estate owner's home) into housing, and Linden House (a former farm house) into apartment accommodation. The development was known as Glendale Grange until incorporated into the village on its completion in 1999.

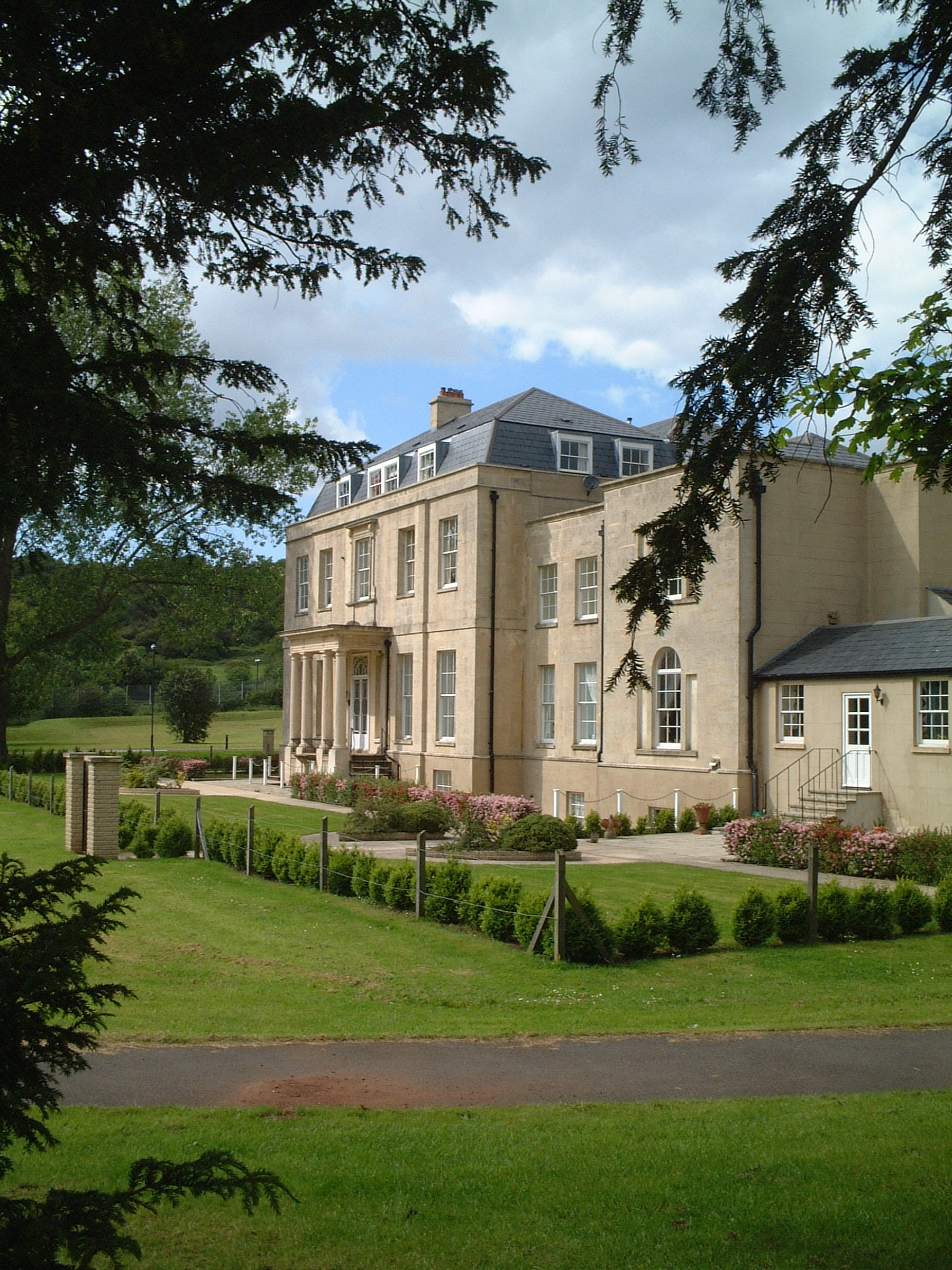
Southern aspect of Beech House.

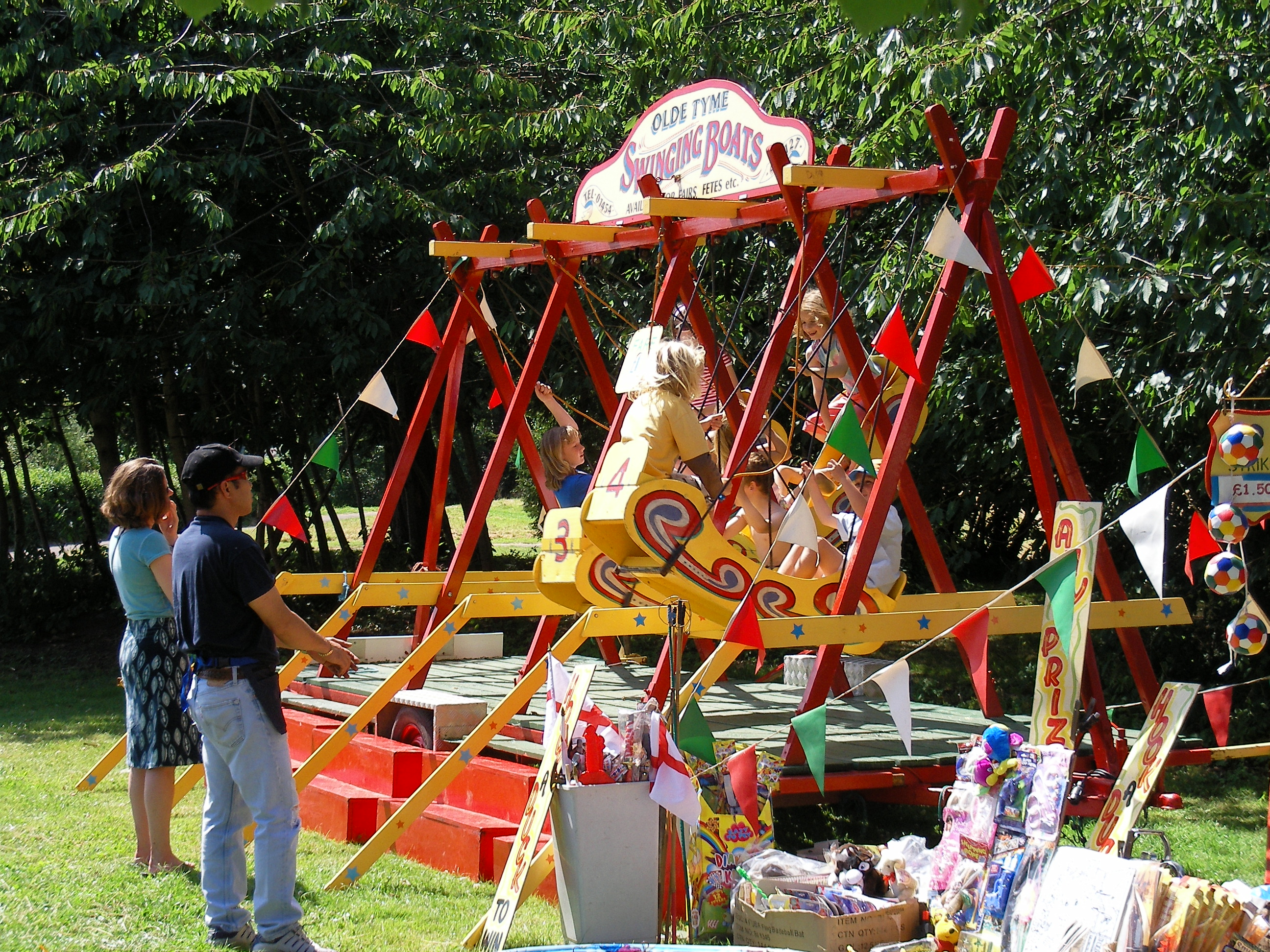
Fayre on Stapleton Village Green.

This development also gave the village a purpose-built and substantial village green bounded by Baileys Mead Road (one of the main roads in the new part of the village) to the North and East and Beech House to the South. This green features a fully enclosed play park for younger children. The green plays host to many village and community events including Summer Fayres and barbecues, Christmas carol concerts. It now compromises the hub of the village.

This part of the village is also home to New Friends Hall, a division of the North Bristol NHS Trust and also, across the motorway, Heath House Hospital, part of the Priory Group.

On the hilltop to the north of the Priory buildings (on Purdown) is the Purdown BT Tower. It is one of twelve reinforced concrete towers owned by BT in the UK. It is used mainly for point-to-point microwave links and forms part of the British Telecom microwave network. Although not open to the public, public footpaths lead, via a bridge over the M32 motorway to the lands around the tower.

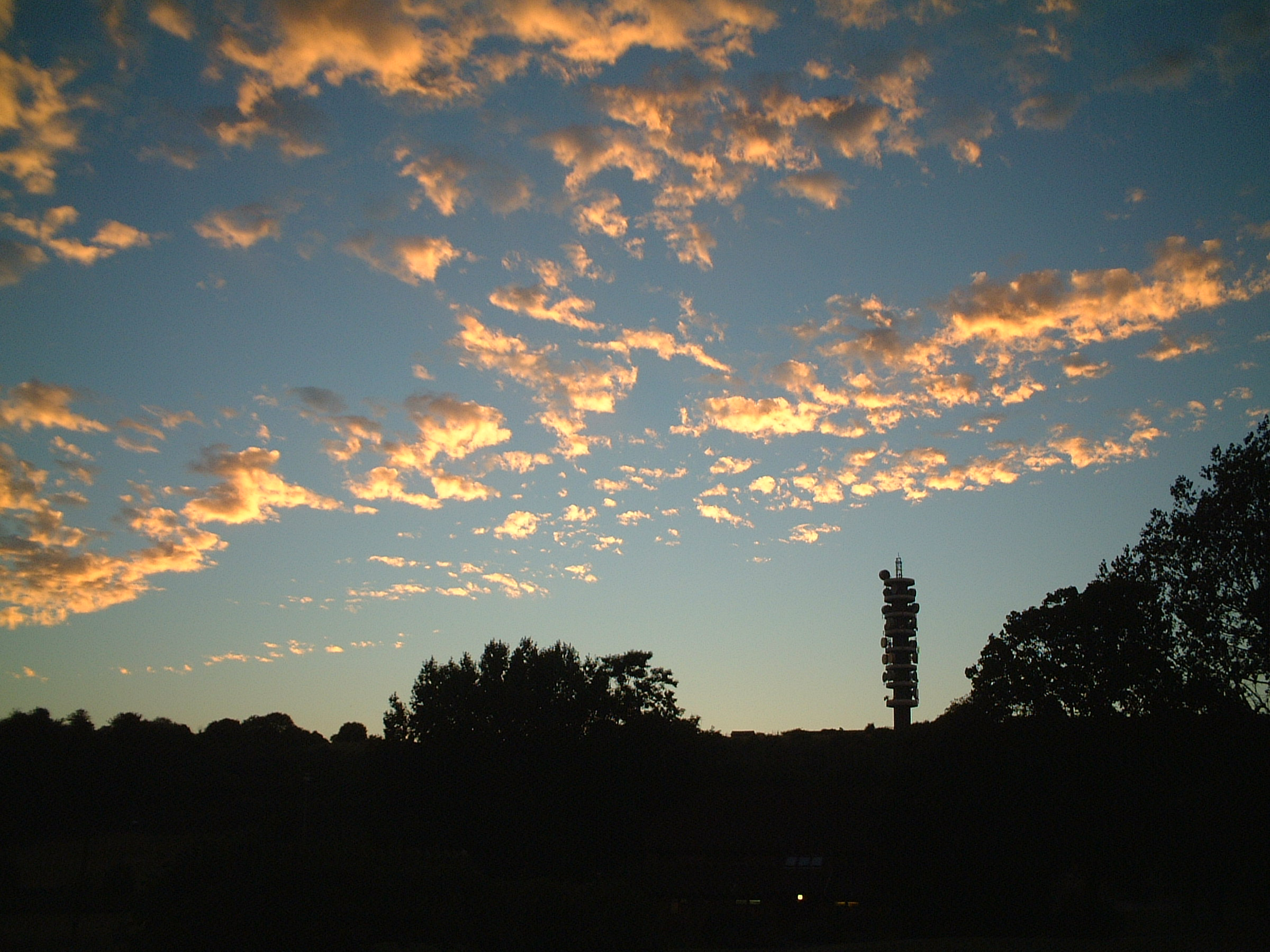
Purdown BT Tower, as seen from Linden House, Stapleton.

== Demography ==
In 2010 the village substantially comprises families who work locally or within the Greater Bristol area. Many of the working residents have technical positions within the University of the West of England, Ministry of Defence and Hewlett-Packard, whose campuses are all within five kilometres of the centre of the village. The combination of easy access to the city and its major employers and lower than average congestion levels makes Stapleton an increasingly desirable place to live, pushing up house prices.
