= List of places in Avon =

This is a list of settlements in the former ceremonial county of Avon, England. The administrative and ceremonial county of Avon was created in 1974 and abolished in 1996. See the list of places in England for places in other counties. The red links represent settlements that are awaiting an article.

== A ==
Abbots Leigh - Abson - Acton Turville - Aldwick - Almondsbury - Alveston - Arnos Vale - Ashley Down - Ashton Gate - Aust - Avonmouth

== B ==
Backwell - Badminton - Bannerdown - Banwell - Baptist Mills - Barrow Gurney - Barrs Court - Barton - Barton Hill - Bath - Bathampton - Batheaston - Bathford - Bathwick - Beach - Bedminster - Bedminster Down - Benter - Binegar - Bishop Sutton - Bishopston - Bishopsworth - Bitton - Blagdon - Bleadon - Bourton - Bradley Stoke - Brentry - Bridgeyate - Brislington - Bristol - Brockley - Burrington - Butcombe

== C ==
Cameley - Camerton - Chapel Allerton - Carlingcott - Charlcombe - Charmy Down - Charterhouse - Chelvey - Chelwood - Chew Magna - Chew Stoke - Chewton Keynsham - Chewton Mendip - Chilcompton - Chipping Sodbury - Chittening - Churchill - Clandown - Clapton - Clapton in Gordano - Claverham - Claverton - Claverton Down - Clay Hill - Cleeve - Clevedon - Clifton - Clifton Wood - Clutton - Coalpit Heath - Codrington - Coleford - Combe Down - Combe Hay - Compton Dando - Compton Martin - Congresbury - Conham - Coombe Dingle - Corston - Cotham - Cowhill

== D ==
Dodington - Downend - Doynton - Dundry - Dunkerton - Dunkirk - Durdham Park

== E ==
Earthcott Green - East Clevedon - East Harptree - East Hewish - East Rolstone - Easter Compton - Eastertown - Easton - Easton in Gordano - Eastville - Edford - Edingworth - Elberton - Elborough - Emborough - Emersons Green - Englishcombe

== F ==
Failand - Farleigh - Farleigh Hungerford - Farmborough - Farrington Gurney - Faulkland - Felton - Filton - Fishponds - Flax Bourton - Foxcote - Frampton Cotterell - Frenchay - Freshford

== G ==
Gaunts Earthcott - Greenbank - Grovesend - Gurney Slade

== H ==
Hallatrow - Hallen - Hambrook - Hamswell - Hanham - Hawkesbury - Hawkesbury Common - Hawkesbury Upton - Haydon - Hemington - Henbury - Henfield - Hengrove - Henleaze - Hewish - High Littleton - Hillesley - Hinton Blewett - Hinton Charterhouse - Holcombe - Horfield - Horton - Hotwells - Hunstrete - Hutton

== I ==
Inglesbatch - Inglestone Common - Ingst - Iron Acton - Itchington - Iwood

== K ==
Kelston - Kelston Mills - Kendleshire - Kenn - Kewstoke - Keynsham - Kilmersdon - Kingsdown - Kingston Bridge - Kingston Seymour - Kingswood - Kington - Knap - Knowle

== L ==
Langford - Langridge - Lansdown - Larkhall - Laverton - Lawrence Hill - Lawrence Weston - Leigh upon Mendip - Leigh Woods - Limpley Stoke - Little Badminton - Little Sodbury - Little Stoke - Littleton - Littleton-upon-Severn - Litton - Locking - Long Ashton - Longwell Green - Lower Claverham - Lower Failand - Lower Hamswell - Lower Hazel - Lower Hounsley - Lower Morton - Lower Shockerwick - Lower Vobster - Lower Weston - Lulsgate -

== M ==
Mangotsfield - Marksbury - Midford - Midsomer Norton - Milton - Monkton Combe - Montpelier

== N ==
Nailsea - Nailwell - Nempnett Thrubwell - New Cheltenham - Newton - Newton St Loe - North End - North Stoke - North Widcombe - Northend - Northville - Northwick - Norton Hawkfield - Norton Malreward - Norton St Philip - Nye

== O ==
Oakhill - Old Down - Old Sodbury - Oldbury Naite - Oldbury-on-Severn - Oldland - Oldland Common - Olveston - Over -

== P ==
Patchway - Paulton - Peasedown St John - Pensford - Petty France - Pill - Pilning - Portbury - Portishead - Priston - Publow - Pucklechurch - Pylle Hill

== Q ==
Queen Charlton

== R ==
Radstock - Rangeworthy - Redcliffe - Redfield - Redhill - Redland - Regil - Rickford - Rowberrow - Rudgeway

== S ==
Saltford - Sandford - Sea Mills - Severn Beach - Severn Bridge - Shipham - Shirehampton - Shortwood - Shoscombe - Sneyd Park - Snowhill - Soundwell - Southdown - Southmead - Southstoke - Southville - Speedwell - St Agnes - St Andrews - St Annes - St Annes Park - St Augustines - St Catherine - St George - St. Georges, North Somerset - St James, Bristol - St Judes, Bristol - St Pauls - St Philips - St Philips Marsh - St Werburghs - Stanton Drew - Stanton Prior - Stanton Wick - Staple Hill - Stapleton - Star - Stockwood - Stoke Bishop - Stoke Gifford - Stoke St Michael - Ston Easton - Stoney Littleton - Stratton-on-the-Fosse - Swainswick - Swineford

== T ==
Tadwick - Tellisford - Temple Cloud - Temple Meads - Thornbury - Tickenham - Timsbury - Tockington - Tormarton - Totterdown - Tunley - Twerton - Tyndall's Park - Tyntesfield

== U ==
Upper Shockerwick - Upper Stanton - Upper Strode - Upper Swainswick - Upper Vobster - Upton Cheyney

== W ==
Walton Bay - Walton in Gordano - Warleigh - Warmley - Way Wick - Wellow - West Harptree - West Hewish - West Hill - West Town - West Wick - Westbury Park - Westbury-on-Trym - Westerleigh - Weston - Weston in Gordano - Weston-super-Mare - Whitchurch - Whitehall - Whiteway - Wick, Somerset - Wick St Lawrence - Widcombe - Willsbridge - Wilmington - Winford - Winscombe - Winterbourne - Winterbourne Down - Withyditch - Woollard - Woolley - Woolverton - Worle - Worlebury - Wraxall - Wrington - Writhlington

== Y ==
Yate - Yatton
