= Collingham Gardens =

Garden square in Kensington and Chelsea, London

Coordinates: 51°29′30″N 0°11′16″W

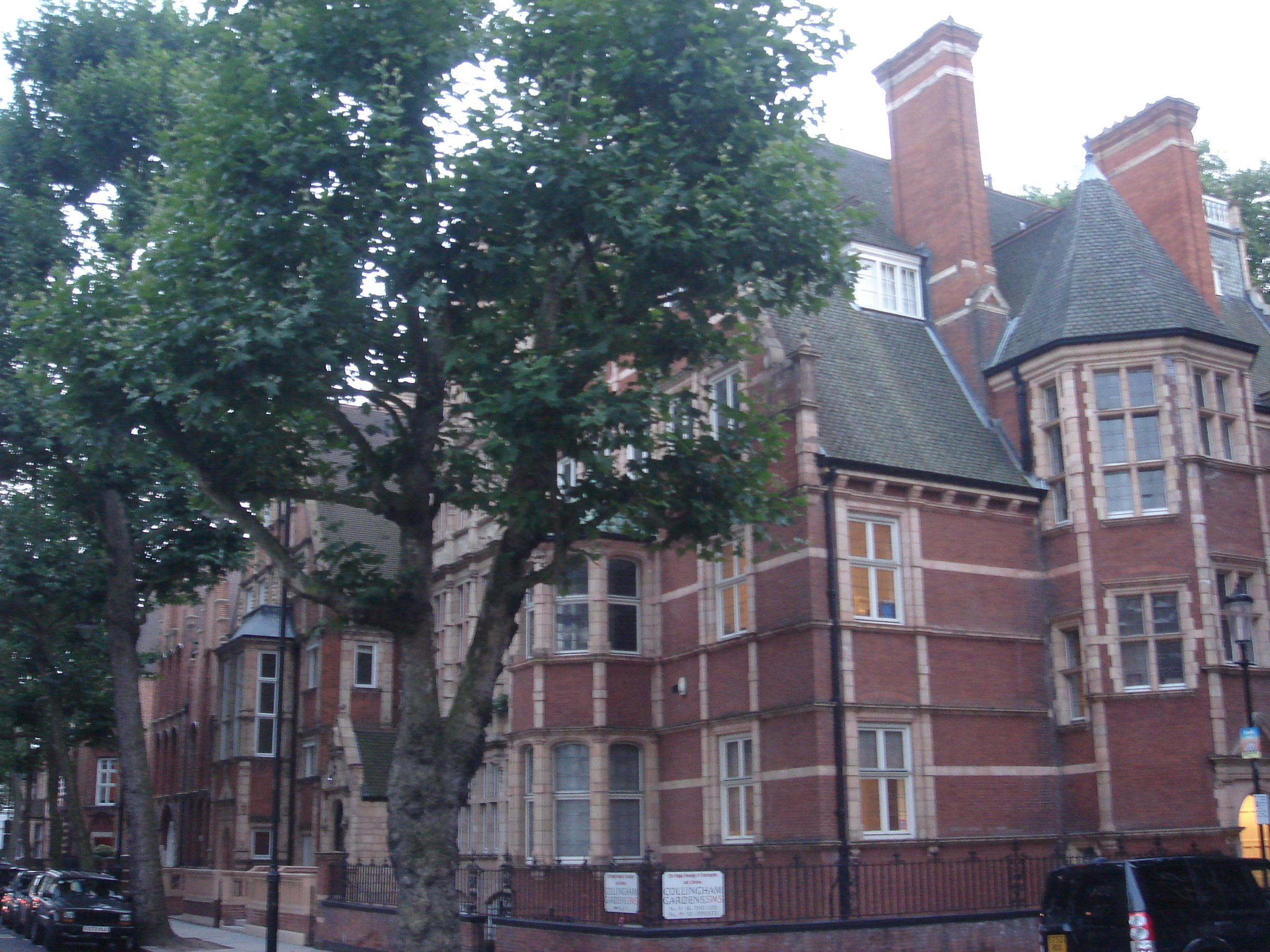
1–8 Collingham Gardens in 2013

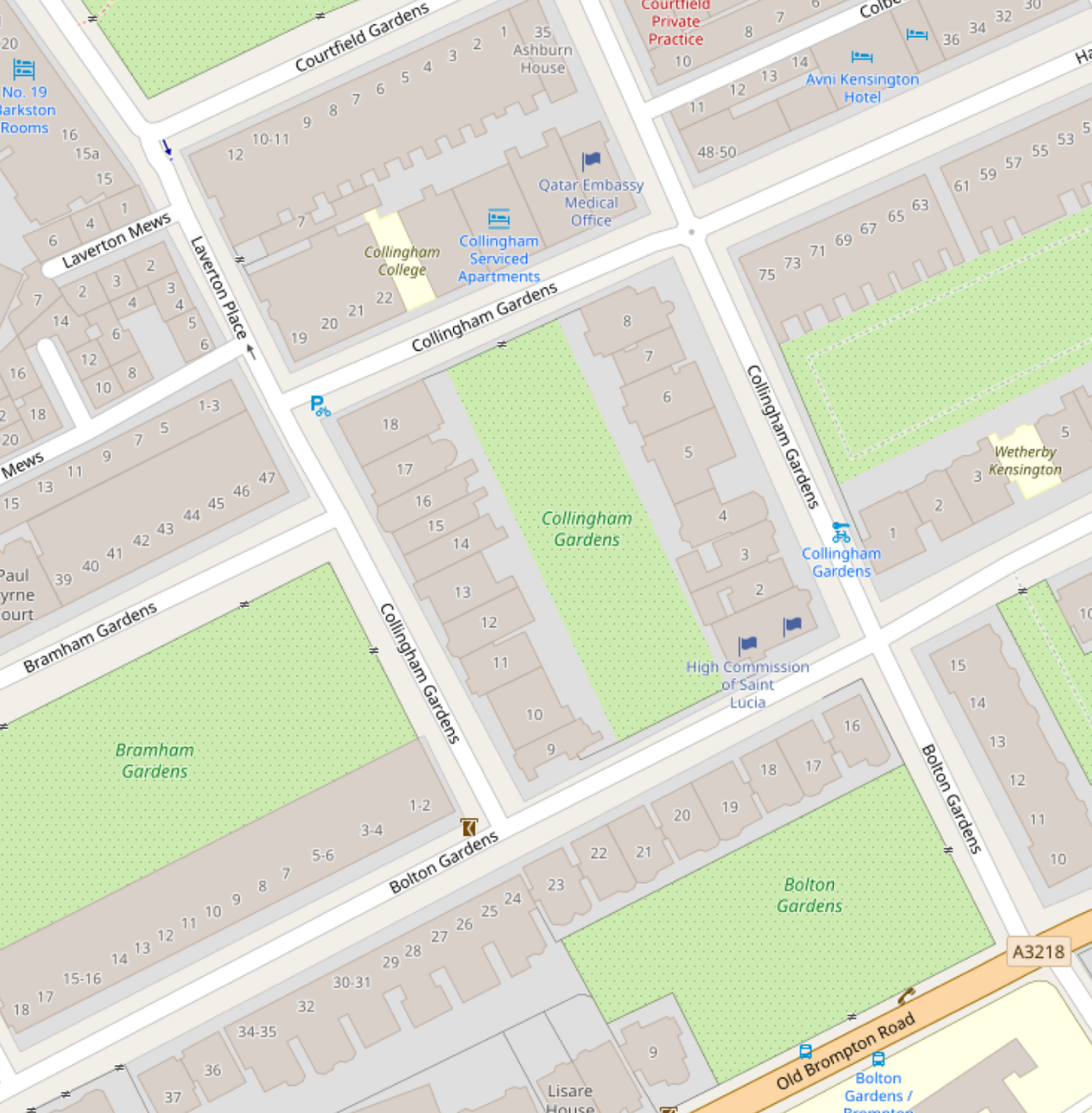
Collingham Gardens area map

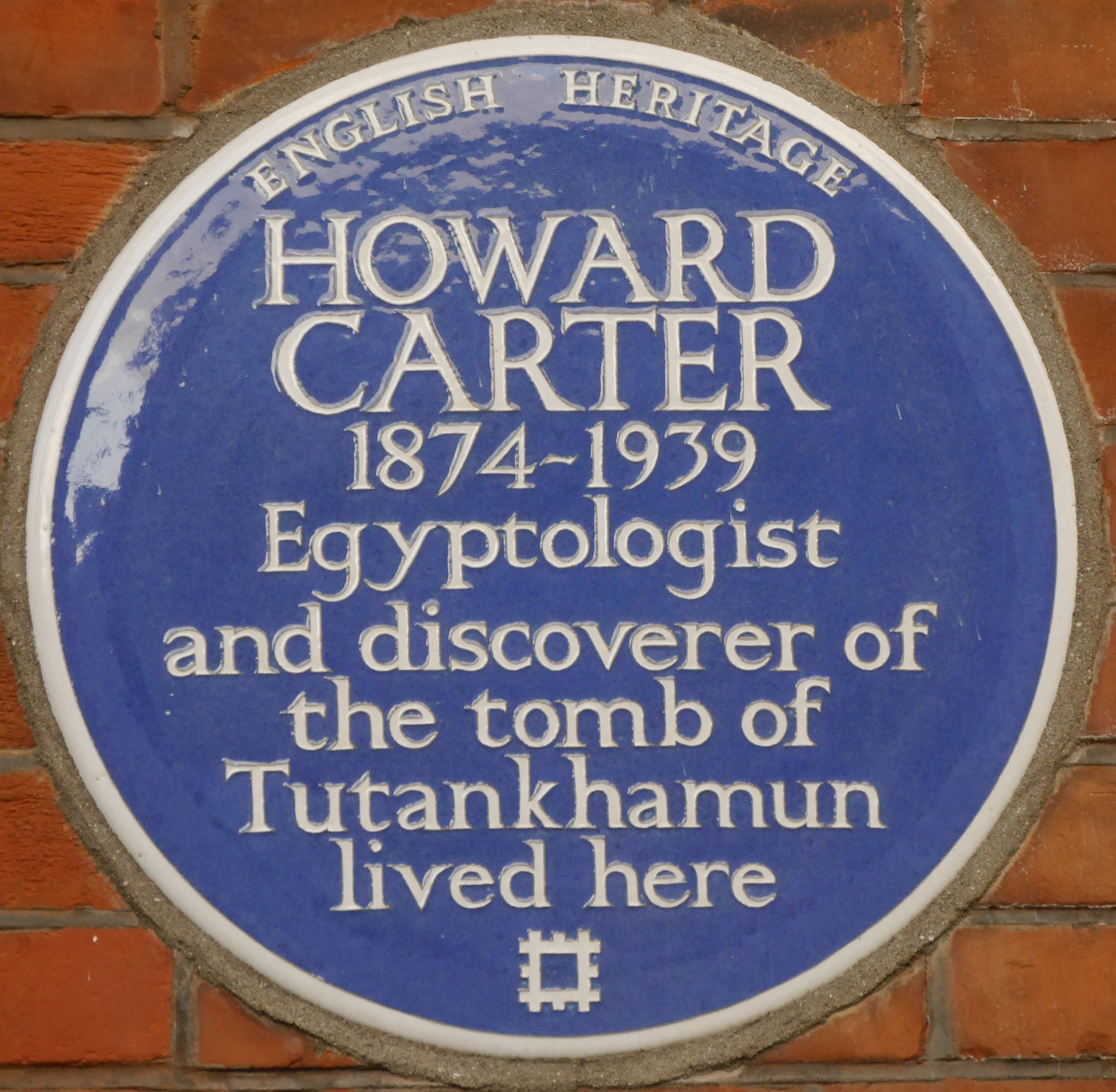
Blue plaque honouring Egyptologist Howard Carter, who lived at no 19

Collingham Gardens is a garden square in the Royal Borough of Kensington and Chelsea in London. Built between 1881 and 1888, the buildings on either side of the garden were designed by Ernest George and Peto, a firm that grafted Northern European urban motifs onto plainer Queen Anne style stock.

The street Collingham Gardens forms three sides of the quadrangle; the south side is part of the north side of Bolton Gardens. It intersects with Bramham Gardens, Harrington Gardens and Wetherby Gardens. The communal garden itself is only accessible to residents of the surrounding townhouses, but has been open to the general public during Open Garden Squares Weekend.

== Origins ==
Collingham Gardens was developed by Robert Gunter, soldier, property developer and politician, who with his wife had strong Yorkshire connections. It was named after Collingham, West Yorkshire, and is one of several streets in Earls Court and Chelsea developed at the same time which have names connected to the West Riding of Yorkshire. In 1888, the area around Collingham Gardens was considered part of South Kensington, with many wealthy and notable residents, such as dramatist W. S. Gilbert of the Gilbert and Sullivan duo, who lived nearby at 39 Harrington Gardens.

== Garden ==
The enclosed garden at Collingham Gardens was designed by Harold Peto, a landscape designer. Peto's original layout remains intact, incorporating wide lawns, curving gravel paths, and plane trees. The central circular lawn is framed by shrub beds, each featuring a Japanese cherry tree which blossoms in spring. The ornamental entrance gate is the original, but the railings are modern. The garden is protected under the 1851 London Squares Act.

== Buildings and residents ==
1–8 Collingham Gardens are all Grade II* listed, and were designed by Ernest George in 1881–84. The High Commission of Saint Lucia is at no 1, as is the High Commission of Dominica, in a building that was the West Indian Students' Centre from 1955. At no 3 In the late 1950s, Africa Unity House was set up, funded by the government of newly independent Ghana, to serve as a base for African student organisations in the UK, as well as providing office space for liberation movements such as the African National Congress.

No 19 was home to Howard Carter (1874–1939), the British archaeologist and Egyptologist who discovered the tomb of Tutankhamun. In 1999, English Heritage placed a blue plaque on the Victorian house where Carter once lived. Howard Carter gave his London address as 19b Collingham Gardens for most of the 1920s, and was likely renting part of his brother Samuel's home as a summer pied-à-terre. Samuel had previously lived at 10b Collingham Gardens.

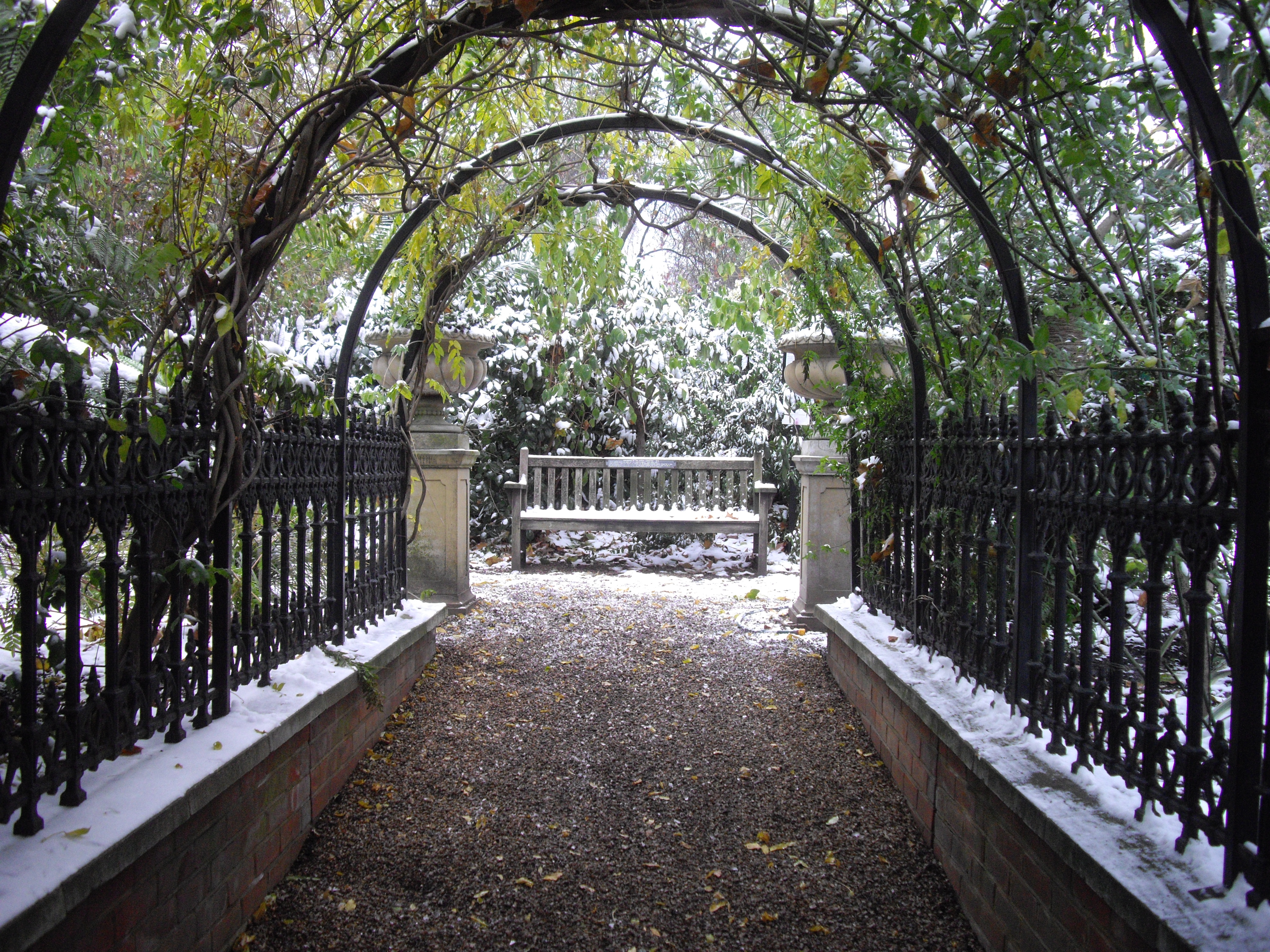
Bench at entrance to Collingham Gardens

No 23 is the sixth-form building for the private school Collingham College.

No 24 was home to Frederick Clifford (1828–1904), journalist, barrister and legal writer, who died there.

No 30 is a large five story end of block property. It was home to Kenneth Gandar-Dower, the author, sportsman and adventurer. He lived here with his family after their father died in 1919.. The property was sold after Gandar-Dower's death in 1944. Later it became part of the Embassy of Qatar, London. It was once the main site of the embassy, but was converted into a medical centre in the 1970s when it moved to better premises.

== In popular culture ==
When reggae musician Bob Marley was arrested for cannabis possession in 1977, the address he gave to police was Collingham Gardens, Kensington. In 2016, English Heritage opened a "cold case review" concluding that Marley had given the address to keep police away from his actual home in Oakley Street.
