= Bristol Christian Fellowship =

Bristol Christian Fellowship (BCF) is a network of churches, located in the Bristol region in the U.K. It is a non-denominational church. There are currently three churches which make up the network: Resound in North East Bristol; Thornbury in North of Bristol; and Aardvark located in central Bristol. It is part of the Evangelical Alliance and the Pioneer Network.

== History ==
Bristol Christian Fellowship first began in the 1960s, with a group of Christians looking for another way to experience church.

In the late 1960s, it grew out of the 'charismatic and house church movement. It emerged in a natural way, through various people encountering God in new ways and seeking an honest and authentic form of Christian community. Two groups, which initially met in houses in Olveston and Patchway, merged to form what became BCF.

During the Last 4 decades, the Church have made many changes in its shapes and meetings. The church maintained its presence in the north of Bristol and in Thornbury, with other churches joining along the way. In recent years BCF had been meeting as one group in east Bristol, but in 2009, there was a significant change that were made to the structure of the church. It was at this point that BCF started meeting as the three different expressions of Resound, Thornbury and Aardvark. These three groups have formed separate churches, thus, making the former 1 church system, a church network. all 3 districts of the church comes under the 'umbrella churches' of Bristol Christian Fellowship.

== Leadership ==
Although the BCF Network functions as a single charitable trust church, leadership is primarily located a local level within each church.

Previous leaders includes: Dave Day, Neil Edbrooke, Steve Hepden, Nic Harding, Lloyd Pietersen

Bible Christian Fellowship had its own school built in 1984 until it was demolished in 1992, it was named as Oakhill, in which it was run by BCF members.
