= Olveston (house) =

Historic home and museum in New Zealand

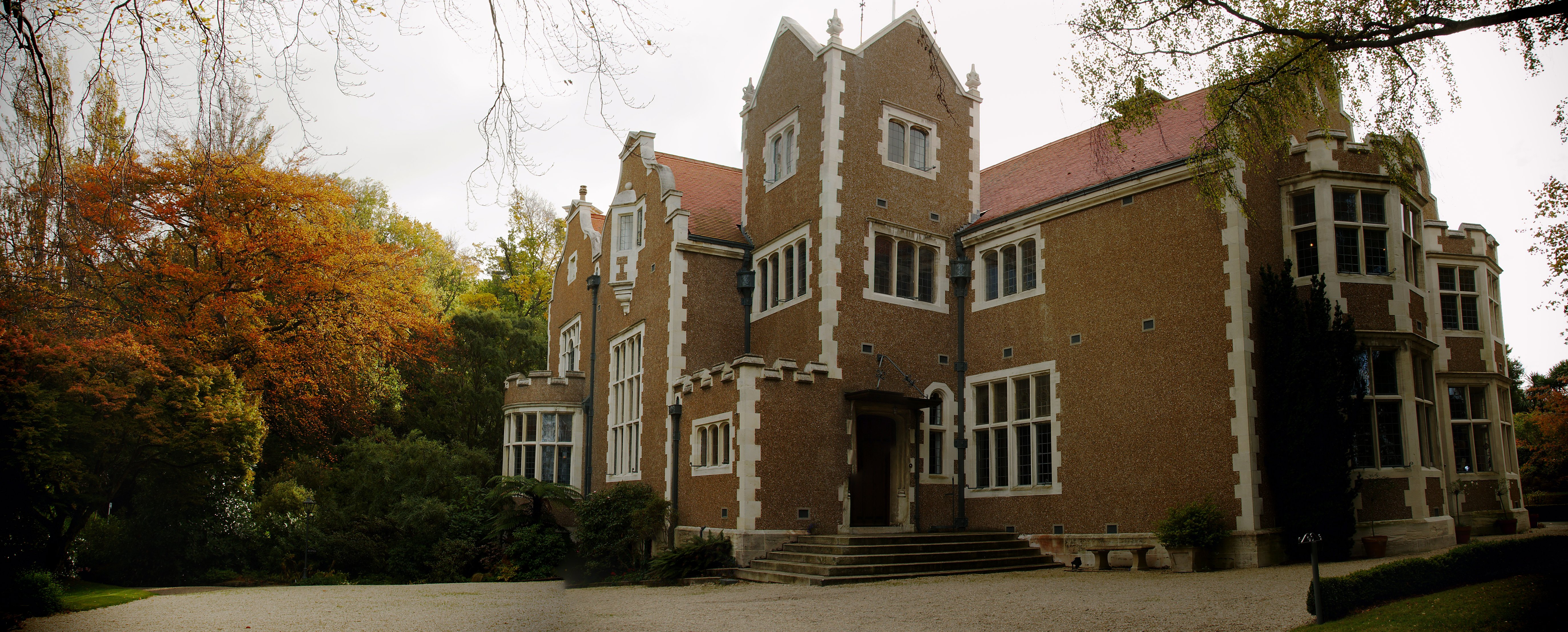
- Interactive map of the Olveston area
- Alternative names: Olveston Historic Home

General information
- Architectural style: Jacobean style
- Location: Dunedin, New Zealand, 42 Royal Terrace, North Dunedin, New Zealand
- Coordinates: 45.86613°S 170.50243°E
- Construction started: 1904
- Completed: 1907
- Owner: David Theomin (to 1933), Dorothy Theomin (to 1966), Dunedin City Council

Technical details
- Floor count: 4
- Floor area: 1276 m2
- Grounds: 1 acre

Design and construction
- Architect: Sir Ernest George
- Architecture firm: Mason & Wales
- Other designers: Green & Abbott (London; interior design)
- Main contractor: Robert Miekle

Other information
- Number of rooms: 35

Website
- olveston.co.nz

Heritage New Zealand – Category 1
- Designated: 24 November 1983
- Reference no.: 61

Olveston Historic Home is a substantial house and museum in an inner suburb of Dunedin, New Zealand. The house was designed by Ernest George in the Jacobean style in the early 20th century for the Theomin family. When Dorothy Theomin died in 1966, the house, garden and contents were gifted to the city, and are now open to the public. The house is decorated and furnished much as it was when the family lived there, creating a snapshot of upperclass colonial Edwardian life. The Theomins were avid collectors and their art, furniture, weapons and decorative items can be seen throughout the house.

Architectural historian Nikolaus Pevsner described Olveston as "an extremely interesting and very grand house", while Heritage New Zealand, who have protected it with a Category I registration, regard it as "an outstanding illustration of Jacobean design and one of New Zealand's grandest urban houses". In 2014 it won the TripAdvisor Choice Attraction award, making it the number one tourist destination in New Zealand. The gardens are of national significance. The property is part of the city's Royal Terrace-Pitt Street-Heriot Row Residential Heritage Precinct.

== History ==
=== David Theomin ===
Olveston was built between 1904 and 1907 for wealthy merchant David Theomin. He was born in Bristol, England, and emigrated to Melbourne, Australia in 1874. Theomin married Marie Michaelis of Melbourne (1855–1926) in Melbourne in January 1879. In 1881 Theomin and his wife moved to Dunedin. By marriage Theomin was related to the extended Hallenstein, Fels, de Beer and Brasch families of Dunedin, patrons of the arts and learning. Theomin's fortune came substantially from importing pianos, which he distributed through a New Zealand-wide chain of shops, called The Dresden, and later The Bristol Piano Company. He and his daughter Dorothy were patrons especially of music and the visual arts, while his wife Marie was a strong supporter of the now Plunket Society.

Theomin had acquired land on the site on Royal Terrace in 1881 where there was an existing eight-room villa, which the family called Olveston after the village near Bristol where David Theomin had enjoyed childhood holidays. By 1901 he had bought an adjacent property and in 1904 acquired another, allowing him to plan the building of a new house and garden in earnest.

From early 1902 to December 1904 David and Marie Theomin were travelling and collecting abroad, while Dorothy attended Roedean School. They visited Toronto and David Theomin had plans for a two-storey house drawn up by architect Charles J. Gibson (1862–1935). The house would have been a "fashionable two storey house with large bays set at right angles to a semicircular veranda that scaled the full height of the building." It was designed in red brick with contrasting stone facings, a veranda and Marseille tile roof. It would have been similar in appearance to Venard, a house designed by James Louis Salmond and built in 1898 in Mornington. However Theomin rejected Gibson's plans, and, continuing on to Europe, commissioned Ernest George & Yeates to design his new house, the plans of which are dated October 1903.

The Theomin family lived in the existing villa until construction began, when they rented it out and moved in to Avenal, the Hart residence at 25 Royal Terrace. Construction on the current house may have begun in 1904, the date inscribed on Olveston's south face, but probably was not well underway until the building permit was issued in early 1905. The major building work was completed the following year, but finishing work in the interior continued into 1907, and the family probably did not move in until July of that year. In August 1907 a dinner party and a coming-out ball for Dorothy were held. The original villa was demolished to make way for the gardens.

The size of the house required a team of servants, and Olveston was run by a live-in team of cook, parlour maid, housemaid, lady companion, and butler. Additional help included a gardener, laundress, dressmaker, and later a chauffeur, who resided in the house next door.

The Theomins regularly hosted 'at homes', daytime gatherings where up to 200 people might attend, at which there was always musical entertainment. Smaller afternoon teas were held in the drawing room to introduce or farewell friends, and dinner and bridge parties also, with attendees drawn from the church leaders, doctors, lawyers, university staff and business people of Dunedin. Marie and Dorothy Theomin often sang, but often invited performers, including the Cherniavsky Trio, and Mischa Levitsky. Truby King was known to be an eccentric dinner guest who would leave the table if he found the conversation tedious.

Marie Theomin died aged 71 in 1926, and Dorothy's older brother Edward died of lethargic encephalitis in 1928, having never properly recovered his health after the war. Edward had married Ethel Mocatta in 1919 and they moved into 8 Royal Terrace together. Dorothy and her father continued in the tradition of entertaining, hosting the English cricket team in 1930 and a Michaelis family wedding in 1931.

=== Dorothy Theomin ===
The house passed into Dorothy's ownership on David's death at Olveston on 15 July 1933. Dorothy admitted to friends that she relied on trustees and her lawyer and father's associates to manage financial matters. As neither Edward nor Dorothy had children, Dorothy found herself the sole remaining Theomin family member. She had an English companion, Mary Elliot, to help with running of the home, however staff became more difficult to retain after the outbreak of World War II and eventually Dorothy found herself living alone in the house, Mary Elliot having returned to England with Lady Newall in 1945. Dorothy invited friends from the Otago Hunt Club to join her in the house, and Stan and Stella McKay moved in with their two sons. Stan occasionally chauffeured Dorothy to the Hermitage or Franz Josef for mountaineering. A downstairs bathroom was converted to a kitchen for the McKay's use, and a guest bedroom became their living room.

Dorothy changed little in the house during her ownership. She relocated to the main bedroom and dressing room, which she had recarpeted in wall-to-wall fawn from Harvey Nichols, and she redecorated her private sitting room.

=== Dunedin City Council ===
The house and its contents were bequeathed to the city by Dorothy Theomin in 1966, along with an annual income of $4000. The council were initially opposed to accepting the gift, being concerned about ongoing maintenance costs for ratepayers. After lobbying by the Friends of Olveston group, a Theomin Gallery Management Committee was established and the home was opened to the public the following year. Besides being open for guided tours of the home and art collection, the museum runs education programmes aimed at local schools, covering domestic technology, the building and design of the house, and Edwardian games and culture. It may also be hired for weddings, and formal dinners in the original dining room. The house is also used as a venue for chamber music concerts, plays and other performances. The house hosts artists-in-residence including printmaker Manu Berry in 2014, and poet Ruth Arnison.

The Friends of Olveston group wound up in 2013, having achieved its aim of 'saving Olveston'. The following year the Olveston Charitable Foundation was launched with the purpose of building funds to secure the home's future and avoid it becoming a "burden on the ratepayer" as desired by Dorothy Theomin.

Olveston has between 30,000 and 40,000 visitors annually, welcoming its 1 millionth visitor in 1989, and its 2 millionth in 2018. It has gained Qualmark Gold status from Tourism New Zealand, an award which "recognises the best sustainable tourism businesses in New Zealand". In 2014 TripAdvisor named Olveston as New Zealand's top attraction, but only 4% of visitors are from Dunedin.

=== Media appearances ===
Olveston was used as the setting for historical mini-dramas in the TV magazine series Spot On. In 2017 Dunedin musician Dudley Benson released a remake of Shona Laing's (Glad I'm) Not A Kennedy, with a video recorded at Olveston. The hall and staircase appeared as part of the interior of the Lavania royal residence in the 2022 film The Royal Treatment.

== Construction and layout ==
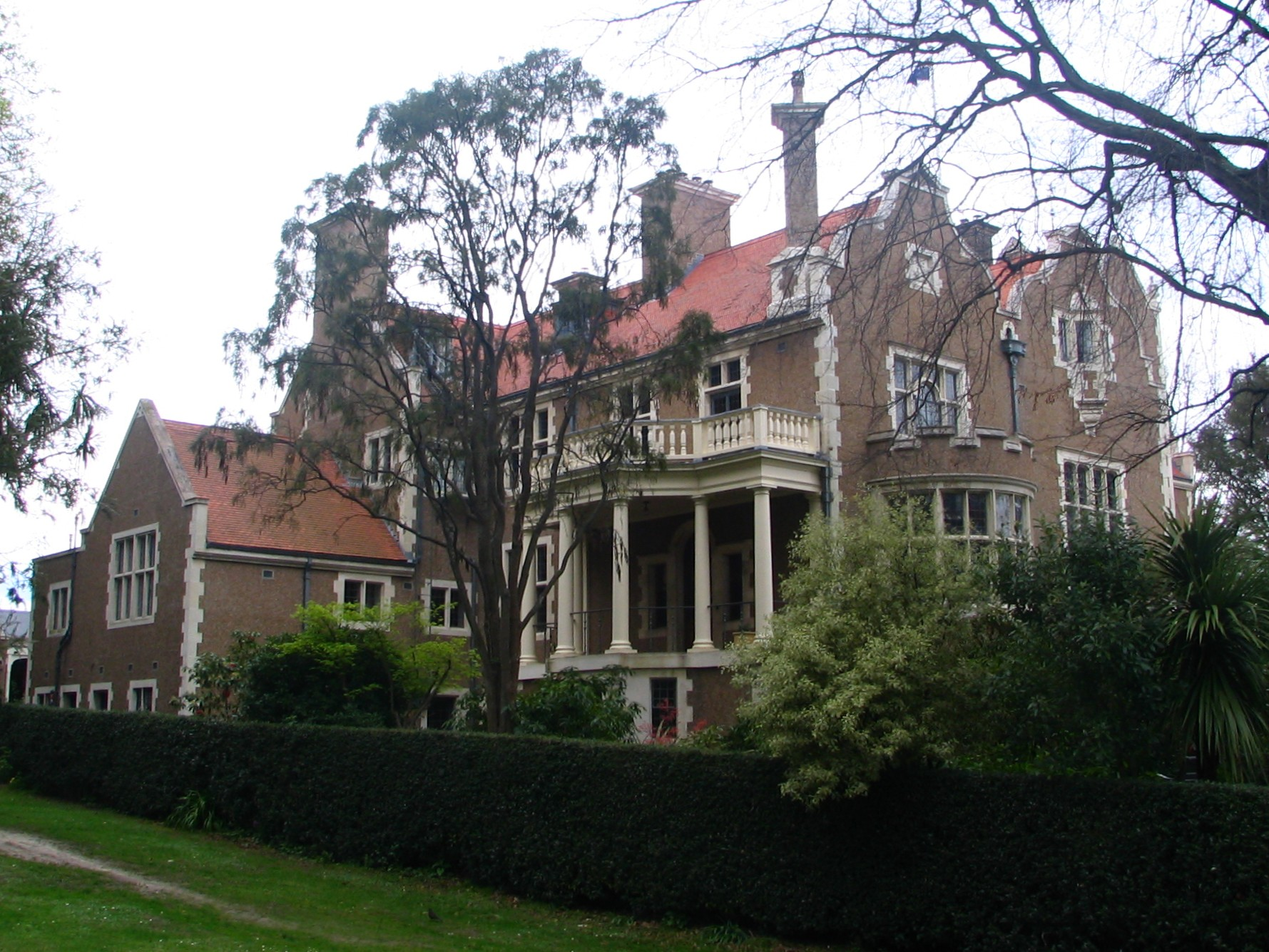
Olveston (west side) viewed from Queens Drive

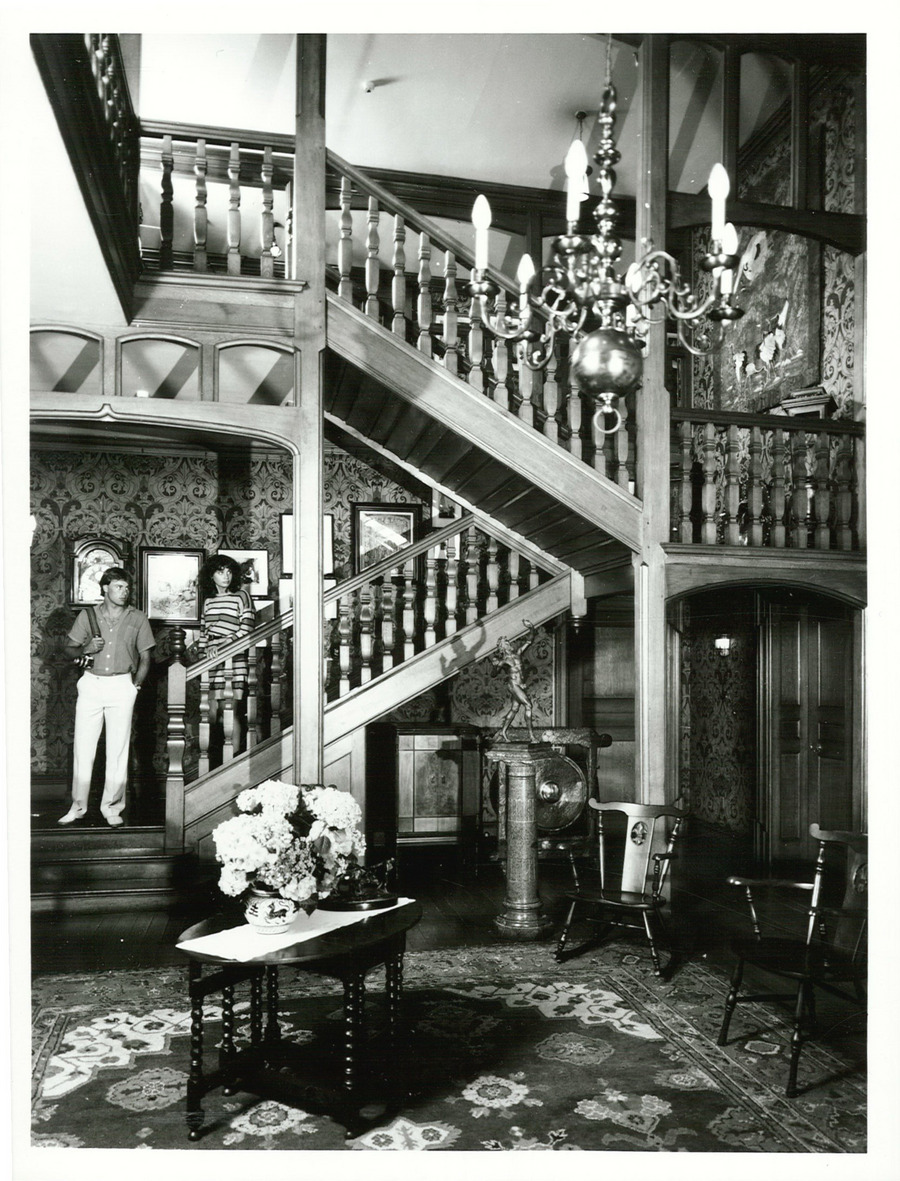
Admiring the exhibits from the main stairway, 1982

The house was built in the Jacobean style to plans prepared by the London architect Sir Ernest George. It is George's only known Southern Hemisphere building. It was fitted with all the latest conveniences, such as central heating, an internal telephone system, a service lift, a food mixer, heated towel rails and an electric toaster. The lighting was electric, with a generator in the basement providing electricity. It has 35 rooms, with a total floor area of 1276 m^{2}.

The building is brick rendered in Moeraki gravel with Oamaru stone facings, and is roofed with Marseilles tiles. The main entrance and some principal rooms face east. The outlook is principally to the garden and the Town Belt bush, providing attractive views and belying the proximity of the central city. The quality of the materials and the standard of the craftsmanship are high. The supervising architects were the Dunedin firm of Mason & Wales and the builder was Robert Meikle. The stonemason was H. S. Bingham, the glaziers Andrew Lees Ltd, and the plumbers A. & T. Burt Ltd.

Architectural historian Hilary Grainger compared Olveston to George's other work, and thought the high Dutch gables, window details, door canopy and rainwater heads were reminiscent of their other private houses, and the shaped gables similar to those found at Poles and Busbridge Hall. The straight gables are more similar to those found at Batsford and Motcombe (now Port Regis School). She considered the round bay window in the dining room and the oriel window above the great hall to be more unusual features. Grainger also notes that the stair and gallery arrangement, with half-landing and open arcades, is identical to that designed by George for 52 Cadogan Square.

The British architectural historian Sir Nikolaus Pevsner visited Olveston in August 1958 and described Olveston as "an extremely interesting and very grand house". He also noted that Ernest George was one of five or six pre-eminent English architects at the time of its commission. Although Heritage New Zealand describe the house as "quite unrelated to the development of New Zealand domestic architecture", Knight and Wales consider that George and local architect Basil Hooper were both introducing new ideas to Dunedin "at a time when there was very little inspired work being done." Charles and Jessie Speight's house, Haeata, at 273 York Place, bears a strong resemblance to Olveston. Haeata was built in 1915 by Scottish architect John Brown (1875–1923), who was chief draughtsman at Mason & Wales from 1908 to 1914.

The house was designated as Category I status by Heritage New Zealand in 1983. The listing compares the house to Holland House in London, and says it is also "reminiscent of the Elizabethan mansion, Kirby Hall". The report notes that "Olveston shows great attention to form, harmony and proportions. The architectural details are an eclectic combination of tall mullioned bay windows, classical portico, prominent chimneys, crenellations, battlements and turrets."

== Interior and collections ==
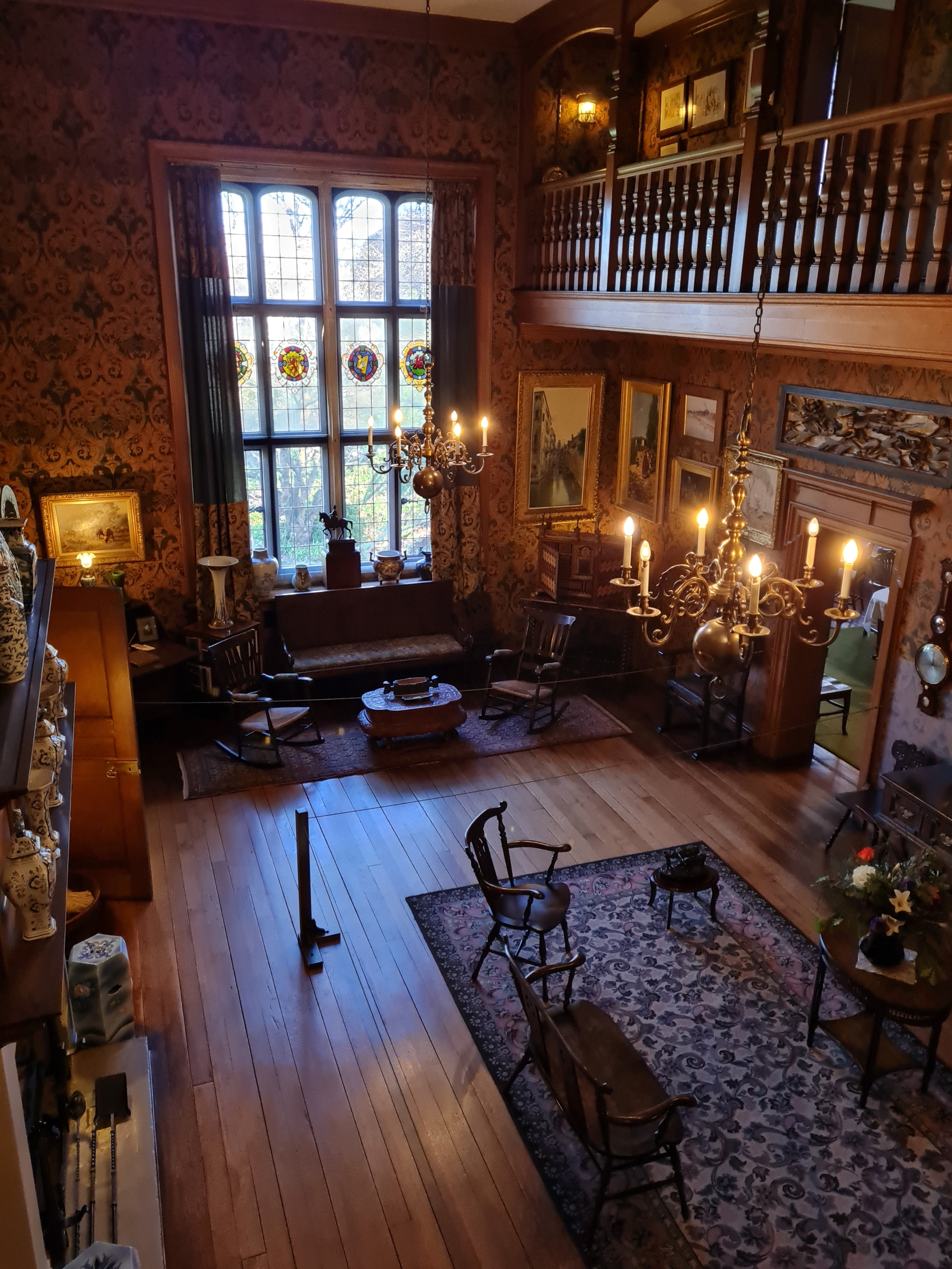
The Great Hall, 2024

The interior of Olveston has been compared by Hardwicke Knight and Niel Wales to the interior designed by Ernest George for Edgeworth Manor in England: "[Edgeworth Manor interior], with its great oak timber roof and stone-lined walls, is one of the finest modern rooms of its kind, and this splendour, although on a smaller scale, is something that can be looked for and found at Olveston."

The flooring, doors and architraves are made of English oak and West Australian jarrah. New Zealand kauri was used to construct the kitchen cupboards, dresser, and tables. The oak stairs and gallery were made by joiners Green and Abbott in London, and then assembled on site, using no nails. The printed hessian wallpaper in the hall was made by Turnbull and Stockdale of Lancashire, based on a Renaissance acanthus-leaf design. The dining-room and library wallpaper were made by Birge and Co of Buffalo, New York. Stained-glass windows were provided by London firms Bryans and Webb, and G. F. Malins. The drawing room contains the only decorated ceiling in the house.

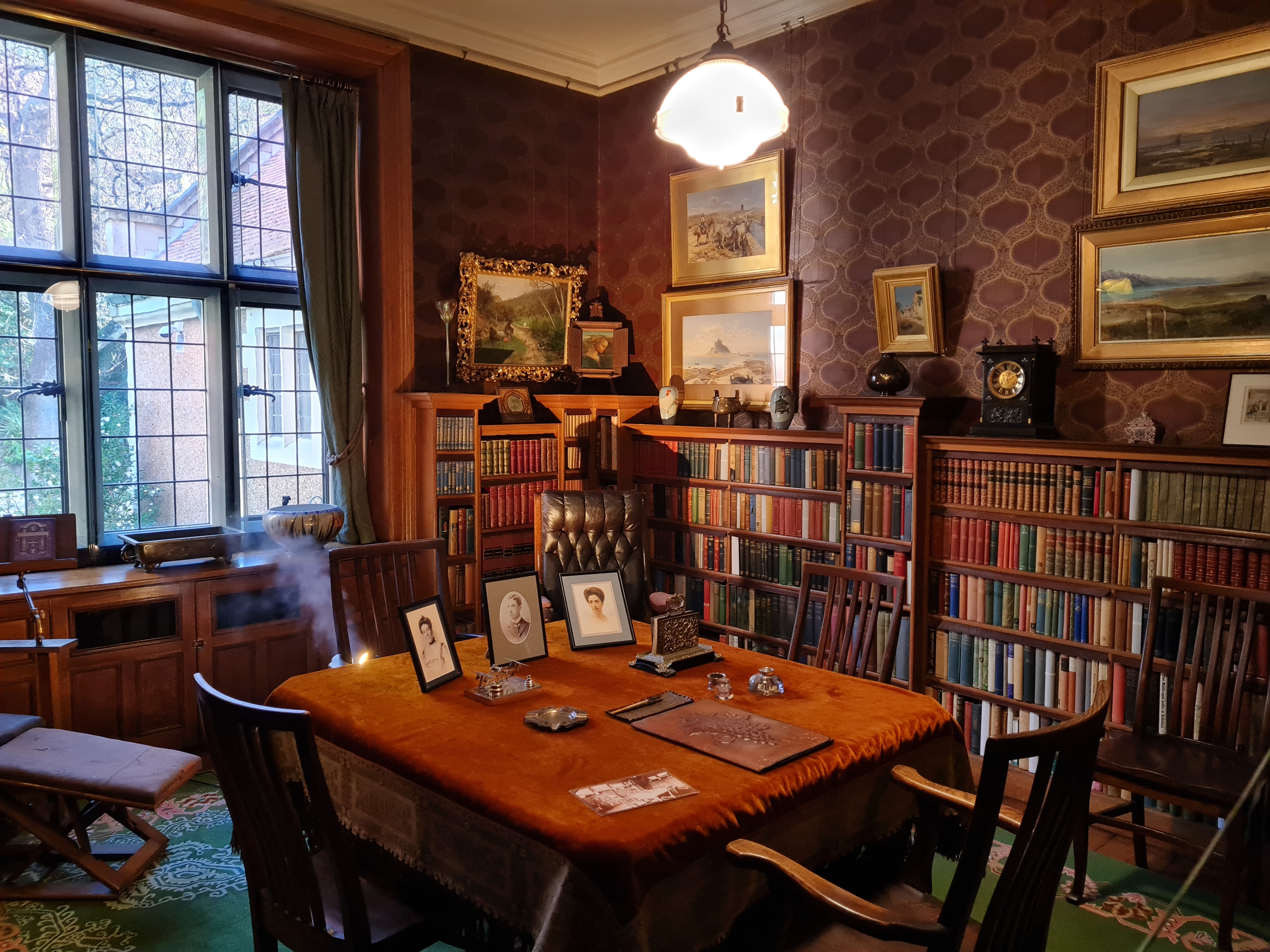
The library, 2024

=== Layout ===
The layout has reception rooms, a library (originally designed as a breakfast room), kitchen and guest rooms downstairs. A galleried hall rises through the ground and upper floors and served as a ballroom. Unusually there is a billiard room upstairs on the bedroom floor. The Card Room, also known as the Persian Room, functions as a small lounge off the billiard room. A 'Juliet' window is an unusual feature, allowing a connection between guests and family socialising upstairs, and events in the reception area below. The top floor was the servants' quarters, and today provides space for the artist-in-residence.

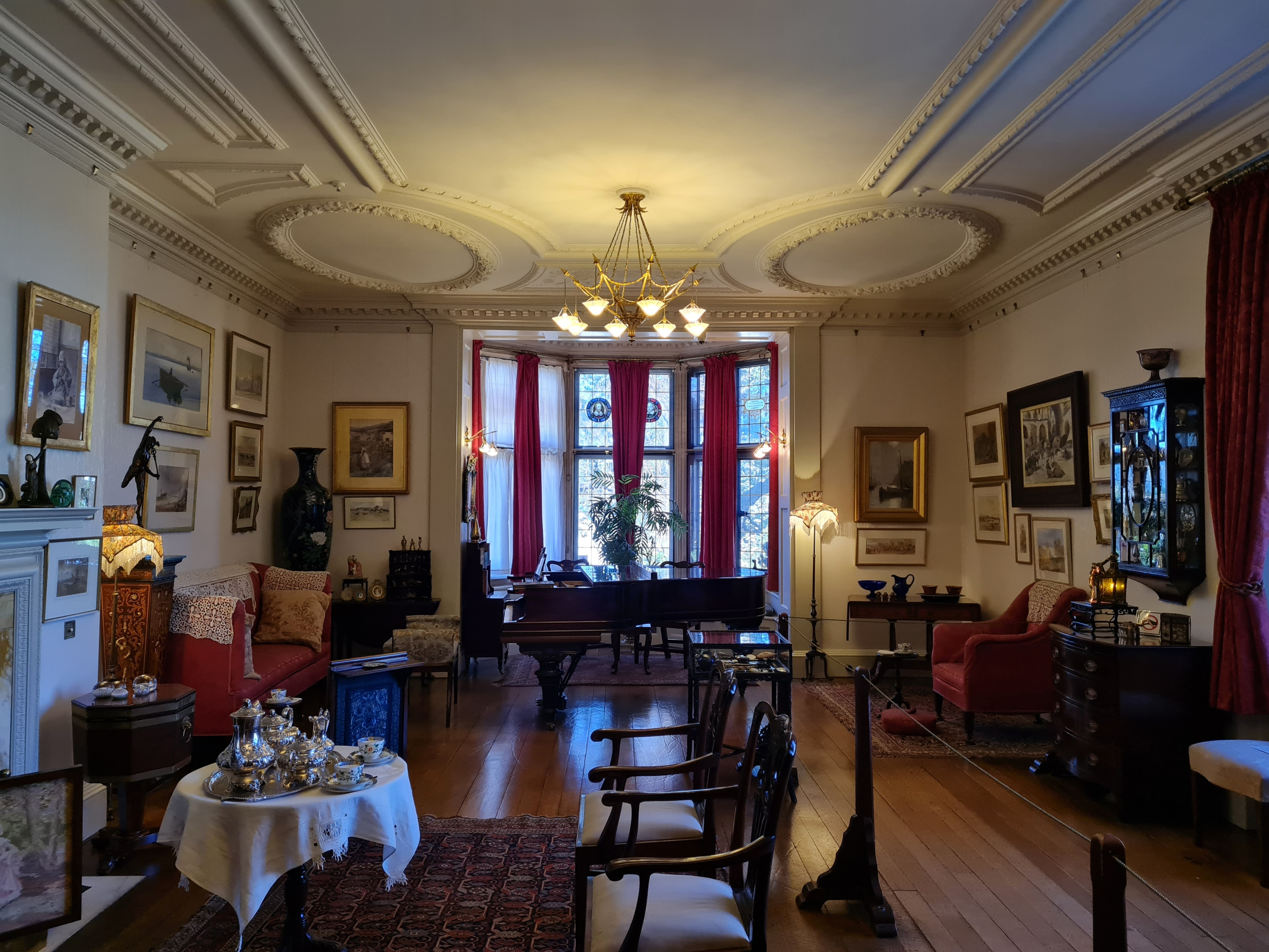
The drawing room, 2024

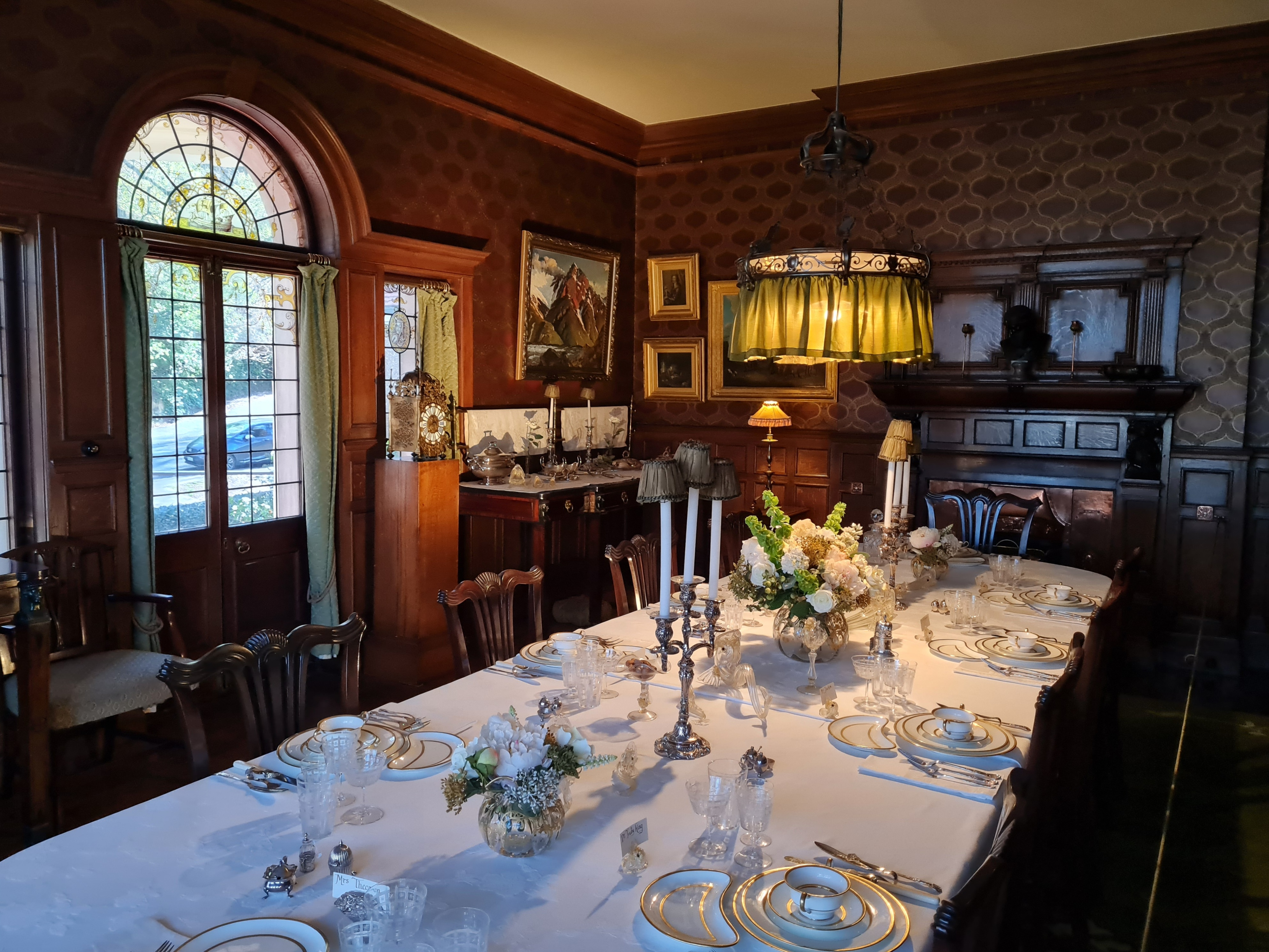
The dining room, 2024

=== Reception rooms ===
The Great Hall is dominated by the oak stairs and gallery, and a large fireplace. It houses a distinctive Turkey carpet and a 1770 grandfather clock by John Dison of St Ives. There are two Jacobean-style chandeliers, a mullioned stained glass window, a revolving bookcase and a late-17th century oak sideboard. The hall leads into the dining room and library on one side, and the drawing-room on the other. The dining room contains a Chippendale-style single pedestal table, for informal dining, and Hepplewhite design chairs. There is a 1760 French ormolu lantern clock, four 'spectacular' William IV silver candlesticks and an oak overmantel to the fireplace with carved figures which may date from the late 16th century.

The library is a warm room with oak panelling and mantelpiece, and simulated leather wallpaper. There are Staffordshire pottery figures and Capodimonte style porcelain, and a pencil portrait and photographs of the family. The drawing room has a lighter and more feminine feel, and houses a Chippendale-style bureau and chest, and a 1906 Steinway grand piano. Brass, porcelain, silver, coloured glassware and enamel collections are on display. A marble bust of Marie Theomin, by Herbert Hampton, was commissioned on the Theomin's silver wedding anniversary in January 1904.

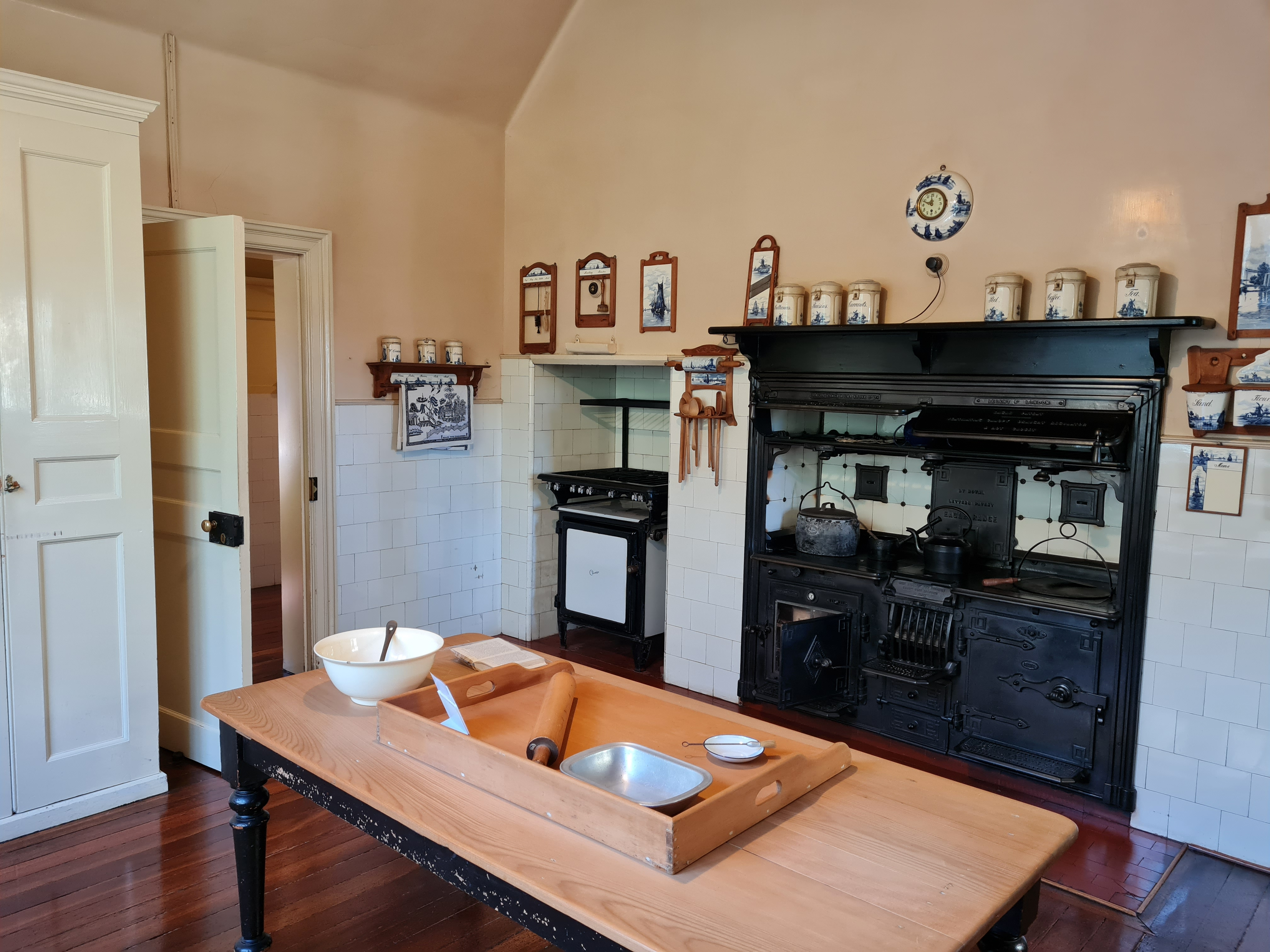
The kitchen with original coalrange, 2024

=== Kitchen, scullery and butler's pantry ===
The kitchen contains an Eagle Range Company coal range from Regent Street, London rather than the Dunedin-made Shacklock range one might expect to see. The range has two ovens and nine hotplates, a temperature gauge and a mica viewing window. The kitchen dresser and tables are kauri, and there is a collection of blue and white 'Delft-ware' tiles, canisters, jars and so on from Frankfurt. Labour-saving appliances include a bean-slicer, coffee-percolator, cherry pitters, grinders and dough-forcers.

The scullery has a large collection of ingredient jars kept on open shelves for easy access, rather than in cupboards. There is a double sink allowing the separation of meat and dairy, and a marble pastry bench. The scullery has a window with outside steps allowing deliveries to be accepted without letting the delivery boy inside.

The butler's pantry contains the tableware and safe. The main dinner service is plain white Wedgewood with a gilded border, and there is a Venetian glass table service. A soft-paste Bloor Derby dessert service dating from 1830 to 1840 may have been an heirloom from the Michaelis family. An 1810 silver meat dish from London kept dishes warm using 1.5 gallons of hot water in its base.

=== Billiard room and Persian room ===
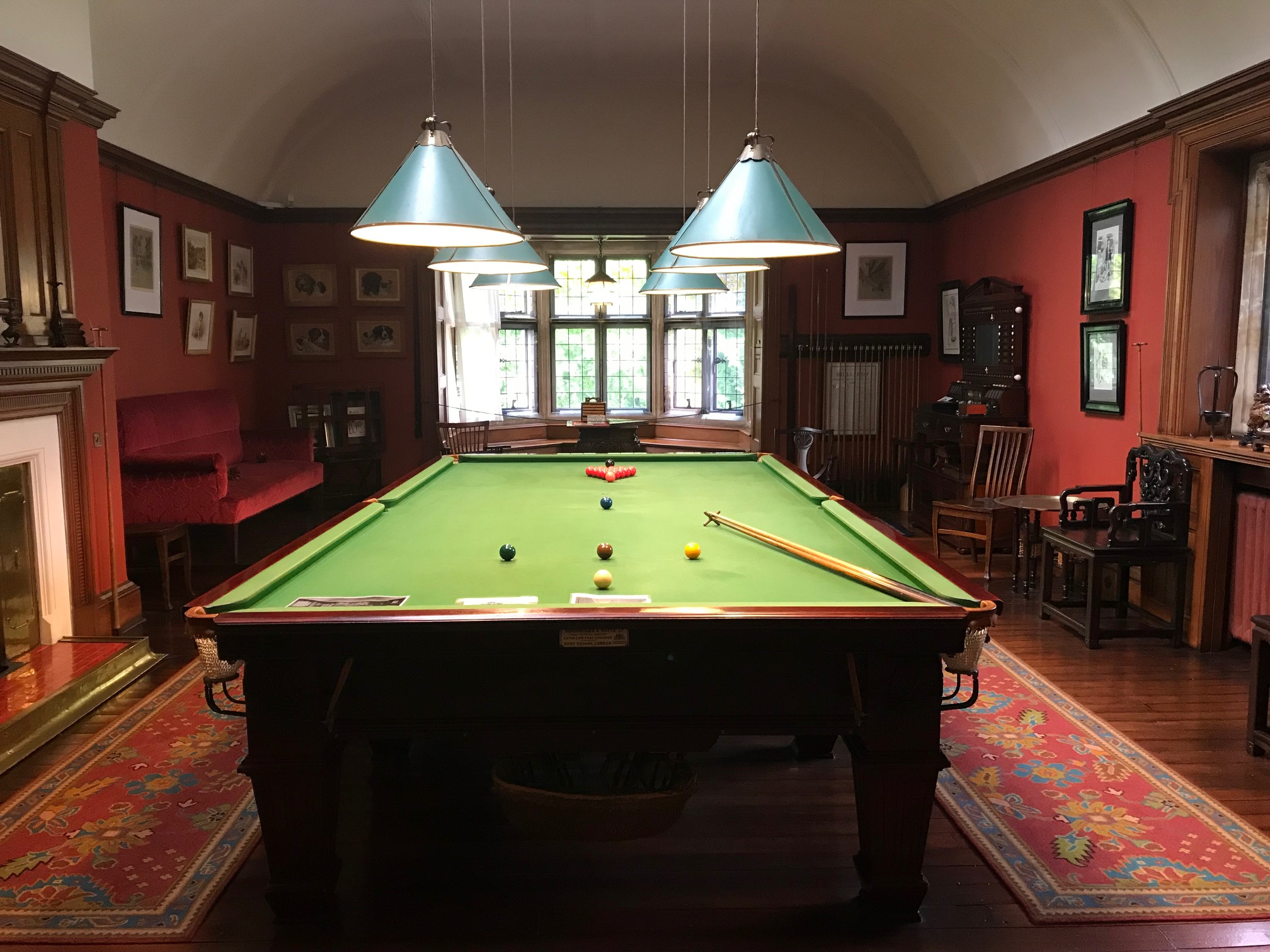
Billiard room with table made by Burroughes and Watts of Soho

The billiard table is a full Olympic size table, weighing two tonnes, and required reinforcing steel girders underneath the floorboards. There is a raised platform with seating enabling a comfortable view of the game. A stained glass section in the bay window featuring an image of the Green Man is made by the grisaille technique. An 18th-century Canton enamel urn from the reign of Emperor Chi'en Lung is also positioned in the billiard room, and there are cabinets displaying collections of inro, tsuba and cloisonné miniatures.

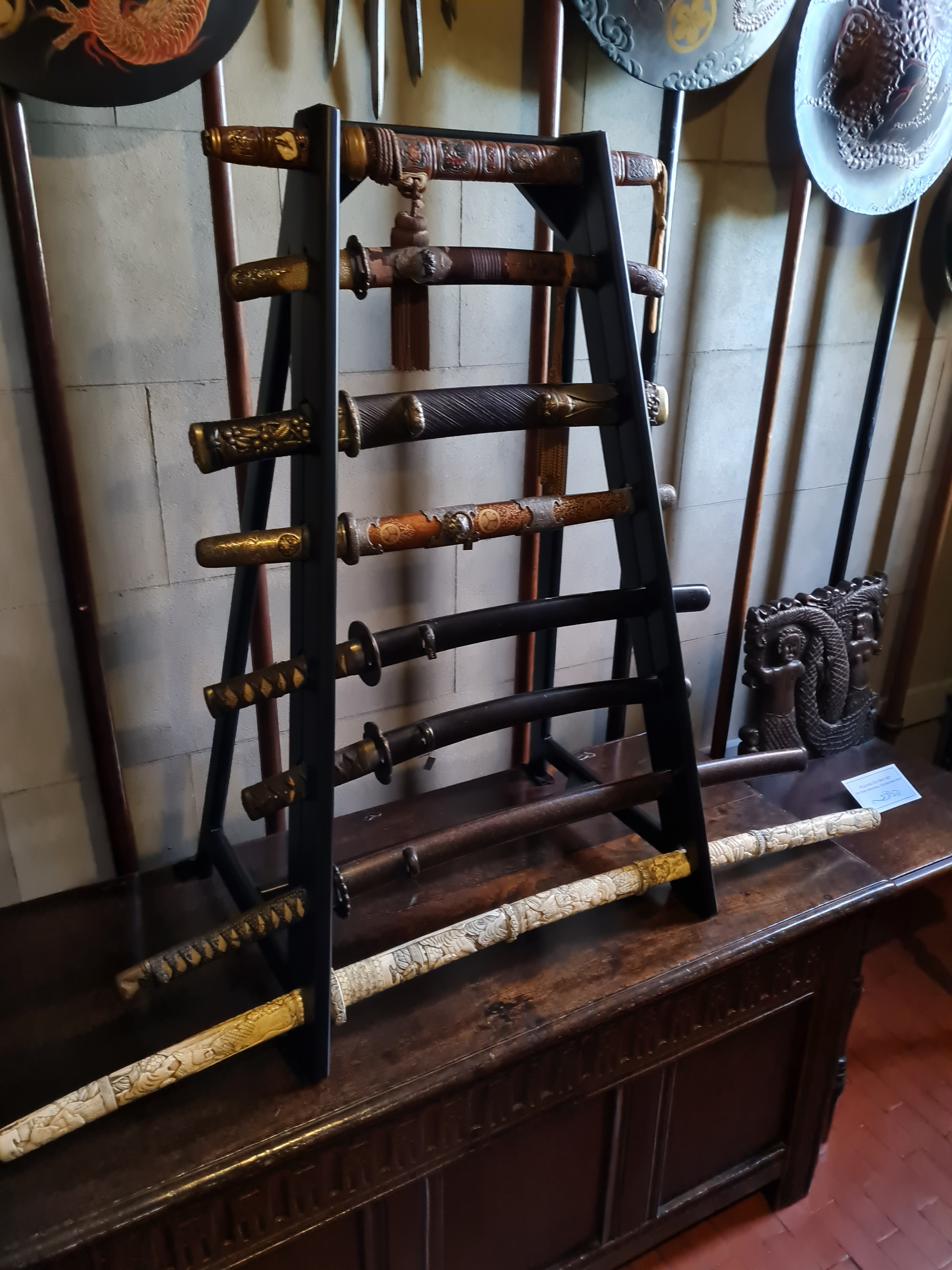
Japanese katana, 2024

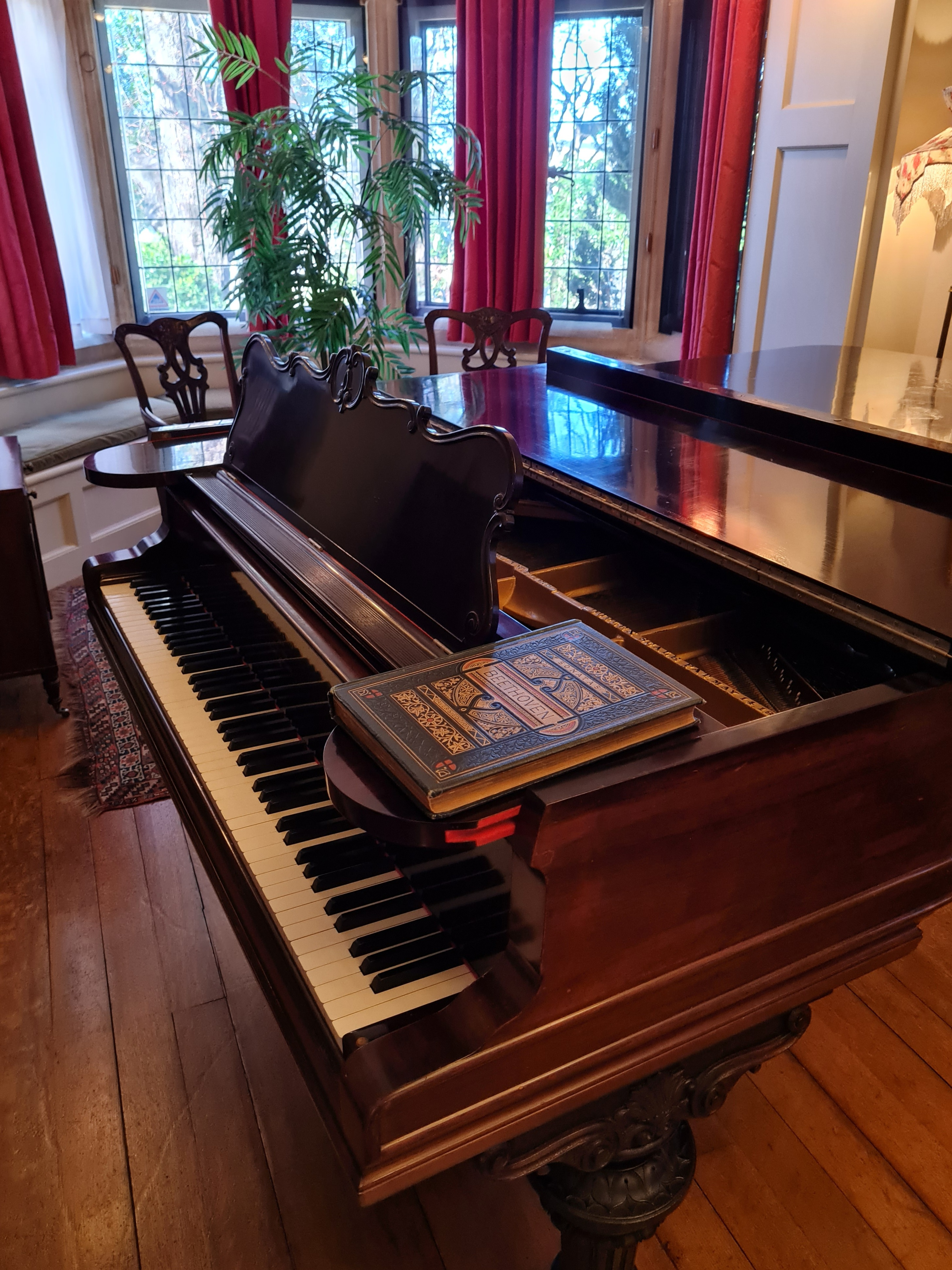
The Steinway & Sons grand piano, located in the drawing room, 2024

=== Collections ===
The Theomins collected art, ceramics, weapons, decorative items and furniture. They acquired significant Japanese material, including collections of inro and tsuba, and cloisonné miniatures. Two Japanese ramma panels (pierced ventilation panels), decorated with carved peony flowers and the Japanese phoenix, are located in the great hall. The vestibule houses an exhibition of predominantly Japanese weaponry collected by David Theomin, including Tokugawa Shogunate helmets, two 'Moorish' flintlocks and an 18th-century flintlock pistol, as well as a terracotta copy of Verrochio's David, and a carved oak bear. The statue of a dancing faun is a copy of a faun excavated from the House of the Faun at Pompeii, albeit with the addition of a fig leaf, and was originally displayed in the great hall.

The ceramic collection includes blue and white ware, Staffordshire flatback figures, and four c1775 hard-paste porcelain figures from Bristol representing Europe, Asia, Africa and America. There is a collection of coloured glass, including French glass and Bristol blue glass, and brass and silverware, including a silver tea service.

Embroideries in the house include work from Turkey, India, Morocco and central Asia. There are Japanese embroideries in their original positions on the walls of the hall, stairway, sitting room and bedroom. Some of Marie and Dorothy's embroideries are included in the velvet curtains in the Persian Room. The two cushions on the settee in the billiard room were embroidered by Marie Mercer, and were a birthday present from Florence Phillips, daughter of Bert Mercer.

The Theomins were supporters of the Dunedin Public Art Gallery, and had a significant art collection of their own, which includes works by W.M. Hodgkins, Frances Hodgkins, Alfred Henry O'Keeffe and Frank Brangwyn, Duncan Darroch (1888–1967), Australian artist Robert Johnson, Grace Joel, Kathleen Salmond, Rata Lovell-Smith, Sydney Thompson, Charlton Edgar, and Edgar Seelye. Four watercolours by popular Victorian 'chocolate-box' artist Myles Birket Foster hang in the dining room. Three lithographs from Cecil Aldin's Coaching Inns of England series hang in the billiard room. Frances Hodgkins' watercolour Orange Sellers, Tangier, which hangs on the stairs, was commissioned in 1902 after Hodgkins had bumped into the Theomins on a boat in Tangier. She commented in a letter to a friend that "They seemed to be buying up the whole of Europe - but doing it in such a delightful light-hearted fashion that one doesn't mind in the least."

Dorothy added paintings by a number of New Zealand women artists to the collection, including Airini Vane and Phyllis Sharpe. More recently a painting by Ernest George of his London offices was gifted to the Olveston collection in 2018 by a great-grandson of Dunedin businessman Richard Hudson, the founder of Hudson and Co.

== Gardens ==
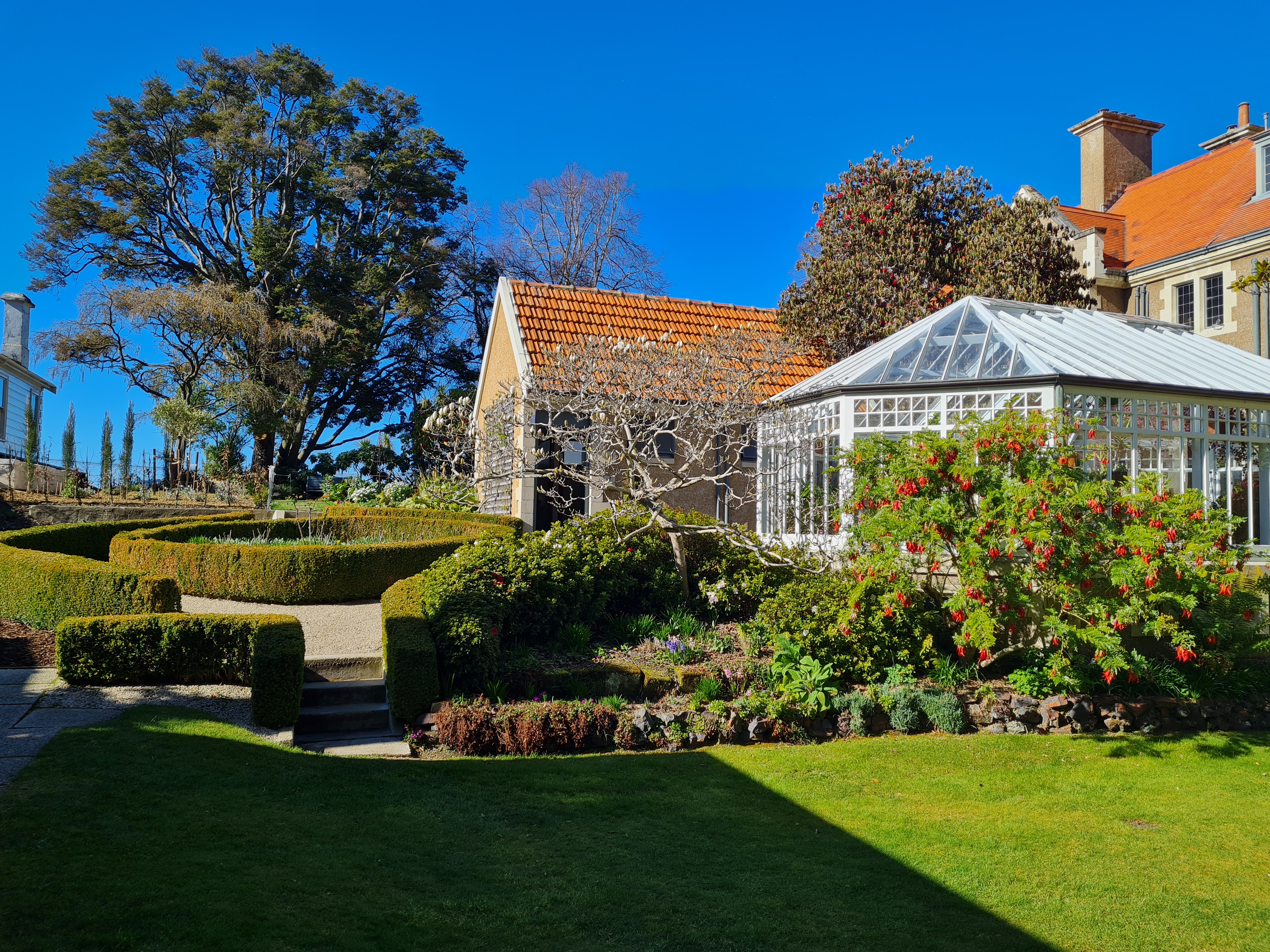
The garden and conservatory, 2024

The gardens were designated as a "five star" Garden of National Significance by the New Zealand Gardens Trust in 2014. There is an Edwardian-style glasshouse, a potager, and holly and camellia hedges. The gardens are not considered original to the house. Early photographs show a large rose garden and mature cabbage tree have been replaced with a lawn and four beds. The gardens contain a number of significant red, black and copper beech trees. In 2022 a significant large red beech had to be removed to protect a neighbouring property. The gardens are free to access between 9 and 5 daily.

A garage was added to the property in 1915. The family's original 1921 Fiat 510 Tourer was returned to the house in 1994 and is now on display.
