= Gordon Tovey =

English cricketer and schoolmaster

Personal information
- Full name: Gordon Charles Tovey
- Born: 6 July 1912; Salisbury, Wiltshire, England
- Died: 16 April 1994 (aged 81); Olveston, Gloucestershire, England
- Batting: Right-handed

Domestic team information
- Years: Team
- 1933: Cambridge University
- 1929–1953: Dorset

Career statistics
Competition	First-class
Matches	1
Runs scored	3
Batting average	1.50
100s/50s	–/–
Top score	2
Balls bowled	–
Wickets	–
Bowling average	–
5 wickets in innings	–
10 wickets in match	–
Best bowling	–
Catches/stumpings	–/–
- Source: Cricinfo, 2 October 2018

Gordon Charles Tovey (4 July 1912 – 16 April 1994) was an English first-class cricketer and schoolmaster.

Tovey was born at Salisbury, Wiltshire in July 1912. He was educated at Clifton College, where he played for the cricket eleven from 1928 to 1931. Tovey made his debut in minor counties cricket for Dorset in the 1929 Minor Counties Championship. He later studied at the University of Cambridge, during which he made his only appearance in first-class cricket for Cambridge University against Northamptonshire at Fenner's in 1933. He continued to play minor counties matches for Dorset throughout the thirties.

Tovey served in the Royal Artillery in the Second World War, holding the rank of second lieutenant in October 1941. Following the war, he founded the independent Tockington Manor preparatory school in Tockington, Gloucestershire. His son, Richard, later served as headmaster of the school for 38 years. Tovey continued to play minor counties cricket alongside his school commitments, playing until 1953, having made 131 appearances for Dorset in the Minor Counties Championship. He died at Olveston, Gloucestershire, in April 1994.
