= 1–8 Collingham Gardens =

Buildings in Kensington and Chelsea, London

Coordinates: 51.4917°N 0.1873°W

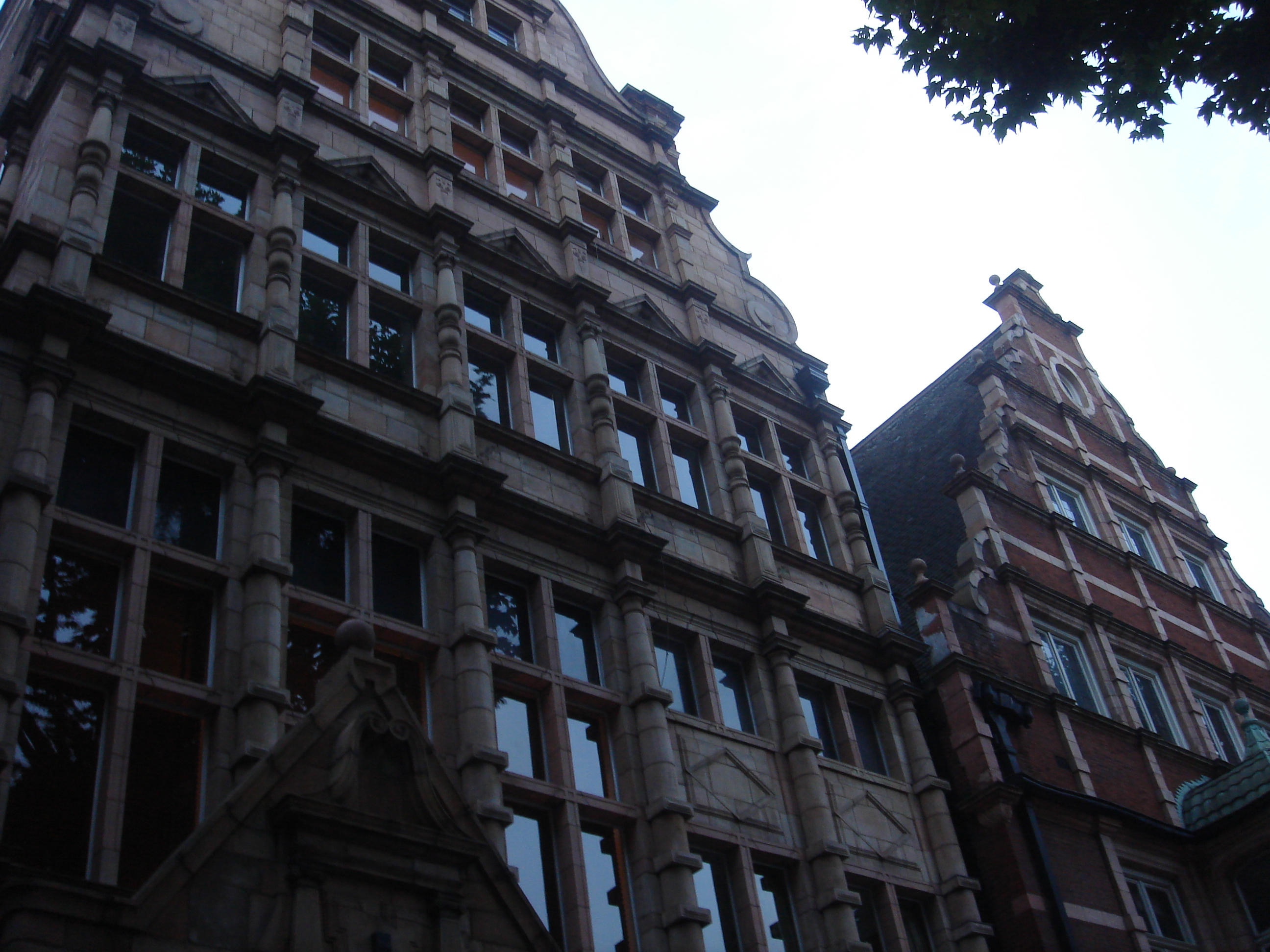
1–8 Collingham Gardens

1–8 Collingham Gardens are eight Grade II* listed houses in Collingham Gardens in the Royal Borough of Kensington and Chelsea, London. The houses were built by the firm of Ernest George and Peto between 1883 and 1888. Architecturally, they are representative of late-Victorian individualism.

No 1 Collingham Gardens is a corner house with three frontages, including one on Bolton Gardens. Originally styled "The House of the Seven Gables", The British Architect noted in 1886 that it was "English in character of composition and detail".

No 4 and No 5 Collingham Gardens are Flemish in architectural treatment.

Nos 6, 7, and 8 on the northern end of Collingham Gardens feature tall Dutch gables, which have been called "particularly fine specimens".
