= Old Down =

Hamlet in Gloucestershire, England

Coordinates: 51.584°N 2.555°W

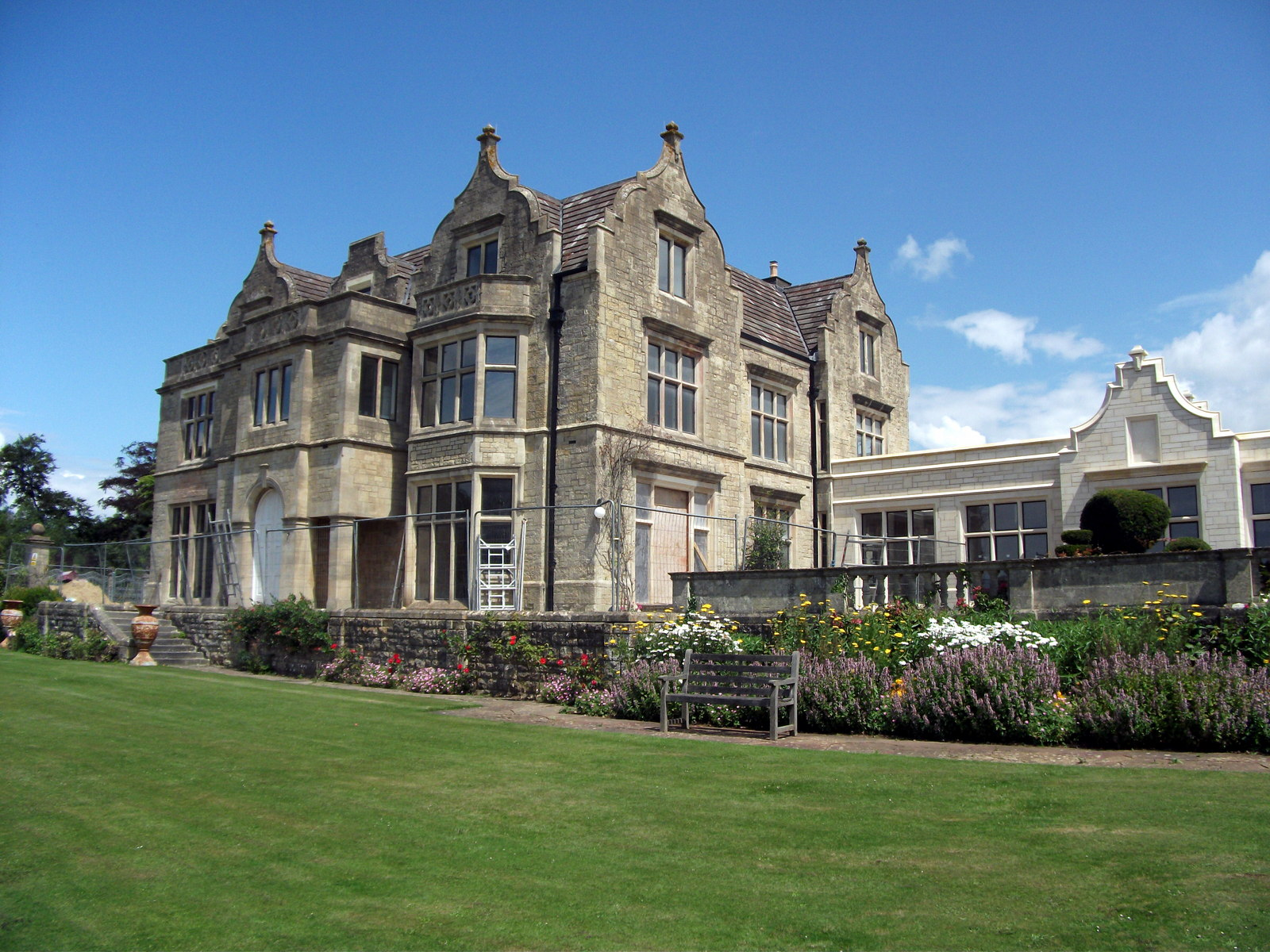
Old Down Manor

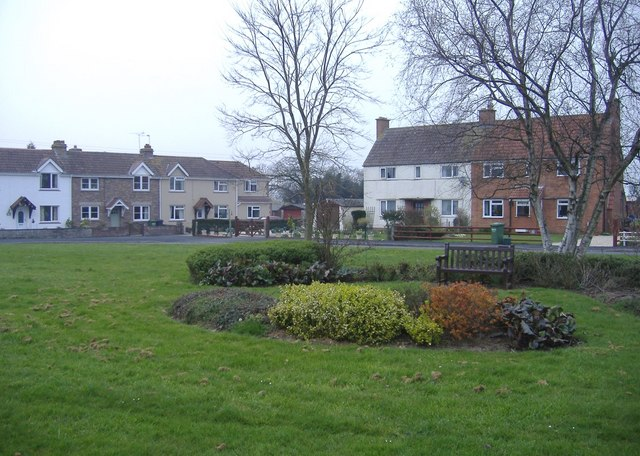
The Crescent, Old Down

Old Down is a hamlet in South Gloucestershire, near the larger villages of Olveston and Tockington. A tourist attraction called Old Down Country Park now occupies the country house in the village, and there is also a pub, The Fox, as well as several sporting facilities (a cricket club, football pitch and a bowling green).

Old Down Manor was built in 1856 for Thomas Ward Johnson, sold in 1881 to William Hartford and altered by Sir George Oatley, and rebuilt in 1952 after a fire. As of 2013 it was available for weddings and private events. It is on the National Heritage List for England.
