= Ernest George =

English architect and painter (1839–1922)

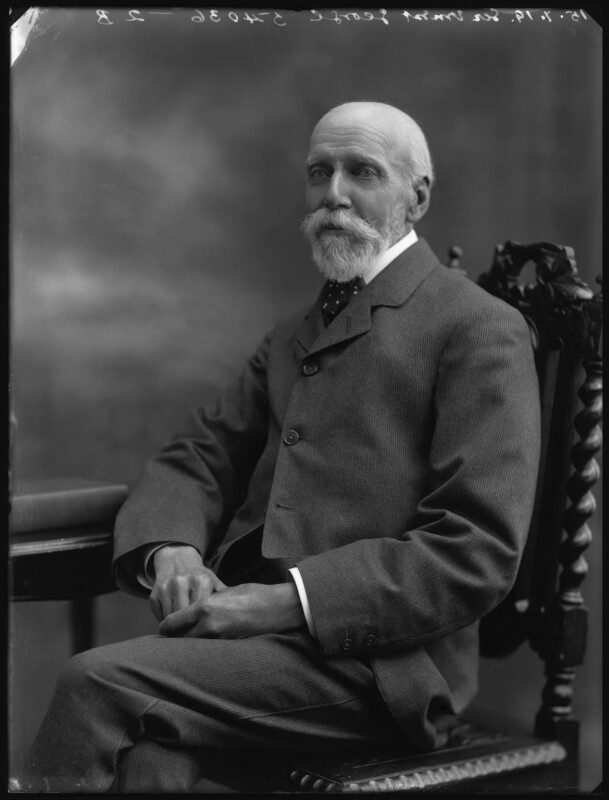
George in 1919

Sir Ernest George RA (13 June 1839 – 8 December 1922) was an English architect, landscape and architectural watercolourist, and etcher.

== Life and work ==
Born in London, Ernest George began his architectural training in 1856, under Samuel Hewitt, coupled with studies at the Royal Academy Schools 1857–59. After a short period in the office of Allen Boulnois, he went on a sketching tour of France and Germany, which inspired him to the architectural style that would make him famous.

On his return to London, he set up an architectural practice in 1861 with Thomas Vaughan. They had their breakthrough in 1869, when George was contacted by the tea and spice importer and Member of Parliament Henry Peek (son of James Peek, who started the biscuit business Peak Frean & Co). He was about to buy the village of Rousdon in Devon, and wanted George to build him a large mansion house south of the village, plus several other buildings. This complex became eventually known as the Rousdon Estate, and from 1930 to 1998 the George-designed mansion house served as the private boarding school Allhallows College.

Vaughan suddenly died on 2 March 1875 aged 39, forcing George to find another partner. He chose the young Harold Peto, mainly because of the Peto family's vast contact network in the building industry. During this partnership, George designed houses in London for the Cadogan Estate in Chelsea and Kensington. In 1881 they designed Stoodleigh Court at Tiverton for Thomas Carew. In 1891 they designed an extension to West Dean House for William James, creating the Oak Room, now Oak Hall, in West Dean College.

In 1891, Harold Peto decided to leave London for health reasons, and to devote more time to his interests in garden design, at which point George made a former pupil, Alfred Bowman Yeates, his new partner.

In New Zealand, which he never visited, he designed the Theomin family house Olveston, in Dunedin, which was built in 1904–07.

He was also responsible for the current Southwark Bridge (1921), and the Memorial to Heroic Self-Sacrifice in London's Postman's Park.

He served as president of the Royal Institute of British Architects from 1908 to 1910.

Ernest George's London office was nicknamed "The Eton of architects", and the 79 pupils included Herbert Baker, Guy Dawber, John Bradshaw Gass, Edwin Lutyens and Ethel Charles. Ethel Charles was the first woman to be elected a member of the Royal Institute of British Architects.

George died in London at 71 Palace Court, Bayswater, in 1922, aged 83, and was cremated at Golders Green Crematorium, of which he and Alfred Yeates had been the architects, and where the Ernest George Columbarium is named for him.

George's residence at 17 Bartholomew Street, London Borough of Southwark, is commemorated with a Southwark Council blue plaque.

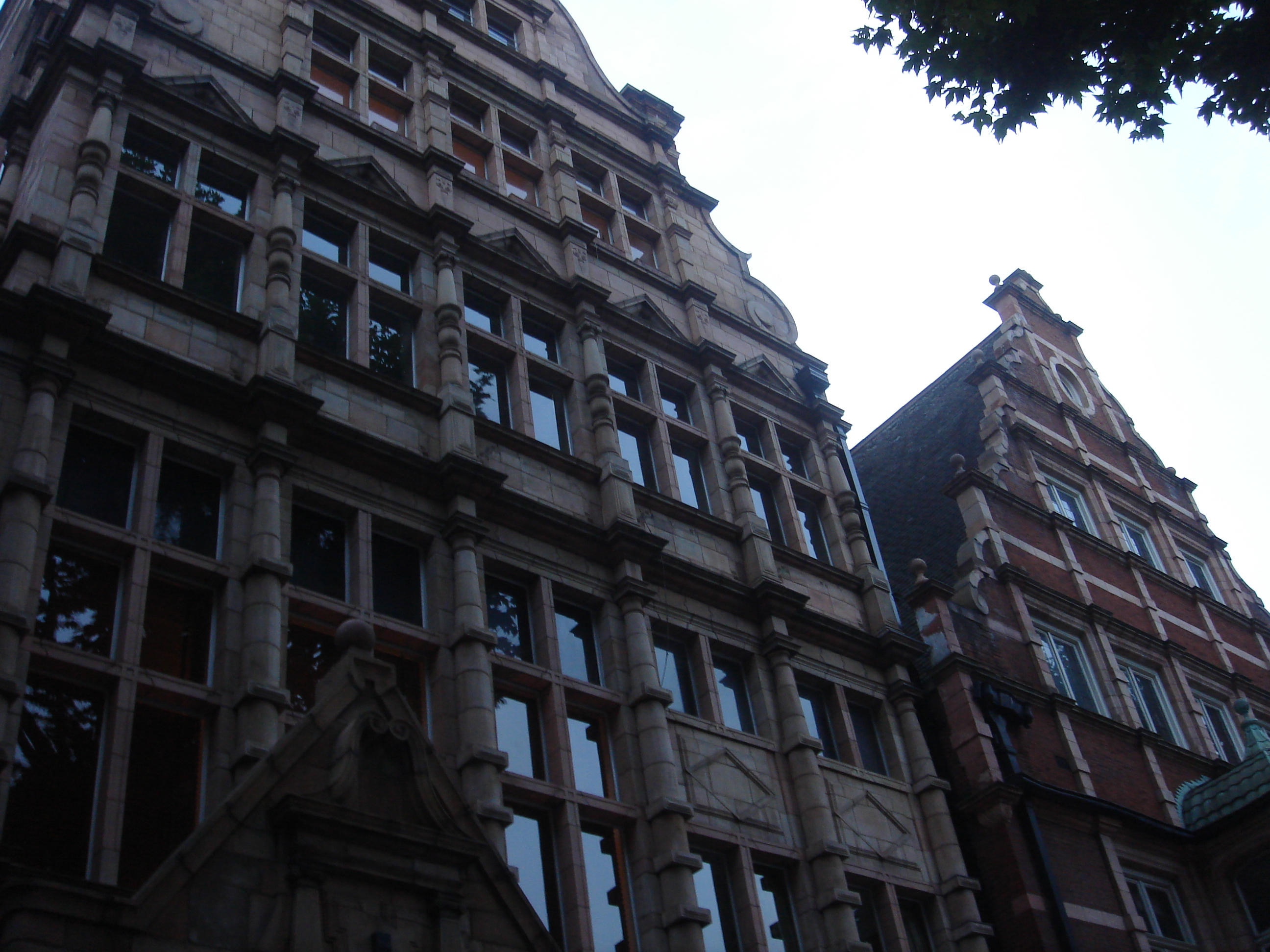
1–8 Collingham Gardens

== Buildings by Ernest George ==
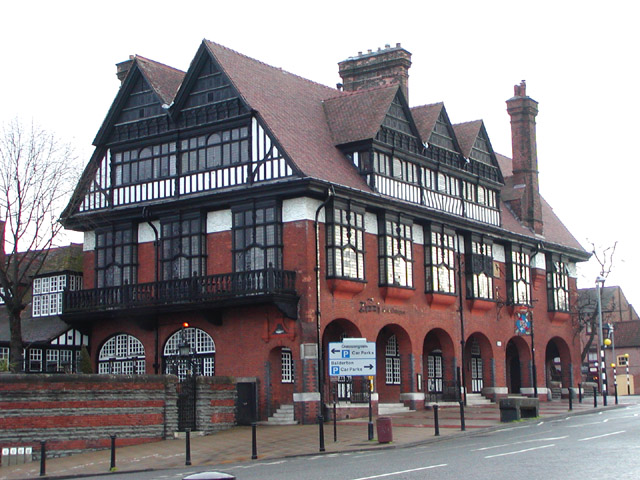
Ossington Coffee House, Newark on Trent

- Rousdon House (for Sir Henry Peek of Peek Freans; became Allhallows School in 1938) Rousdon, Devon (1870)
- 1–8 Collingham Gardens, Earls Court, London (1881–84)
- Shiplake College, Henley-on-Thames, 1890
- 4 & 6 Thornlaw Road, West Norwood, London (1882)
- Ossington Coffee Tavern, Newark on Trent (1882)
- Shockerwick House, Bathford, Somerset, including wings, lodge and "The Clock House" (1896)
- Cawston Manor Water Tower Cawston, Norfolk (1897) designed further by architect John Bennett RIBA of Southwold into residence for David & Jennifer Forster.
- Golders Green Crematorium, London (1902)
- Eynsham Hall, Oxfordshire (1904–08)
- Olveston, Dunedin, New Zealand, for David Theomin (1903)
- Ruckley Grange, Tong, Shropshire (1904)
- Bushridge Hall, Godalming, Surrey (1906)
- Crathorne Hall, North Yorkshire (1906–09)
- Putteridge Bury, Lilley, Hertfordshire (1911)
- Royal Academy of Music, London (1911)

== Painting ==
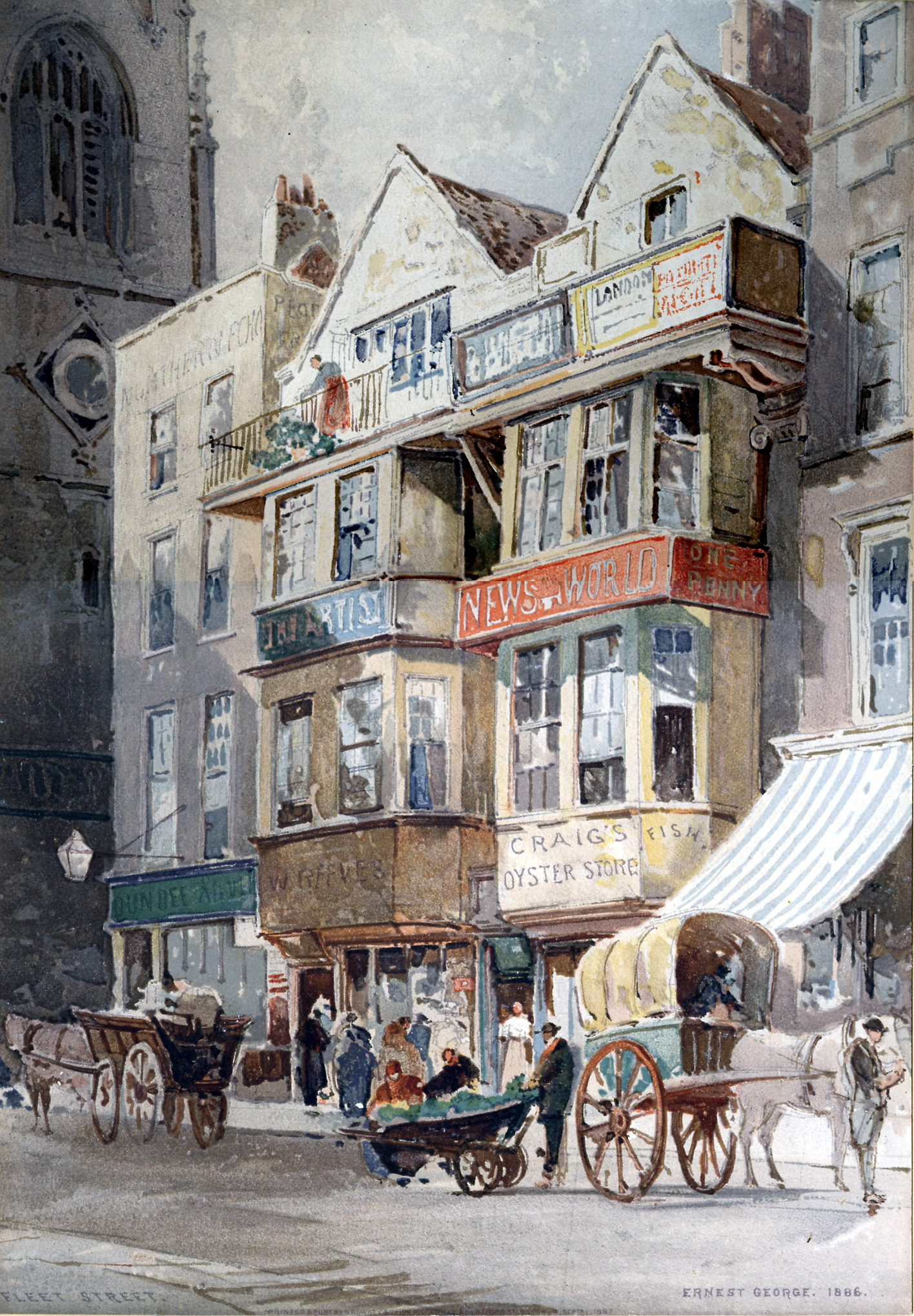
1886 watercolour of Fleet Street by George, from a contemporary print

- George painted in England, Belgium, Holland, France, Germany and Italy.
- An album with pencil-sketches of townscapes in Ostend, Belgium, is kept in the Kunstmuseum aan Zee there
