= Dorothy Theomin =

New Zealand philanthropist and mountaineer

Dorothy Michaelis Theomin (24 December 1888 – 11 October 1966) was a New Zealand philanthropist, mountaineer, and photographer. Some of her photographs are held in the Hocken Collections in Dunedin.

== Biography ==
Dorothy Theomin was born in Dunedin in 1888, the second child of David Theomin and Marie Theomin (née Michaelis). She had an older brother, Edward. She was educated at Braemar House in Dunedin and, from 1902 to 1905, at Roedean School in Sussex. In 1907, she took charge of managing the family's residence, Olveston, as her mother was busy with philanthropic work.

Theomin was involved in mountaineering in the Southern Alps from 1914 to 1933 and was associated with the New Zealand Alpine Club. She also practiced mountain photography during this period.

Later in life, Theomin engaged in philanthropic activities, participating in the Plunket Society and assisting the Red Cross during World War II by sending food parcels and letters of encouragement to prisoners of war. She also supported the Dunedin Public Art Gallery — she was a member of the art gallery's council, vice-president from 1954 to 1957 and president from 1957 to 1959 — and provided financial backing to artists and musicians.

Theomin died at Olveston in 1966 and was buried in the family plot in Dunedin Southern Cemetery. She bequeathed the family property to the citizens of Dunedin and in 1967 Olveston was opened for guided tours.

In 2007, a biography of Theomin was published by the Friends of Olveston Trust.
