= Hewish =

Hewish is a surname. Notable people with the surname include:

- Antony Hewish (1924–2021), English astronomer;
- James Hewish, Australian short track speed skating referee.

== See also ==
- East Hewish and West Hewish, hamlets in the civil parish of Puxton, England
