= Samuel Hewitt =

19th-century Indiana inventor

Samuel Hewitt's "Mormon Haypress"
- Samuel Hewitt's schematics for the haypress he invented, from the patent he submitted on December 30, 1843.

Samuel Hewitt was a small-town inventor from Allensville, Indiana. He invented the "Mormon haypress", which was patented in 1843. The hay press revolutionized the industry, and the county's economy began to focus on hay production. 200 machines were made, but only 4 remain. One of these haypresses resides in a museum in Lawrenceburg, Indiana.

Thiebaud Farm in Switzerland County, Indiana was a site that shipped out hundreds of haybales to the rest of the country along Ohio and Mississippi rivers. For this reason, Samuel Hewitt came up with a faster way to cut and package haybales in the Mormon Haypress. The haypress was 3 stories tall, and was powered usually by farm animals, such as horses or mules. The haypresses themselves also were used in other states, most notably in Kentucky. Hewitt submitted the patent on December 30, 1843, along with a detailed image of the build and function of the machine.
