= Ingst =

Hamlet in Gloucestershire, England

Coordinates: 51.587°N 2.605°W

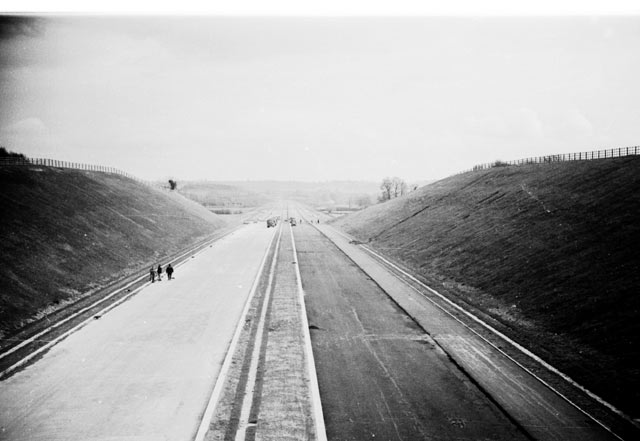
Construction of the M48 (at that time numbered the M4) near the hamlet of Ingst

Ingst is a hamlet in the parish of Olveston in South Gloucestershire, England. It consists of nine households, most of which are farms with cattle.

The M48 motorway passes by the hamlet.
