= Olveston =

Village in South Gloucestershire, England

Coordinates: 51.5820°N 2.5769°W

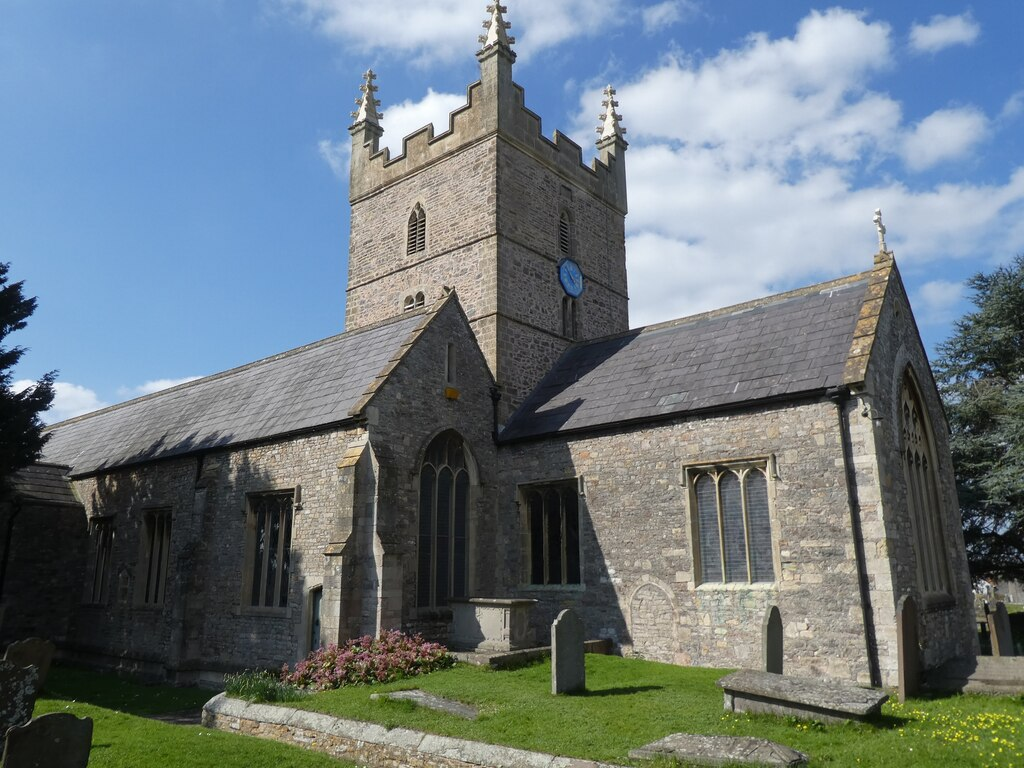
- St Mary's Church, Olveston

- Location within Gloucestershire
- Population: 2,033 (2011 census)
- OS grid reference: ST596865
- Civil parish: Olveston
- Unitary authority: South Gloucestershire
- Ceremonial county: Gloucestershire
- Region: South West
- Country: England
- Sovereign state: United Kingdom
- Post town: Bristol
- Postcode district: BS35
- Dialling code: 01454
- Police: Avon and Somerset
- Fire: Avon
- Ambulance: South Western
- UK Parliament: Thornbury and Yate

Olveston is a small village and civil parish in the South Gloucestershire district, in the ceremonial county of Gloucestershire, England. The parish comprises the villages of Olveston and Tockington, and the hamlets of Old Down, Ingst and Awkley. The civil parish population at the 2011 census was 2,033. Alveston became a separate church parish in 1846. The district has been inhabited since the Stone Age, and the salt marshes that made up almost half of the parish, were progressively drained in Roman and Saxon times. A sea wall was constructed at the same time to prevent flooding from the nearby estuary of the River Severn.

The civil parish forms part of the Severn electoral ward. The parish stretches northwards to Hill. The Severn ward population at the 2011 census was 3,628.

== Church of St. Mary the Virgin ==
The parish church of St Mary the Virgin was built around 1170 and rebuilt in 1370. It was struck by lightning in 1605 and the bells, spire and much of the chancel were destroyed. The tower was rebuilt the following year, and the church has been restored and enlarged in later years. Parish registers survive from 1561. The church contains the funerary brass (dated to 1506), and was the burial place, of Sir Walter Denys (d.1506) and his father Maurice Denys (d.1466), esquire, both lords of the manor, seated at Olveston Court.

== The Denys family of Olveston Court ==
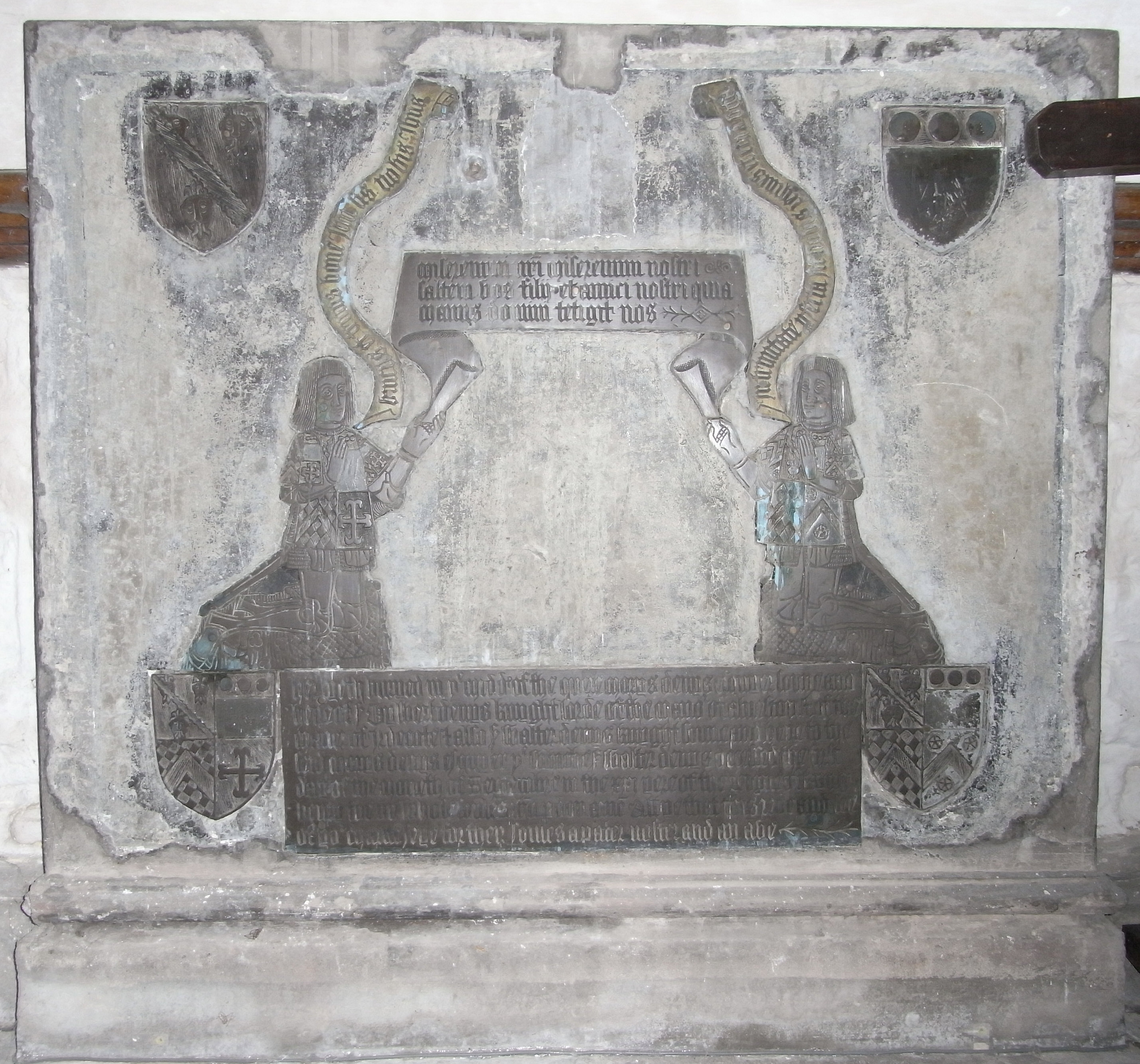
Denys monumental brass, 1505, Olveston Church, east wall of south transept

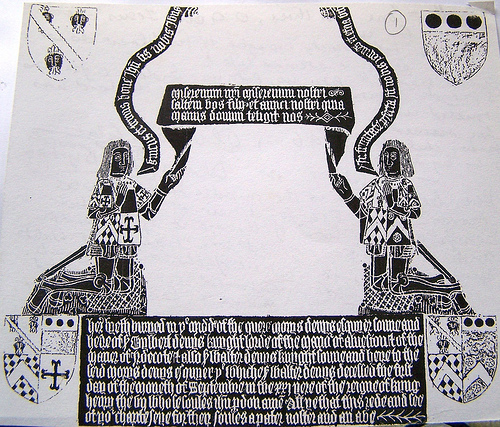
Rubbing from Denys monumental brass, 1505, Olveston Church. Maurice Denys (d.1466) to L. Sir Walter Denys (d.1506), his son, to R. The Denys paternal armorials are blazoned at top left: 3 leopard's faces jessant-de-lis overall a bend engrailled

The remains of the mediaeval fortified manor of Olveston Court stand on the western outskirts of the village. It was for a while the seat of the Denys family of nearby Siston who had inherited Olveston manor, together with nearby Alveston, Earthcott Green, Siston and a moiety (1/2) of Aust together with the rights of the Hundred Court of Langley, in 1380 on marriage to Margaret Corbet, granddaughter of Sir Peter Corbet (d.1362) Lord of Caus, Shropshire. In addition to these Gloucestershire lands, the manors of Lawrenny in Pembrokeshire and Hope-juxta-Caus in Shropshire were also inherited. Due to the possibility for confusion between Alveston and Olveston, the Inquisition post mortem of Sir Gilbert Denys, taken at Chipping Sodbury on 25 June 1422, is given here:

Gilbert Denys held of the King in chief in his demesne as of fee by knight service the manors of Alveston and Earthcott and the Hundred of Langley, total annual value £19 5s. There are in the manor of Alveston 40s assize rents and £6 rents of tenants at will at Michaelmas, Christmas, Easter and the Nativity of St. John the Baptist in equal portions, 300 acres pasture worth yearly 5d an acre, and a 20 acre meadow worth yearly 12d an acre. There are in the manor of Earthcott 40s rents of tenants at will. The Hundred of Langley is worth 40s yearly.
By a charter dated at Olveston on 20th Jan. 1420, shown to the jurors, he held jointly in tail male with his wife Margaret (2nd. wife Margaret Russell), who survives, the manor and advowson of Olveston, reversion to Gilbert's kinsman Nicholas Denys for life, remainder to the right heirs of Gilbert, by feoffment of Robert Stanshawe, John Broune, Robert Coderyngton and John Vaghorn, vicar of St. Nicholas, Bristol. The manor is held of the Bishop of Bath & Wells of the King, service unknown, annual value £20.

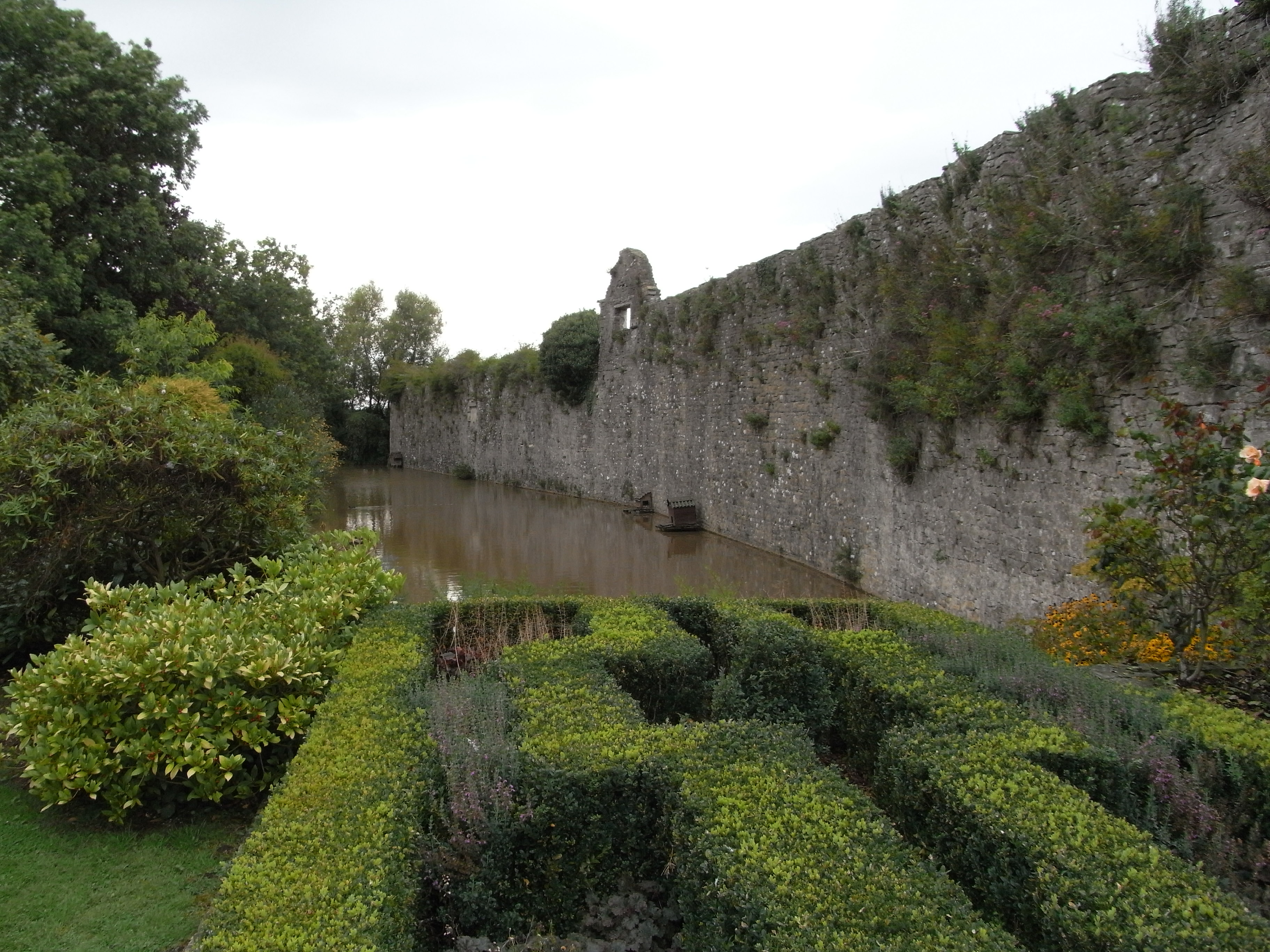
Olveston Court, view of remnant of moat and crenellated wall, situated immediately to the left of the gatehouse as depicted above by Loxton

It is likely the Hundred Court of Langley, under the hereditary jurisdiction of the Denys's, met within the precincts of Olveston Court, which would also have had its own manorial court. The Denys family had lived in Glamorgan, S. Wales during the 13th. & 14th. centuries, most lately at Waterton, near Ewenny Priory, Coity Lordship. The family, it seems, temporarily moved to Olveston Court from Siston in 1422, when the widow of Sir Gilbert Denys (d.1422) obtained Siston as her dower, passing a life interest in it to her younger 2nd. husband John Keymes. Keymes died in 1477, upon which the Denys family regained vacant possession of Siston. However it seems they had become accustomed to Olveston Court since it was in Olveston church that both Maurice Denys (d.1466) and his eldest son Sir Walter Denys (d.1506) were buried, in the middle of the choir (chancel) as the Denys monumental brass (dated 1505) in the church states. The brass states that they were each in succession lord of the manor of Alveston and Irdecote (Earthcott Green). Also probably born at Olveston Court was Maurice's 3rd. son Hugh Denys (d.1511), by his second wife Alice Poyntz, da. of Nicholas Poyntz of Iron Acton. Hugh Denys was Groom of the Stool to King Henry VII, an important figure in the management of the royal and national finances. Sir Walter Denys was by Katherine Stradling, da. of Sir Edward Stradling of St. Donat's Castle, Glamorgan, being therefore Hugh Denys's 1/2 brother. On the death of Sir Gilbert Denys in 1422, Stradling had obtained the valuable wardship and marriage of his 12-year-old heir Maurice, whom he had married off to his da. Katherine. Katherine appears to have died very soon after giving birth to Walter. Katherine's mother was Joan Beaufort, the illegitimate da. of Cardinal Henry Beaufort, Bishop of Winchester, a son of John of Gaunt, by Alice FitzAlan, da. of 11th. Earl of Arundel. Beaufort became a member of the regency government on the accession of his infant nephew as Henry VI in 1422. Stradling, probably through the influence of Beaufort, had obtained the licence to marry off his young nephew John Kemeys of Began, Monmouth, to Sir Gilbert Denys's widow, Margaret Russell. It was this latter marriage which forced the Denys family from Siston to reside at Olveston Court until Kemeys's death in 1477. The will of Sir Gilbert Denys appointed Henry Beaufort as an overseer, perhaps suggesting a connection from Gilbert's early military service under John of Gaunt. In his will Denys had requested his widow to take a vow of chastity, which clearly was made impossible by Sir Edward Stradling who had married her off to John Kemeys within 7 months of Gilbert's death.

== Non-conformist chapels ==
St. Mary's church parish register also includes details of births and burials of Quakers, who had a Meeting House in the village for nearly 200 years. Quakerism was introduced to the area by John Audland and John Camm in 1654. George Fox, founder of the Quakers, visited Olveston in the 1660s to help establish monthly meetings, and spent his honeymoon in the village in 1669. Forty of the 100 families in the area became Quakers.

The Quaker burial ground at Lower Hazel near the village, one of the oldest in England, was given Grade II listed status in 2025. It dates from 1656, and has seen continuous use.

Methodist chapels were built in Olveston (1820), Tockington (1840), Awkley (1856) and Old Down (1933).

== Colonial settlements named after Olveston ==
=== Montserrat, West Indies ===
Joseph Sturge (1793–1859), born in nearby Elberton, was a member of the Quaker Meeting. He purchased a plantation in Montserrat to demonstrate that slavery was unnecessary, and named it Olveston, now a village on the island.

=== New Zealand ===
An historic, early 20th century, house in the inner suburbs of Dunedin, New Zealand is named Olveston, after the place owner David Theomin had enjoyed his childhood holidays.

== Population and industry ==
The census of 1851 shows about 50 farms, and that the parish was mainly agricultural up to the time of World War II. The associated trades of blacksmith, saddler and carpenter etc. were supplemented by stonemasons and lime burners, there being good quality limestone in the parish. After the mechanisation of farming, and the growth of the aircraft industry at nearby Patchway and Filton, the parish gradually became a home for commuters. The area contains an ancient woodland, Wildacre, owned and managed by the Woodland Trust.

== Notable people ==
- Basil Harwood, organist of Ely Cathedral and Christ Church Cathedral, Oxford was born at Woodhouse, Olveston in 1859.
- Heather Standring (born 1928), illustrator
- David Theomin named his historic house Olveston, in Dunedin, New Zealand, after the village he enjoyed holidaying in as a child
- William Turton (1762–1835), medical doctor and naturalist
