= Tockington =

Village in Gloucestershire, England

Coordinates: 51.575904°N 2.564923°W

- Location within Gloucestershire
- OS grid reference: ST609864
- Unitary authority: South Gloucestershire
- Ceremonial county: Gloucestershire
- Region: South West
- Country: England
- Sovereign state: United Kingdom
- Post town: BRISTOL
- Postcode district: BS32
- Dialling code: 01454
- Police: Avon and Somerset
- Fire: Avon
- Ambulance: South Western
- UK Parliament: Thornbury and Yate

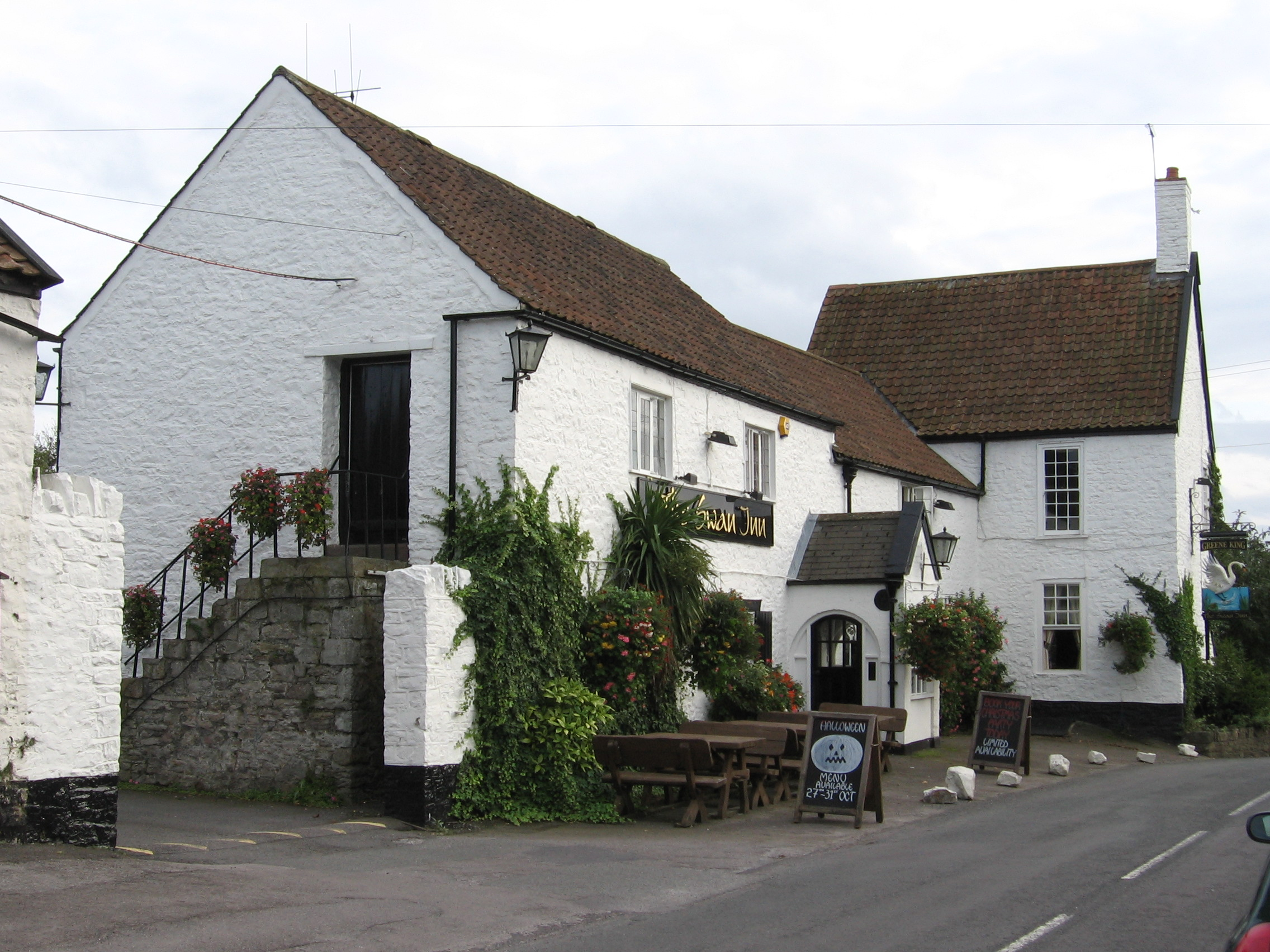
The Swan Inn

Tockington is a village in South Gloucestershire, England. Historically the village developed around farming based mainly on the rearing of cattle on the fertile flood plains. In more recent times Tockington has become an attractive location for commuters, being situated within the Green Belt and well connected with Bristol. It is south of Olveston and is located in a steep valley. The village also has the Swan Inn, a popular pub. The centre of the village, where the pub is located is a triangular junction.

== History ==
In 1870-72, John Marius Wilson's Imperial Gazetteer of England and Wales described Tockington like this:

TOCKINGTON (Lower), a tything in Almondsbury parish, Gloucester; 3¾ miles S by E of Thornbury. It has a post-office under Bristol, and cattle fairs on 9 May and 6 Dec. Real property, £4,975. Pop., 464. Houses, 109.

== Tockington Manor ==
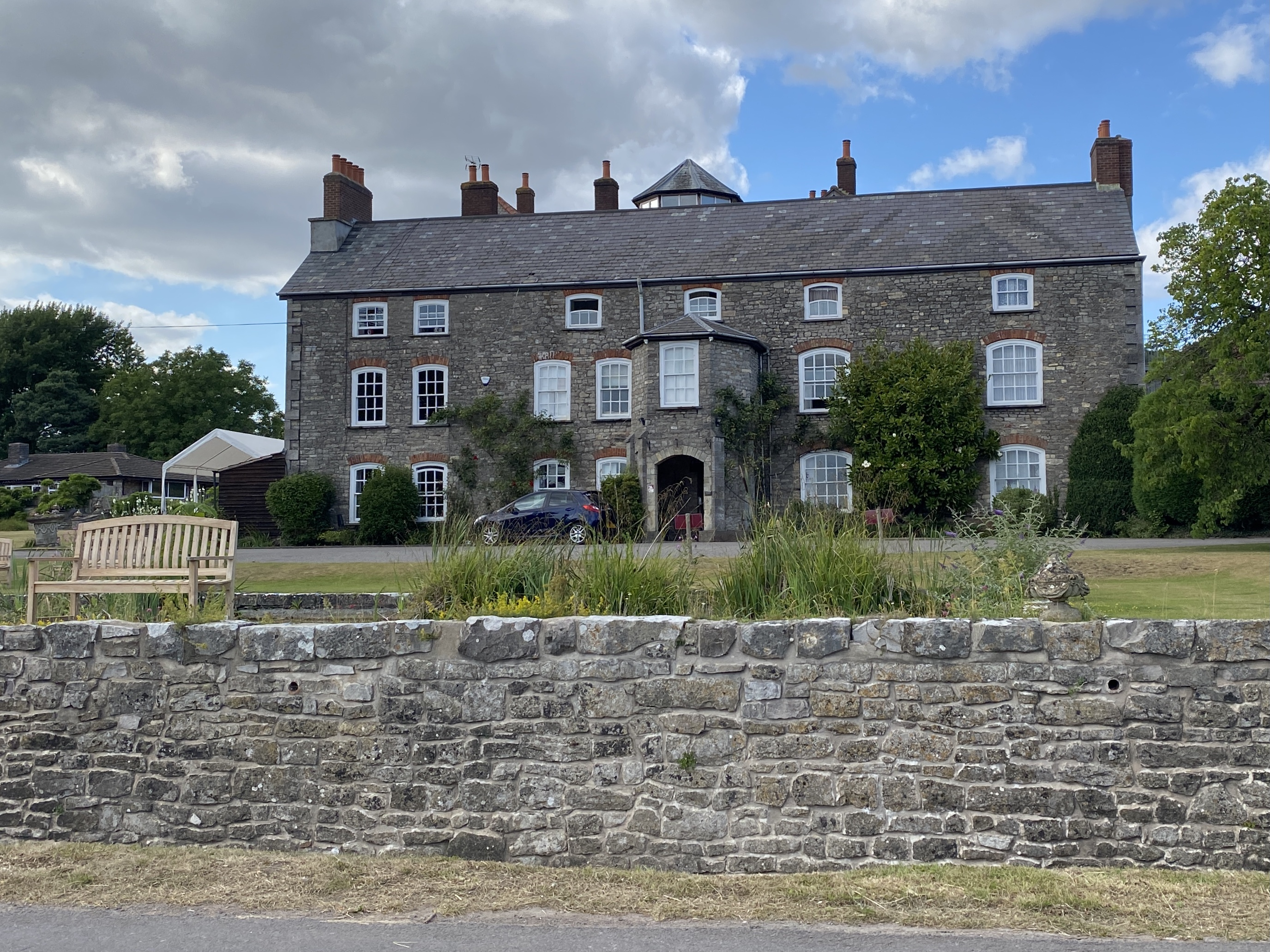
Tockington Manor

Tockington Manor is a boarding preparatory school, which opened in 1947. The three-storey stone building was largely constructed around 1712 but incorporating elements of an earlier house. It is a Grade II listed building.

In the First World War the house was used as a military hospital.

Before the Second World War it was privately owned by the Salmon family. At the outbreak of war it was commandeered as a dispersal site for the Bristol Engine Company's design office. The estimated cost, largely for building a number of additional huts in the grounds, of £9,000 was considered too much, so the main office staff were instead moved to the Fry's chocolate factory at Somerdale and only leading staff and their support staff, a total of 70, went to the Manor. Apartments were made for senior staff and after Roy Fedden, Bristol's chief designer, was coincidentally bombed out of his house in Bristol on 25 September 1940, during a raid targeted on Bristol's Filton factory, he took up permanent residence. Close House, Upper Tockington Road, was also used as a lodging house. The pre-war garden staff were kept on, now digging for victory to supply the kitchens.

The Tockington Manor office was where new engine developments were first planned. One of these had major significance, as Bristol's first gas turbine engine, the Theseus turboprop. This was a source of great disagreement, as Fedden thought that Bristol should concentrate on existing piston engines, but was over-ruled by Frank Owner, Head of the Project Office. This led to Fedden's resignation in 1942, at the height of the war.

Towards the end of the war, once the threat of air raids was over, the design office returned to Filton and afterwards the house was returned to the Salmon family. They sold the estate in 1946. The Manor was bought by ex first-class cricketer Gordon Tovey, who opened it as a private school. His son, Richard, later served as headmaster of the school for 38 years.

== Tockington Quarry ==
There is a small limestone quarry to the rear of the Manor. Along with the Manor this formed part of the pre-war Salmon estate. During the war, it was considered to use this quarry as an isolated and enclosed place for engine testing. In the end, Failand Quarry to the south-west was used instead. The quarry is now a climbing site.

== Amenities ==
The hub of the village is 'The Green' and where its church, pub and bus stop are all located. Next to the Swan Inn, a Grade II Listed Building, is an old style red phone box and which is used as a book swap.

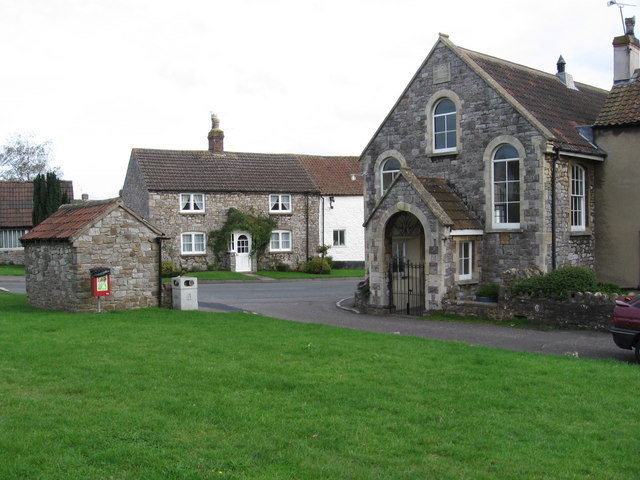
Methodist chapel in Tockington

The village church: Olveston and Tockington Methodist Church was formed in 2004 when the two former village churches united. The church, in the form of a chapel, was built in 1897. The chapel was extensively renovated in 2007 and now incorporates a toilet with disabled access and a kitchenette. At full capacity the chapel seats 60. Its minister from 1 September 2018 is the Rev Simon Edwards.

Tockington has no shops, but there are several farm shops in the surrounding area. There are also supermarkets and a large shopping mall at nearby Cribbs Causeway as well as those in the nearby town of Thornbury.

Bus services to and from Tockington are operated by Stagecoach Group Gloucester.
