= David Theomin =

David Edward Theomin (né David Ezekiel Benjamin, 25 April 1852 – 15 July 1933) was a New Zealand merchant, philanthropist and collector. He was born in Bristol, England, in 1852. One of his two children was Dorothy Michaelis Theomin.
