= Bristol Scout F =

Scout E and F
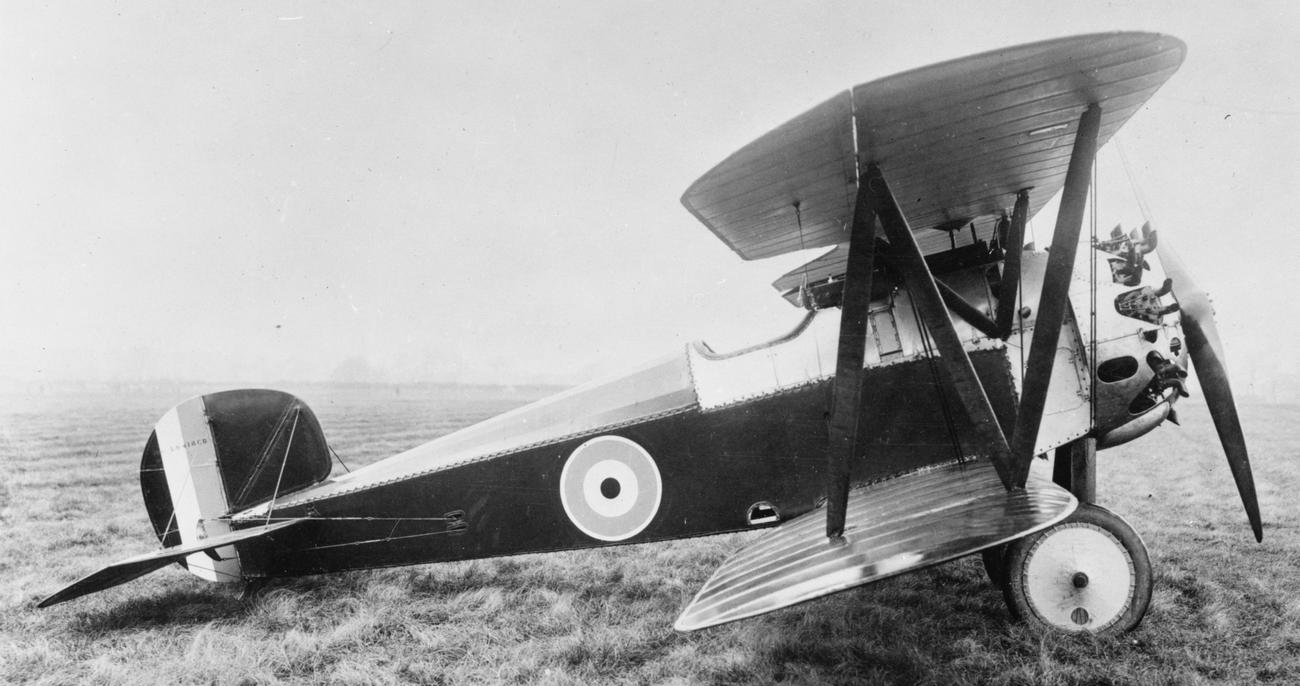

General information
- Type: Single-seat fighter
- National origin: United Kingdom
- Manufacturer: British and Colonial Aeroplane Co. Ltd.
- Designer: Frank Barnwell
- Number built: 4

History
- First flight: March 1918

The Bristol Scout E and F were a British single-seat biplane fighters built in 1916 to use newer and more powerful engines. It was initially powered by the Sunbeam Arab, but the third prototype was used as a testbed for the Cosmos Mercury, marking the start of Roy Fedden's association with the Bristol Aeroplane Company. The Armistice ended hopes of production.

== Development ==
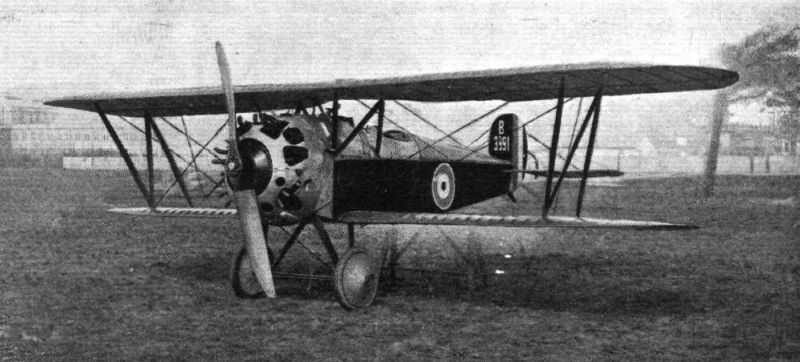

By the end of 1916 there was a shortage of suitably powerful engines for single-seat fighters needed for air superiority. One of the few available was the Hispano-Suiza 8, but it was unreliable and production was being absorbed by the need to power the Royal Aircraft Factory S.E.5A that was entering service. Frank Barnwell of the Bristol Aeroplane Company designed a single-seat biplane, called the Scout E, around a proposed 200 hp (150 kW) ten-cylinder water-cooled radial engine designed by Harry Ricardo and Frank Halford, but this failed to materialise and another powerplant was sought. The Company gained an Air Ministry contract for six aircraft and was promised some 200 hp (150 kW) Hispano-Suiza V8s, but by June 1917 these had been replaced by 200 hp (150 kW) Sunbeam ArabV8 engines. With the Arab engine the design was redesignated the Scout F.

The Scout F was a single-bay biplane with staggered unequal-span wings with straight edges and rounded tips. Ailerons were carried only on the upper planes and there were smooth cutouts in both to improve the view from the open cockpit, placed just behind the trailing edge. The tail was conventional, with unbalanced control surfaces. The Scout F had a fuselage-mounted single-axle main undercarriage forward of the lower wing, plus a tailskid. The water-cooled V-8 Arab engine allowed a smooth and quite short installation, ending in a two-blade propeller and conical spinner. There was a small bulge on top of the cowling for the coolant header tank and the radiator was placed in a tunnel fairing between the undercarriage legs, with a pair of shutters for coolant temperature control.

Persistent vibrations dogged the Arab and a decision was made to use it only in the first two Scout Fs, the first of which first flew in March 1918. It was fast, achieving 138 mph (222 km/h) at sea level, and could climb to 10,000 ft (3,050 m) in 9.5 min. The second was flown by experienced pilots at the Central Flying School, amongst them Oliver Stuart who judged it a better aerobatic airplane than the SE5a.

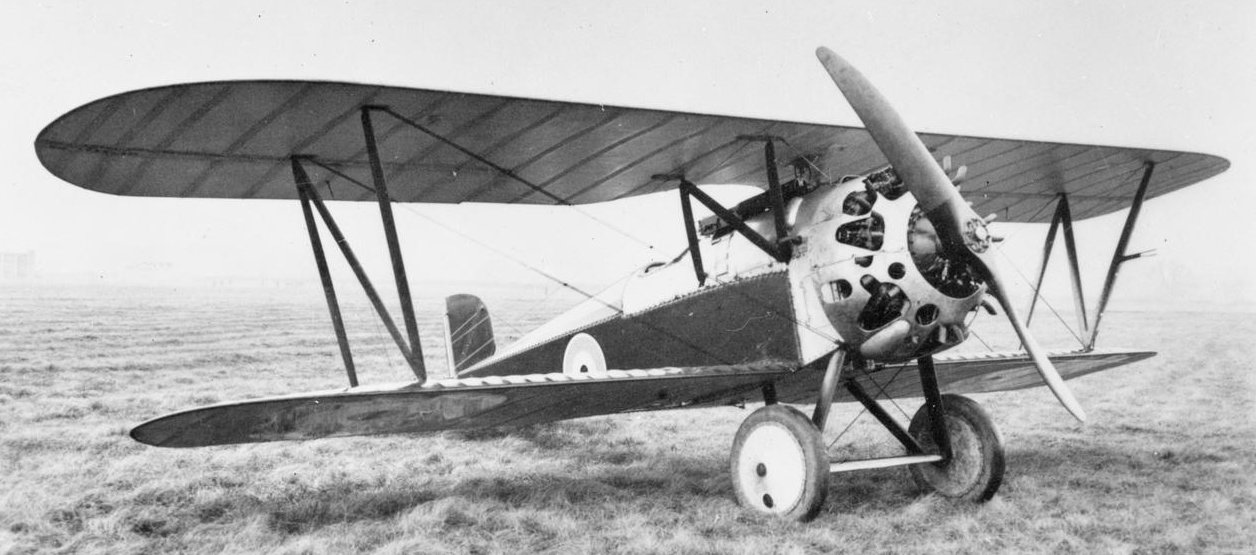
Cosmos Mercury-powered Bristol Scout F

At this point Barnwell was approached by Roy Fedden of the Cosmos Engineering company based in the Bristol suburb of Fishponds. Fedden wanted to find a suitable airframe to test the 315 hp (235 kW) Cosmos Mercury radial engine which he was developing, and it was decided to fit the third machine with this engine. It was installed inside a low-drag cowling with exposed cylinder heads, making the aircraft 10 in (250 mm) shorter than the Arab-powered machines. The weight went up by 60 lb (27 kg). In this form it was known as the Scout F.1 and it was first flown on 6 September 1918. The greater power produced a slightly higher top speed and a much better rate of climb.

The third Scout F was the last to fly, although a fourth aircraft was built as a spare airframe. The Armistice brought an end to the Mercury contract, the cancellation of the two outstanding Scout Fs, and the abandonment of hopes of its production.

== Specifications (Mercury-powered Bristol Scout F) ==
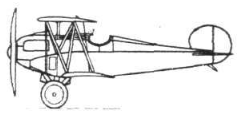

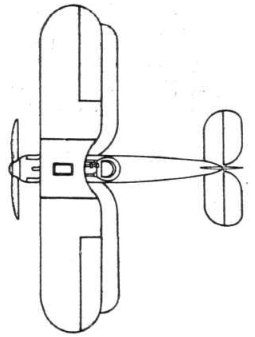
Line drawings of Bristol Scout E

Data from Barnes 1970, p. 133

General characteristics

- Crew: One
- Length: 20 ft 0 in (6.10 m)
- Upper wingspan: 29 ft 7 in (9.02 m)
- Height: 8 ft 4 in (2.54 m)
- Wing area: 260 sq ft (24 m^{2})
- Empty weight: 1,440 lb (653 kg)
- Gross weight: 2,260 lb (1,025 kg)
- Powerplant: 1 × Cosmos Mercury 14-cylinder air-cooled radial engine, 315 hp (235 kW)
- Propellers: 2-bladed wooden fixed pitch propeller

Performance

- Maximum speed: 145 mph (233 km/h, 126 kn) at sea level
- Rate of climb: 1,850 ft/min (9.4 m/s) to 10,000 ft (3,000 m)

Armament

- Guns: *2 × 0.303 in (7.7 mm) Vickers machine guns
