= Cosmos Mercury =

1910s British radial aircraft engine

Mercury
- The Cosmos Mercury
- Type: Radial aero engine
- Manufacturer: Cosmos Engineering; Brazil Straker
- Designer: Roy Fedden
- First run: July 1917
- Major applications: Bristol Scout F

The Cosmos Mercury was a fourteen-cylinder twin-row air-cooled radial aeroengine. Designed by Roy Fedden of Cosmos Engineering, it was built in the United Kingdom in 1917. It produced 347 horsepower (259 kW). It did not enter production; a large order was cancelled due to the Armistice.

== Design and development ==
Built at Bristol by Brazil-Straker under the direction of Roy Fedden, the Mercury featured an unusual crankshaft and connecting rod arrangement that dispensed with the more normal design of a single master rod linking to individual rods for each cylinder. It was said to run well without vibration and set an unofficial time to climb record while fitted to a Bristol 21A Scout F.1, the aircraft achieving 10,000 ft (3,000 m) in 5.4 minutes and 20,000 ft (6,000 m) in 16.25 minutes.

An Admiralty order for 200 engines was placed in 1917 but was later cancelled by Lord Weir due to the end of World War I, it is also stated that Lord Weir had a preference for the ABC Dragonfly.

The name was re-used by Fedden for the later nine-cylinder Bristol Mercury radial engine.

== Applications ==
- Bristol Scout F

== Specifications (Mercury) ==
Data from Lumsden.

=== General characteristics ===
- Type: 14-cylinder air-cooled two-row radial engine
- Bore: 4.375 in (111 mm)
- Stroke: 5.8 in (147.6 mm)
- Displacement: 1,223 cu in (20 L)

=== Components ===
- Valvetrain: 2 valves per cylinder, poppet valve
- Fuel type: Petrol
- Cooling system: Air-cooled

=== Performance ===
- Power output: 347 hp (259 kW) at 2,000 rpm at sea level
- Compression ratio: 5.3:1

== See also ==
Comparable engines

- Armstrong Siddeley Jaguar
- Gnome-Rhône 14M
- Pratt & Whitney R-1535 Twin Wasp Junior

Related lists

- List of aircraft engines
