= Parnall & Sons =

UK business

Parnall & Sons Limited
- Company type: Private
- Industry: Engineering
- Founded: 1820
- Founder: William Parnall
- Fate: Acquired by George Adlam & Sons
- Headquarters: Bristol, England

Parnall & Sons Limited was a shop and ship fitting and aircraft component manufacturer in Bristol, England. The original company was set up in 1820 by William Parnall in Narrow Wine Street, initially making weights and measures, before expanding into shop keeping equipment and shop fittings.

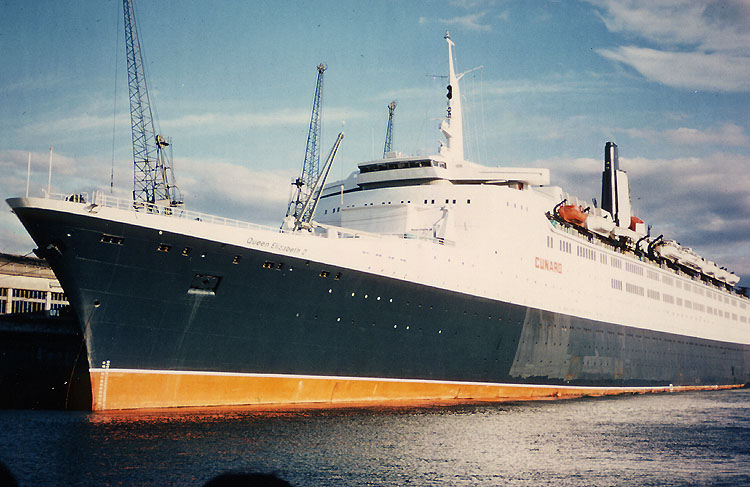
The public room outfit on the liner Queen Elizabeth 2 was undertaken by Parnall & Sons of Fishponds

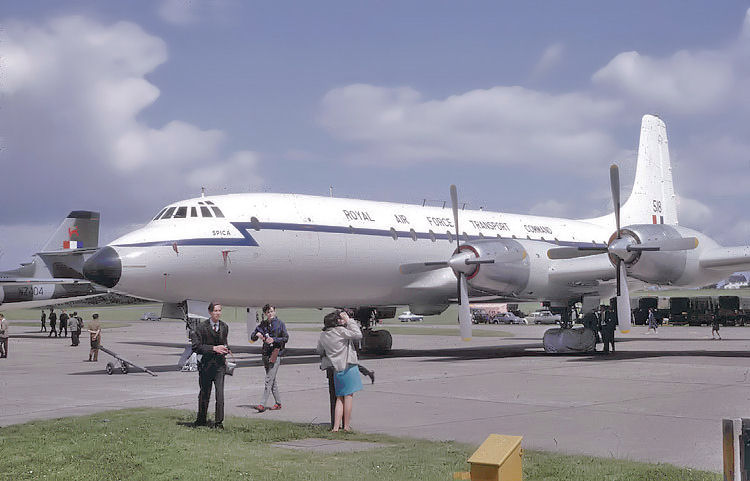
Parnall & Sons manufactured the interior of Bristol Britannia airliners

By the 1880s Parnall & Sons was the largest shop fitting company in England with showrooms in Narrow Wine Street and Fairfax Street, a scale works at Fishponds and branches in London and Swansea. The scales and weighing machines produced at the Fishponds foundry on Parnall Road included the hardy Patent Agate Hand Scales and the Patent National Balances invented by Mr Parnall, which sold 20,000 in 10 years. In 1889 the company expanded into shopfronts, including glasswork and iron architecture and had over 400 employees. By the 1890s "there is hardly a city or town in Great Britain where their productions are not known and appreciated". Weighing machine production was phased out after W & T Avery was associated and the company concentrated on its well-known shop-front business. The foundry was later sold to George Adlam & Sons the iron founders and brewers engineers.

During World War I, the company started manufacture of aeroplanes and seaplanes, producing over 600 by 1918. George Parnall left the company soon afterwards, who eventually went on to form Parnall and successfully continued aircraft design and manufacture elsewhere in Bristol.

== Between the wars ==
In 1923, Parnall & Sons moved to Lodge Causeway, Fishponds, in Bristol into a former factory of the Cosmos Engineering aeroengines company. The company resumed manufacture of shopfronts, including the bronze shopfronts and display cases in Piccadilly Circus tube station and steel canopies at the Savoy Hotel and the Shakespeare Memorial Theatre in Stratford-on-Avon.

High-profile work included the internal fittings for passenger liners, including the outfit of the Tourist class dining room on the RMS Britannic built at Harland & Wolff for the White Star Line in the late 1920s. In addition they also branched out into refrigerated and cold storage units, executive office furniture, and gained expertise in the fabrication of plastics leading to the formation of a plastics division.

== The Second World War ==
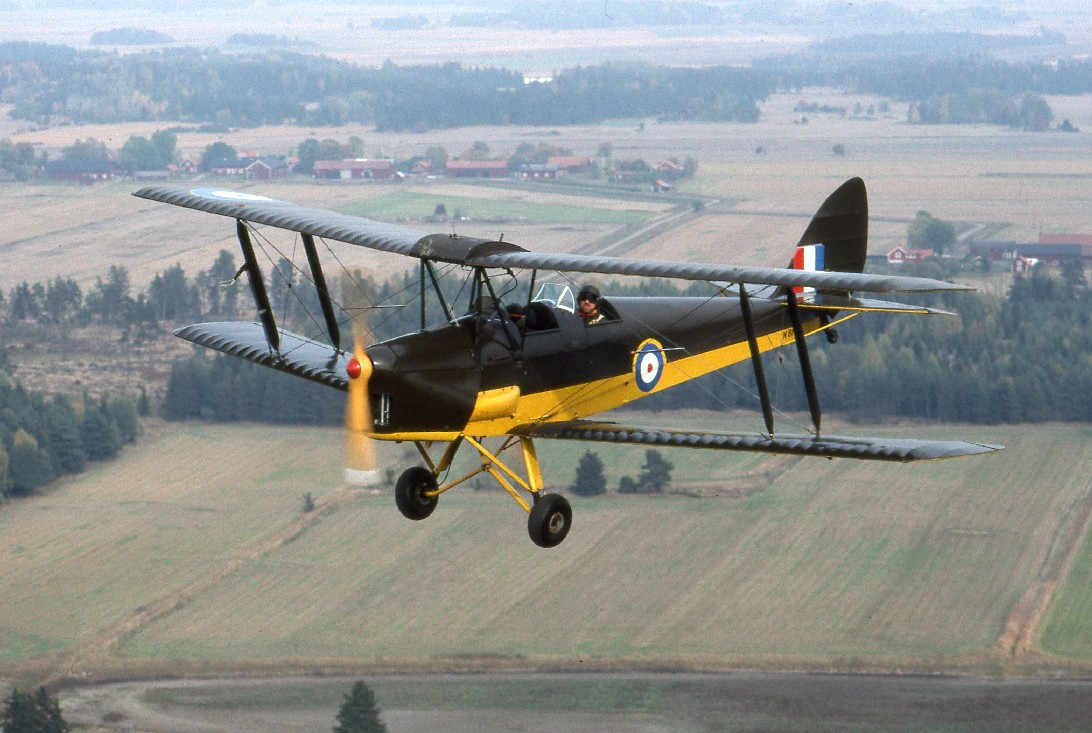
Tiger Moth wings were built by Parnall & Sons

Once again the Air Ministry turned to the company for aircraft manufacturing, and the factory in Fishponds produced airframe components and fuselage sections in metal and wood for a range of Royal Air Force and Federal Aviation Administration aircraft.

Manufacture throughout the war years included wings for De Havilland Tiger Moth and Airspeed Oxford trainers, wing flaps for Fairey Barracuda torpedo-bombers and Handley Page Halifax heavy bombers, fuselages for Shorts Stirling heavy bombers and Airspeed Horsa gliders, and tail planes for Bristol Beaufighter heavy fighter.

== Post war ==
Similar aircraft component work also continued after the war with contracts for the manufacture of fuselages in the late 1940s and 50s for the de Havilland Venom, a jet single-seat fighter-bomber. Work continued with interior finishings for Bristol Britannia airliners up until 1960, which then exploited the new materials available, such as plastic. In the late 1940s, the company turned its hand to supplying the new supermarket industry, producing metal shelving and display units.

Fittings contracts continued in the luxury market including contracts for 10 Downing Street, Buckingham Palace, the Houses of Parliament. Most famous of all was the production and installation of the internal fittings for public rooms on board the Cunard Ocean Liner Queen Elizabeth 2 in the 1960s.

In 1979, Parnall & Sons was bought by GEC, who subsequently sold the company to CH Holdings. The factory suffered a couple of fires and the company went into receivership in May 1991 after over 170 years of trading in Bristol.

The factory was demolished in 1992 and the site is now occupied by ALD Automotive car retailers.
