= Lodge Hill =

Lodge Hill may refer to several places in England:

- Lodge Hill, Bristol, a residential area
- Lodge Hill, Cornwall, a village
- Lodge Hill Camp, part of the Chattenden and Lodge Hill Military Camps, a former military site which is now a Site of Special Scientific Interest
- Lodge Hill Cemetery, Birmingham, a cemetery and crematorium in Selly Oak, Birmingham
- Lodge Hill, Ditchling, East Sussex, a hill in Ditchling, East Sussex
