= Avonside Locomotive Works =

The Avonside Locomotive Works was a locomotive manufacturer on Filwood Road, Fishponds, Bristol, England. A nearby locomotive builder was Peckett and Sons located on Deep Pit Road between Fishponds and St George.

== The new company ==
The original Avonside Engine Company was based in St Philips, Bristol, and founded in 1837 as Henry Stothert and Company. This firm had got into financial difficulties and was liquidated in the 1880s. A new company was formed using the Avonside name as the Avonside Locomotive Works, initially at St Philips, before the company moved to Fishponds in 1905. The capital for the new factory in Fishponds was provided by Ronald Murray, and the facility was set up to build 16 locomotives a year. The company used the shunting line into Fishponds railway station and onto the Midland line in order to get their engines onto the mainline and onto their customers.

== Locomotive production ==
In 1882 Avonside made the first of the unusual Guinness-designed locomotives for shunting in their brewery either on the narrow gauge, or in converter bogies on the standard gauge. The engine was a success, but the remainder were built by William Spence in Dublin.

The company carried on the previous firm's policy of concentrating on smaller engine types of various gauges, and saw some success in exporting their locomotives all over the world as far afield as South America. One such customer was the Guaqui–La Paz Railway in Bolivia. Other engines built for overseas included a Heisler locomotive, developed for use on sugar estates in hot climes. Closer to home, locomotives were supplied to the War Department in 1915, fitted with Parsons four-cylinder internal combustion engines. The 0-4-0 type was popular, Cadburys of Bournville ordered an 0-4-0T in 1926 and the Great Western Railway were supplied with six 0-4-0Ts in the 1920s.

The Avonside Locomotive Works was badly affected by the 1930s Great Depression and went into voluntary liquidation in November 1934. The Fishponds plant and buildings were sold off in 1935 and the goodwill, drawing and patterns purchased by the Hunslet Engine Company.

== Surviving Fishponds-built Avonside locomotives ==
Several Fishponds-built Avonside locomotives remain, including:

- Avonside 0-6-0ST, built in 1918 for the Avonmouth Imperial Smelting Works. It was retired in 1972 and purchased by the Avon Valley Railway where it is currently being restored. It now carries the name "Edwin Hulse".
- None of the former GWR Avonside 0-4-0T (1101 Class) survived, but a similar loco, built for Cadbury, is on display at Tyseley Locomotive Works
- 600 mm (1 ft 11 5/8 in) gauge Heisler-type articulated, geared 0-4-4-0T privately owned by Peter Rampton. Not on public display.
- Elidir a 1 ft 10 3/4 in (578 mm) 0-4-0T, one of Avonside's last locomotives built in 1933. Returned from preservation in Canada in 2006 and is now at the Leighton Buzzard Light Railway
- Avonside 1563/1908 is a standard gauge 0-4-0ST under restoration at the Foxfield Light Railway
- Avonside 0-6-0ST (works no. 1764) "Portbury", built 1917 for the Inland Waterways and Docks (War Department). Acquired by Bristol Corporation Docks after the war and numbered S3. Donated to Bristol Museums she was restored to running condition in 1988. She is now in her original IW & D grey livery, No. 34.

Avonside locomotives preserved in Bolivia include:

- Avonside #2049 from 1930, 1,000 mm (3 ft 3 3/8 in) metre gauge, 2-8-0 FCG #8. Today she's static at Guaqui Locomotive Shed in Guaqui. Her wheels, cylinders and the frontal parts of its frame are missing.

== See also ==
- Avonside Engine Company
