= Fishponds =

Suburb of Bristol, England

Coordinates: 51.4805°N 2.5241°W

- Location within Bristol
- Population: 37,575
- OS grid reference: ST637758
- Unitary authority: Bristol
- Ceremonial county: Bristol
- Region: South West
- Country: England
- Sovereign state: United Kingdom
- Post town: BRISTOL
- Postcode district: BS16
- Dialling code: 0117
- Police: Avon and Somerset
- Fire: Avon
- Ambulance: South Western
- UK Parliament: Bristol North East

Fishponds is a suburb in the north-east of the English city of Bristol, about 3 miles (5 km) from the city centre. It is mainly residential, and housing is typically terraced Victorian. It has a small student population from the presence of the Glenside campus of the University of the West of England.

Fishponds is home to Oldbury Court, a Victorian landscaped park. The River Frome runs through the area with the Frome Valley Walkway alongside it. A restored mill found at Snuff Mills has kept its original waterwheel, which can still be seen and heard turning. To the south-west of the neighbourhood is Eastville Park.

The name Fishponds derives from former quarries which upon abandonment became large fishponds.

== Transport ==
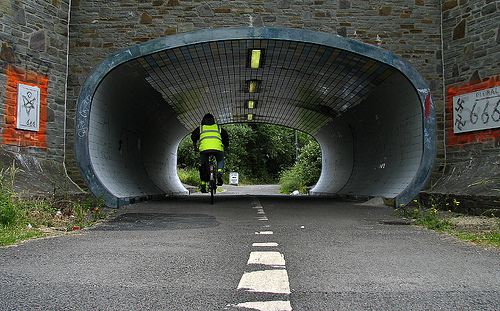
The Bristol and Bath cycle path passes under Filwood Road, Fishponds, Bristol.

Fishponds is mainly served by First West of England buses 46, 47x, 48/48x, 49/49x, 17, 25, and with 6 & 7 serving the outskirts.

Fishponds railway station opened in 1866 and closed in 1965. It included a shunting line for Fishponds-built locomotives of the Avonside Locomotive Works to join the main line. The Bristol & Bath Railway Path now runs down the old line, and can be accessed at several points in Fishponds.

The Bristol Tramway operated from Old Market to Fishponds tram terminus from 1897 to 1941. The suburb, like most of eastern Bristol, is currently not served by rail. The two nearest stations are Stapleton Road and Ashley Down.

== Local government ==
For elections to Bristol City Council, most of Fishponds is in the Frome Vale electoral ward. Southern parts are in the Hillfields ward and western parts are in the Eastville ward.

== Demography ==
Neighbourhoods in Fishponds include Chester Park and Mayfield Park. Fishponds is bordered by Downend, Staple Hill, St. George, Eastville and Stapleton. At the 2011 census the Greater Fishponds area had a population of 37,575.

2011 Ethnic Groups	Fishponds	Bristol
White British	69.3%	77.9%
Asian	10.4%	5.5%
Black	8.8%	6.0%

== History ==
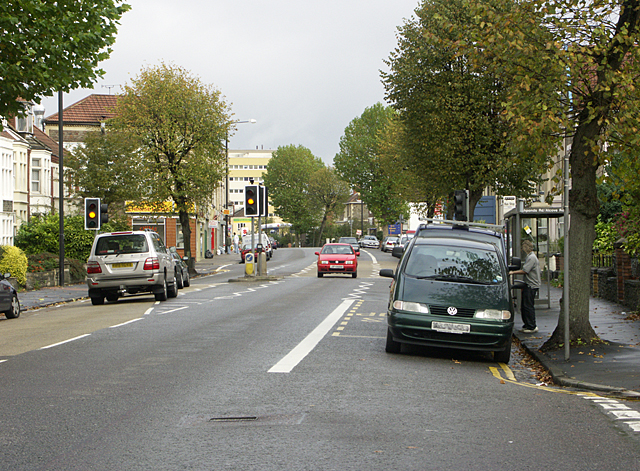
Fishponds Road

The area of Fishponds was once covered by the Royal Forest of Kingswood. The forest was progressively reduced and developed over the centuries, with Fishponds first recorded as the "Newe Pooles" in 1610, and subsequently "Fish Ponds" by 1734. By the 17th century it was a thriving village with numerous stone-built cottages for miners and quarrymen for coal and pennant stone.

The village grew up around the two pools formed from the old quarries, but both were filled in by 1839. One remains and was a popular swimming area nicknamed "The Lido". It operated in the 1930s, and reopened in the 1960s marketed as "Bristol's island in the sun" with two houseboats as fully licensed floating pubs offering catering and dancing facilities. In the 1970s most of the site was sold off for housing and the deep ponds became an angling club, now called Alcove Angling Club.

During the mid-to-late 19th century, Fishponds established a large manufacturing industry along Lodge Causeway and Filwood Road. Clay Hill trading estate, with many small and medium sized factories and industrial units, was developed circa 1955.

=== Engineering and railway ===
Fishponds has been the site of several metal foundries, including George Adlam & Sons founded in the 1830s and Parnall & Sons, a foundry and scale works to manufacture of weights, measures and shop fittings. The company would later fit out ocean liner passenger compartments on the RMS Britannic in 1929 and the famous QE2 in the 1960s.

The railway was built through Fishponds in 1835 and later included a shunting line for locomotives of the Avonside Locomotive Works to join the main line. Peckett and Sons also built locomotives at the Atlas Works towards Speedwell, whose engines joined the line at Clay Hill, until the firm closed in 1961.

=== Chocolates and confectionery ===
From 1894 Palmer Bros biscuit and cake manufacturers had two sites in Fishponds Road, including a factory that is now part of the City Glass Company. Webers chocolates in Goodneston Road opened in 1914 and produced chocolates for 50 years, having had production lines alongside Oerlikon 20 mm cannons in World War II.

=== Automobile and aircraft manufacturing ===
Straker-Squire opened a large factory on Lodge Causeway in 1906, and was a major producer of early London Buses, with the factory in Fishponds supplying 70 per cent of them by 1909. It also produced trucks and successfully raced a number of its car designs, including the 2.8-litre 15, dubbed 'PDQ' (Pretty Damn Quick), which in 1912 took the 15 hp (11 kW) flying mile record at Brooklands over 95 miles per hour (153 km/h). The firm moved to London in 1919.

The aeronautics industry arrived in Fishponds in 1914 when Brazil Straker on Lodge Causeway began building Rolls-Royce aircraft engines for the RFC in World War I. (Note: Rolls-Royce Hawk engines, components for the Eagle and also Renault 80hp 8Ca engines.) Cosmos Engineering bought the firm and Roy Fedden designed the Cosmos Mercury engine before the company was forced into bankruptcy and then taken over by the Bristol Aeroplane Company in 1920. The site was later acquired by Parnall & Sons, which from 1941 produced aircraft components for a range of RAF aircraft, including wings for De Havilland Tiger Moths and fuselages for Short Stirling bombers.

Post-war, Parnall & Sons continued manufacturing aircraft interiors and fuselages until about 1960. Today, Diamonite Aircraft Furnishings on Goodneston Road supplies some of the world's best aircraft interiors, including one for the Russian president Vladimir Putin.

=== Pottery, paper and printing ===
Pountney & Co moved to Fishponds in 1905 and opened a large factory on Lodge Causeway. It had an entirely new labour-saving design and produced a range of domestic and luxury ceramics that were exported across the world. The Royal Cauldron name was acquired in 1962, but by then the factory was suffering from lack of investment and it became insolvent in 1971. The factory was later pulled down; the site is now occupied by the Lodge Causeway Trading Estate.

E. S. & A. Robinson opened a large cardboard-box factory at Filwood Road in 1922. A subsidiary, Robinson's Waxed Paper Co. Ltd, built a new factory across the road in 1929. In World War II the company produced aircraft components for the Bristol Aeroplane Company. Robinson's merged to become the Dickinson Robinson Group in 1966 and finally closed, after further takeovers and mergers, in 1996. The two sites are now owned by Graphic Packaging and Zanetti & Company Ltd stone and marble masons, whose products and floors appear in airports, shops and railway stations throughout the UK.

== Facilities ==
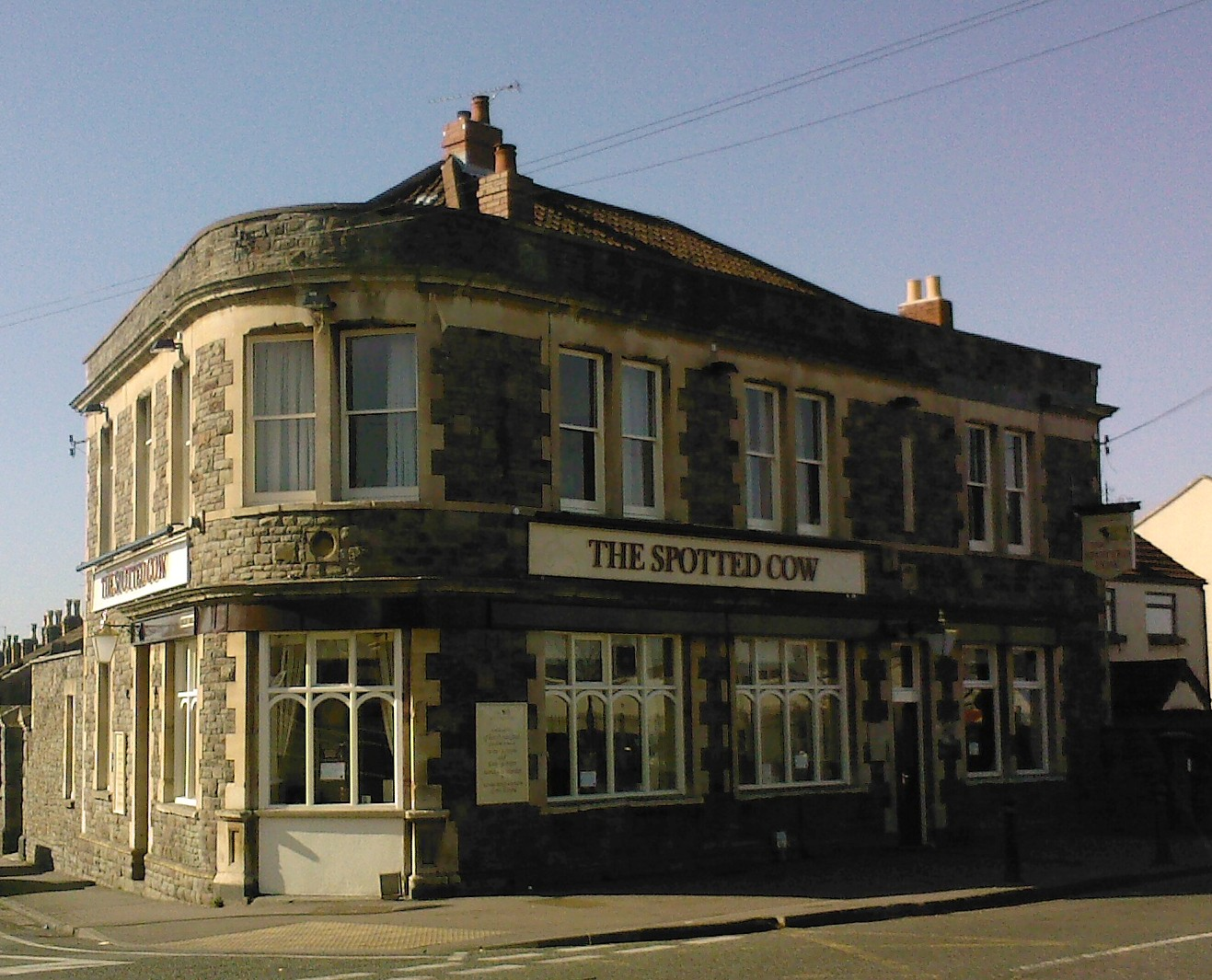
The Spotted Cow pub on Lodge Causeway, Fishponds.

The high street shops include an international supermarket, Asian food store, charity shops, takeaways and Lidl, Aldi and Morrisons supermarkets.

There are 16 pubs in Fishponds, most of them dating from the Victorian era. Two are modern conversions: the Old Post Office; and the VanDyke, built as a 1200-seat cinema in 1926 but closed in 1973. The Star (built in 1853), was once the headquarters of Bristol Rovers football club when they played as the Black Arabs in the 1890s.

Others include the Farriers Arms, now closed and boarded up (built 1872), Railway Tavern (built 1867), Fishponds Tavern, converted into two houses (built 1904), Full Moon, now the Crafty Egg (built 1850), Golden Lion (built 1883), Cross Keys now closed (built 1853), Cross Hands, now the All Inn (built 1853), Old Tavern now closed (built 1899), Greyhound (built 1883), Spotted Cow (built 1883), Portcullis, now the Fishponds Tap (built 1853), Warwick Arms (built 1906), and Oldbury Court (built 1957). Most are along the Fishponds Road running from Downend and Staple Hill in the north down towards Eastville in the south.

== Notable people ==
- Hannah More (1745–1833), a religious writer, philanthropist, poet and playwright.
- William Yalland (1889–1914), an English cricketer, he died in World War I.
- Gordon Welchman (1906–1985), cryptanalyst and mathematician. Played an important part in the World War II codebreaking at Bletchley Park.
- Roy Evans (born 1930), actor appeared on British TV from the 1960s to 2004.
- David Smith (1934–2003), a cricketer, played in five Tests for England in India, 1961–1962.
- Roger Greenaway OBE (born 1938), a singer, songwriter and record producer.
- Roger Cook (born 1940), a singer, songwriter and record producer.
