= Webers of Fishponds =

Erstwhile chocolate company

Webers of Fishponds was a chocolate company in Fishponds, Bristol.

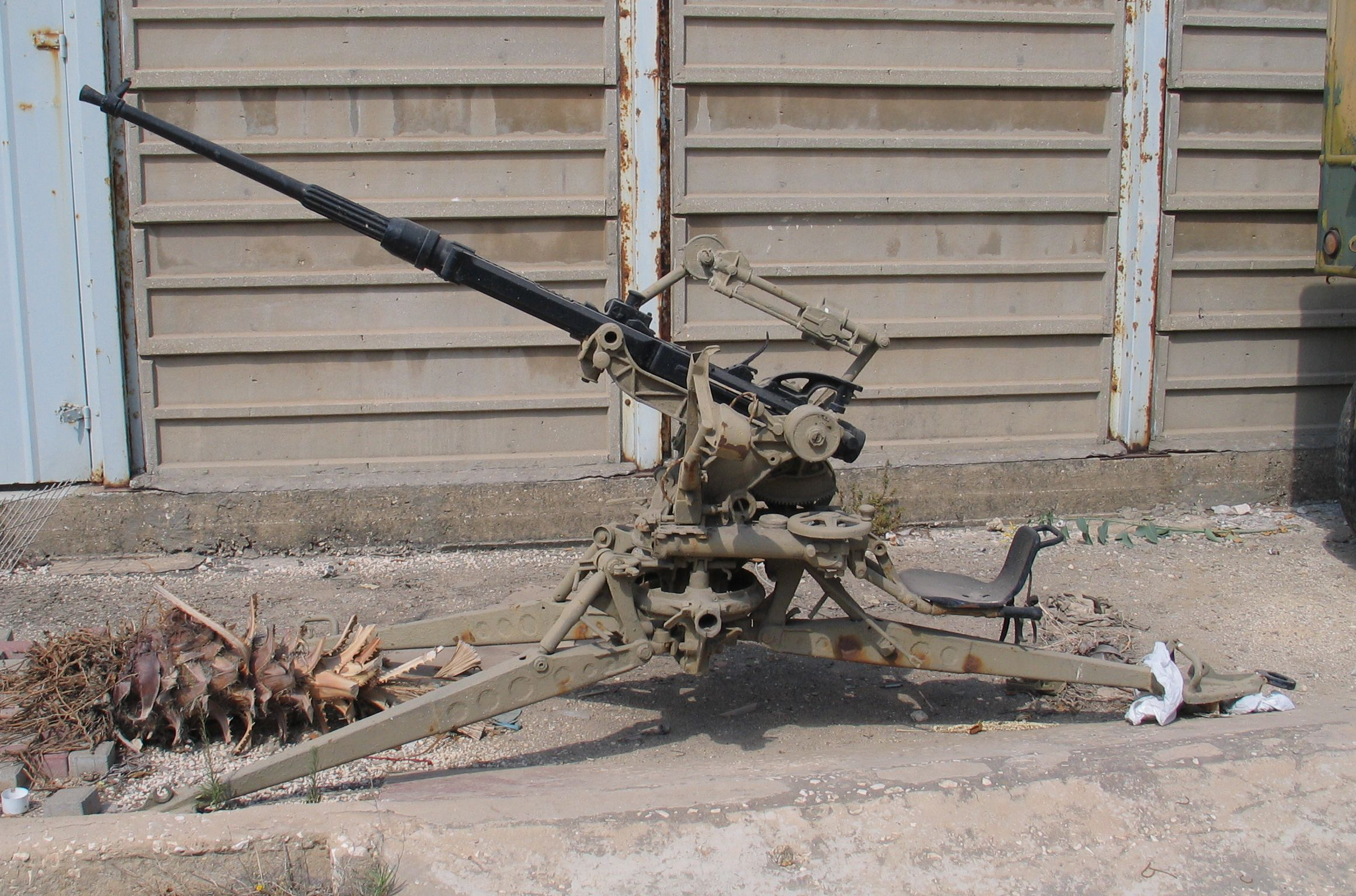
During WW2 Webers of Fishponds produced Oerlikon 20mm cannons

The Swiss chocolatier Mr Weber opened his chocolate factory on Goodneston Road, in Fishponds, in 1914 and joined the well established Bristol chocolate industry which included Fry's, Carsons and Cadburys. The chocolate range included dark chocolate. Mr Weber was a noted radio enthusiast and early radio broadcaster.

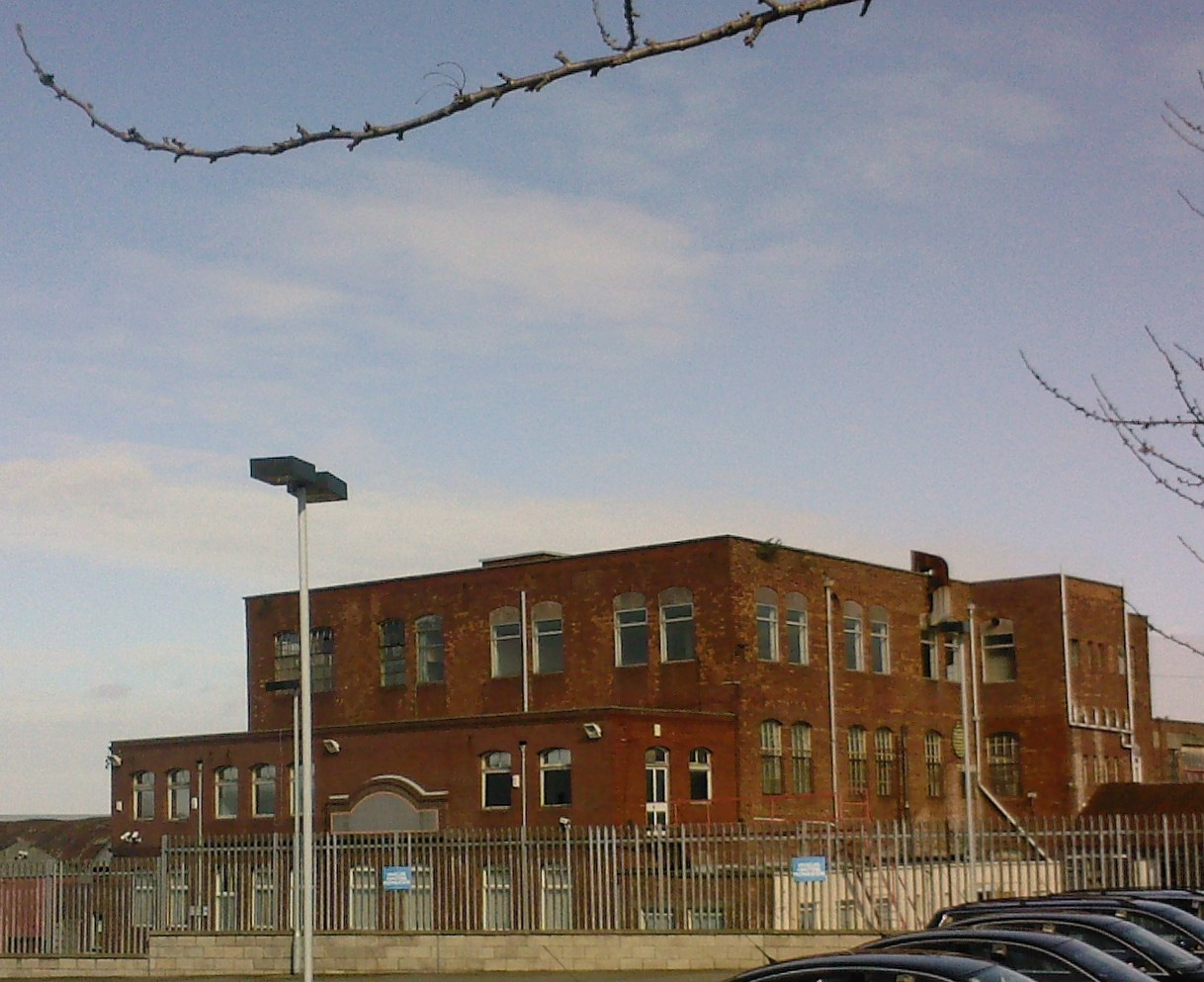
The former Webers factory

In 1941 the factory was taken over by Thrissells Engineering and by January 1942 they were manufacturing breech casings and barrels for Oerlikon 20mm cannons. At its peak the factory employed 420 wartime staff who produced over 5,300 guns during World War II, and it is said they accounted for 1,026 enemy aircraft. A limited amount of chocolate production continued alongside the gun manufacturing line.

After the war, Mr Weber's son took over the running of the factory until it closed in 1964. The site is now owned by Diamonite Aircraft Furnishings.
