= Fedden car =

The Fedden car (or F-car) was a British automobile produced after the Second World War by Roy Fedden Ltd. It was never manufactured.

Designed by Roy Fedden, assisted by Alex Moulton, Ian Duncan, Peter Ware, and Gordon Wilkins, the styling resembled the contemporary Jowett Javelin, with a sloping rear, four doors, seating for six, and rear spats. The design drew inspiration from the Volkswagen Type 1, including the rear-mounted engine and rear swing axle suspension. The car was powered by a horizontally mounted 1,100 cc (67 cu in) sleeve valve three-cylinder air-cooled radial engine, which had the carburettor between the rear window and the passenger compartment. The engine sat over the torque converter and rear axle, which contributed to a high center of gravity and a tendency to skid.

Of monocoque construction, the F-car was assembled in three distinct sections, each joined with four bolts. Intended to simplify repairs, it left the car with "a somewhat industrial feel". There were also issues with vibration, overheating, and a tendency to skid, doubtless exacerbated by the swing axle, which was unfamiliar to British drivers; the same issue arose in connection with the Chevrolet Corvair. (In testing, the company's test driver Alec Caine suffered a serious wreck due to the engine's pendulum effect.)

Only a single prototype was built. The F-car never entered production, as the company, Roy Fedden Limited, went into liquidation in April 1947.

The prototype later disappeared, reportedly being stored in a shed at the Cranfield Aeronautical College in the 1960s.

== Sources ==
- Christopher, John. The Race for Hitler's X-Planes. The Mill, Gloucestershire: History Press, 2013.
