= Straker-Squire =

Automobile manufacturer

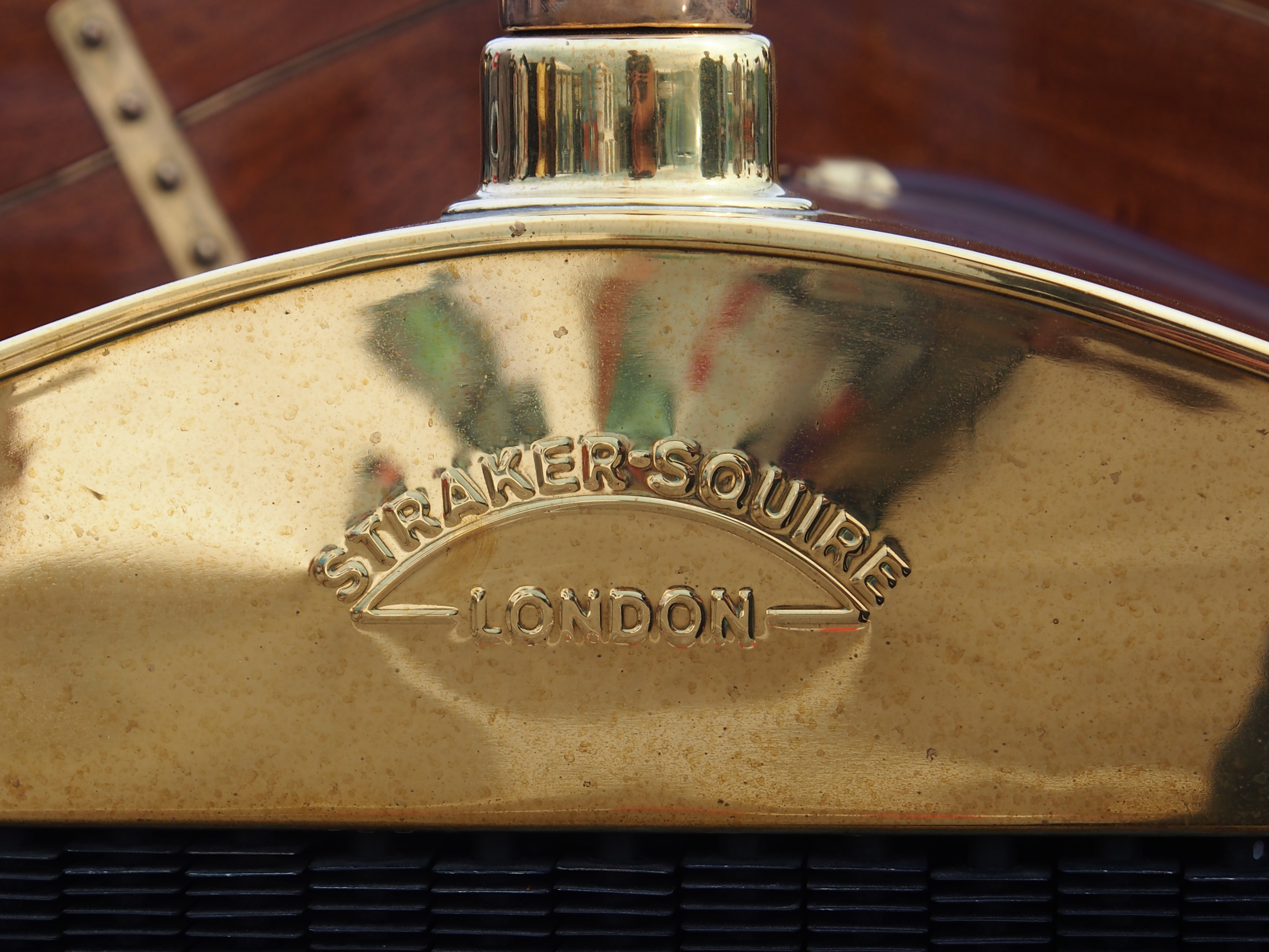

Straker-Squire (also known as Brazil Straker) was a British automobile manufacturer based in Bristol, and later Edmonton in North London.

The company was formed in 1893 at St Philips, Bristol, as Brazil, Straker & Co by the Irish engineer J.P. Brazil and the London motor agent Sidney Straker. In 1899 Sidney Straker joined forces with Edward Bayley and went into production of steam wagons, joining in partnership with L.R.L. Squire in 1904 and production reached 200 steam wagons by 1906.

In 1907 the company moved into a new factory on Lodge Causeway, Fishponds, at first to manufacture commercial vehicles, including large numbers of early London Buses, and a French car design under licence. The company also produced and successfully raced a number of its own car designs.

Straker-Squire share certificate from 1917

When World War I started, Sir Roy Fedden, their chief designer, convinced the company to take on aircraft engine repair and manufacture, and that arm of the company was taken over by Cosmos Engineering in 1918. The company built staff cars and lorries during the war and afterwards, all production moved to Edmonton in North London in 1919. Car production continued until 1926 and Sidney Straker was killed in a hunting accident not long afterwards.

== Steam wagons ==
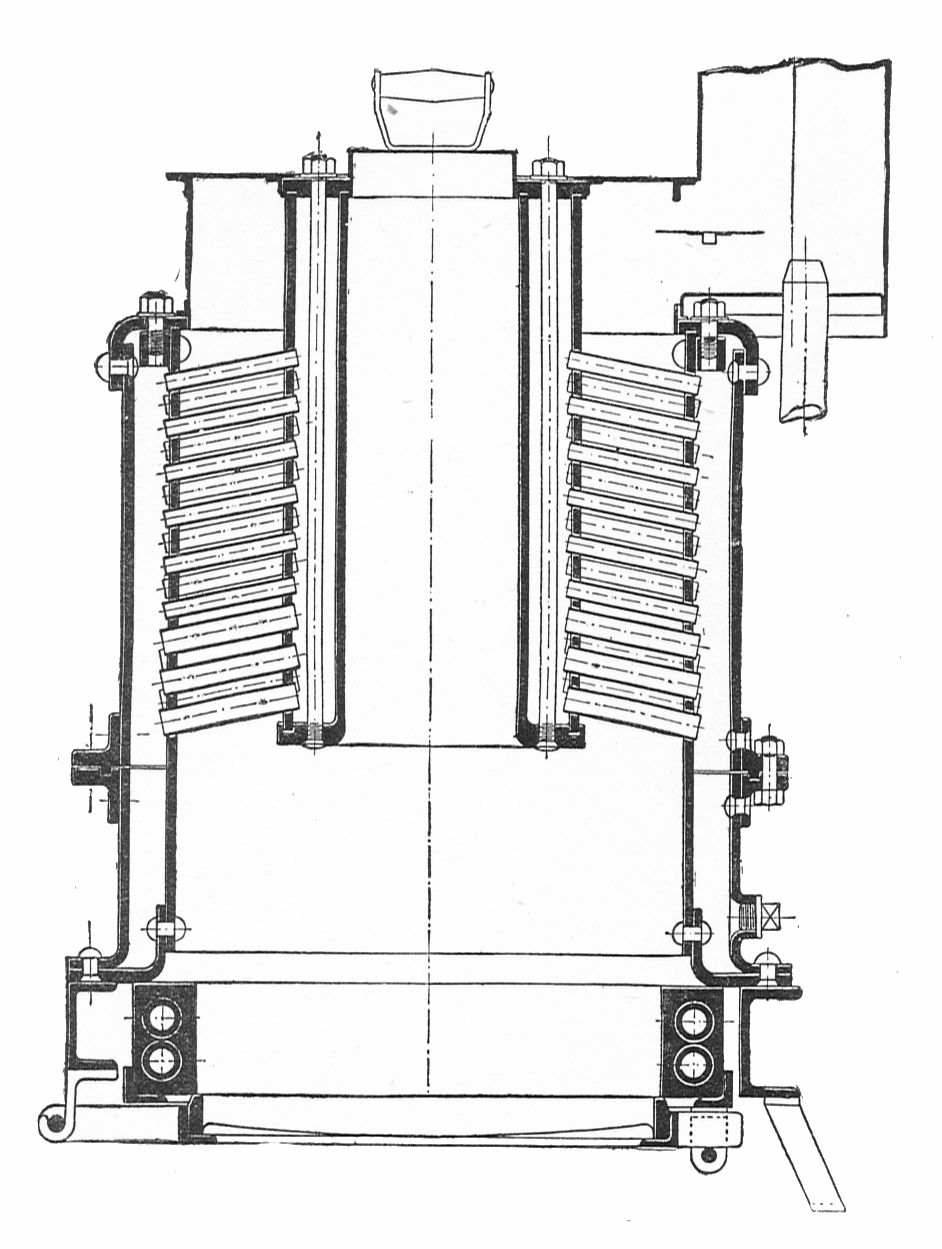
1902 boiler, section

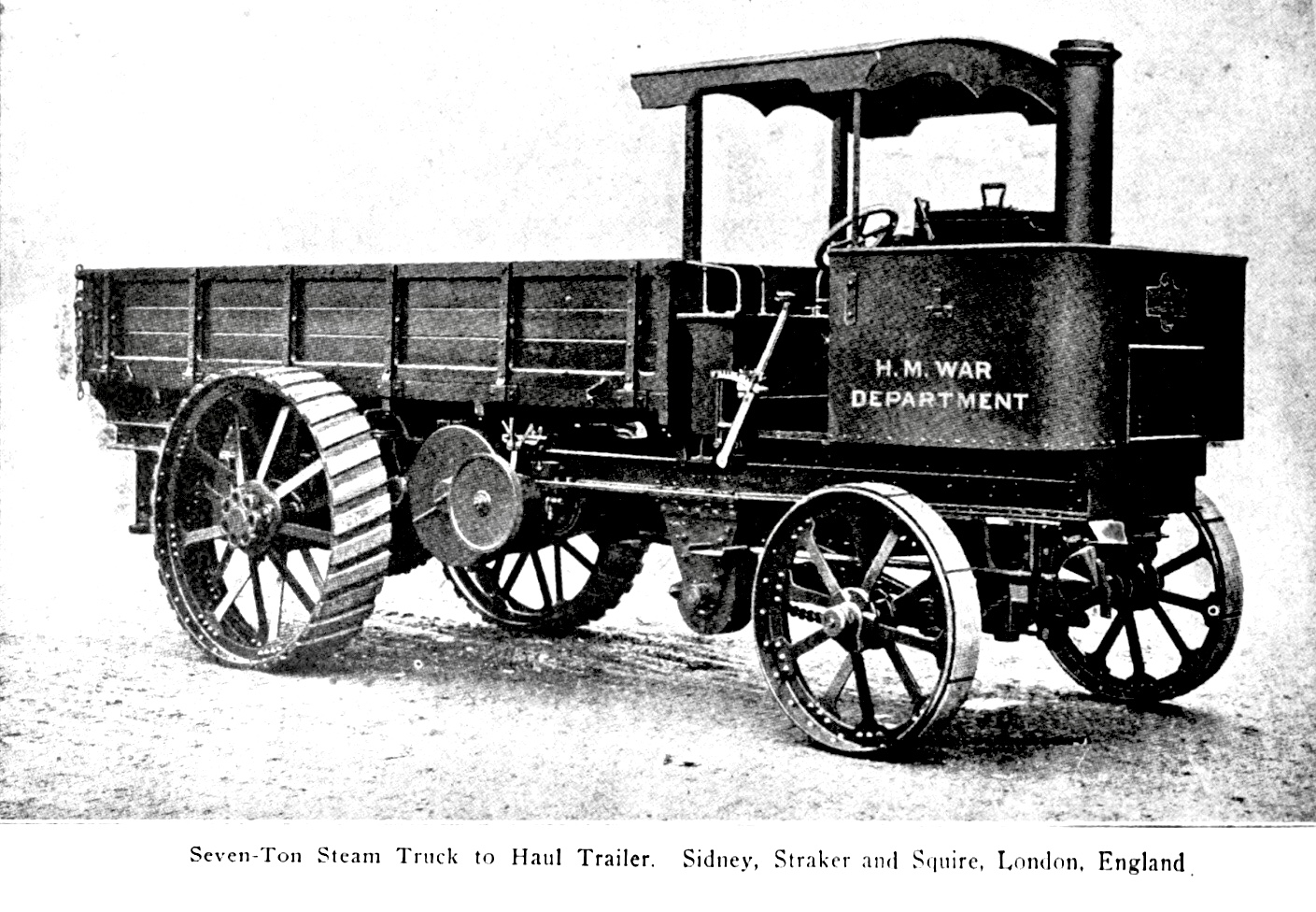
Straker-Squire 7 t (1908)

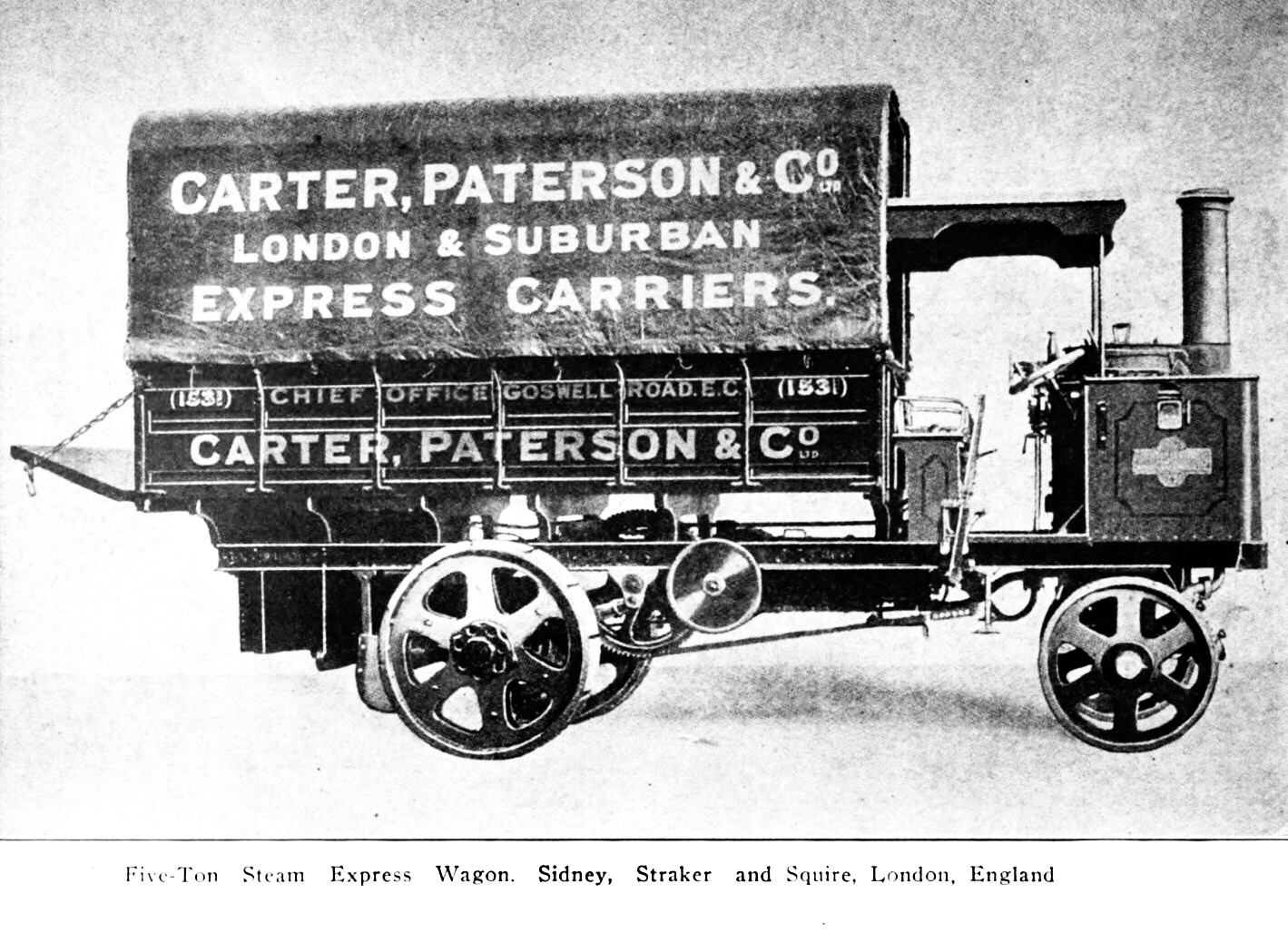
Straker-Squire 5 t (1908)

Straker began by building engines for steam wagons. A "Bayley" undertype wagon, fitted with a Straker engine and de Dion boiler took part in the Second Liverpool Steam Wagon Trials of 1899.

By 1901 Straker were building an entire wagon. This exchanged the previous gear drive to the rear axle with a chain drive. Although other steam wagons used chain drives, this was the first to use a single chain, with the differential mounted on the axle rather than the chassis, and with a chain to each wheel. The rear wheels were large in diameter and constructed on the traction engine pattern, with two rows of narrow built-up spokes. As these wheels were too large to fit under the load deck of the wagon, they were mounted outboard of it, requiring an extra-long axle. These wagons were sold by the 'Straker Steam Vehicle Co' with offices at 9 Bush Lane, London and the works in Bristol. They took part in the War Office Trials at Aldershot of 1901, where they were awarded £100, and 1902 By 1902 the rear wheels had been reduced in diameter and now had six broader spokes from a flat sheet: a single sheet for the 2 ton, doubled for the 5 and 7 ton models. The steam engine itself was a two-cylinder compound, with cylinders of 7" stroke and 4" and 7" diameter. The transmission was relatively crude, using open gears rather than the enclosed oil-bath that was in use amongst other makers, and indeed used for the high-speed engine of their 2-ton light tractor. Two gears were provided, but one was only intended for hill-climbing and could only be selected from alongside the engine, not from the driver's cab.

The boiler was Straker's own development of the original De Dion. It was a vertical water-tube boiler, constructed from four concentric tubes. The inner and outer pairs of tubes were joined to form two double-walled water jackets. Between these jackets ran numerous short, straight watertubes, sloping up slightly towards the centre. The central waterspace was higher than the outer space, acting as a steam dome. This also made the boiler's water level less sensitive to tilting when hill climbing, a great concern for many wagon makes. The boiler was fired by dropping fuel, usually gasworks coke, down a central firing chute. For cleaning every few months, the outer shell could be removed entirely.

In many ways the boiler was similar to, and a precursor of, the Sentinel of 1905. It did however require more labour to manufacture four shells rather than two, with considerably more tubes. The work of removing the boiler shell was also greater for the Straker, as it required the pipework and external fittings to first be removed.

For 1905, inspired by the new regulations, an almost completely new design was produced. This was a conventional traction engine-style overtype with a locomotive boiler.

No Straker steam wagons are known to have survived today.

== Car models ==
The first pre-war models consisted of the Straker-Squire 16/20 and 12/14 Shamrock. Next, Fedden designed the 15 hp model in three versions, which were more conventional than later designs influenced by the company's experience in aero engines. These 4-seater 15-20 hp models were developed over six years and in advertising were described as the best medium powered cars on the world market. A specially prepared 15-hp driven by Witchell took several records at Brooklands including the flying mile in 1910 at 95.54 mph (153.76 km/h) (21 hp class), and the same year saw class wins at the Aston Clinton, Caerphilly, Pateley Bridge and Saltburn Hill Climbs. 1914 saw similar success including 4th in the TT.

Production of the 15 hp was revived after World War I, which was joined by the large 6 cylinder 20/25, 24/80 and 24/90 models. The 24/90 was light, quick and noisy, it was guaranteed to meet 70 mph (110 km/h) and was priced at the 1919 Olympia Motor Show initially at £1,600. Straker's nephew H "Bertie" Kensington Moir of Aston Martin fame tested the prototype at Brooklands and set a class record lap at 103.76 mph. The final cars built by Straker-Squire were the lighter 4 cylinder 10/20 and 12/20 models.

The full list of Straker-Squire models is:

- CSB. 1906. 25 hp 4900 cc T-head engine. Imported French Cornilleau-Ste Beuve model. Competed in 1907 the Heavy-Car Tourist Trophy.
- 16/20. 1907, 4cyl 2919 cc engine.
- 12/14 Shamrock. 1907, 20 hp 4cyl 2069 cc water-cooled engine, 10 ft 5 in (3.18 m) in length.

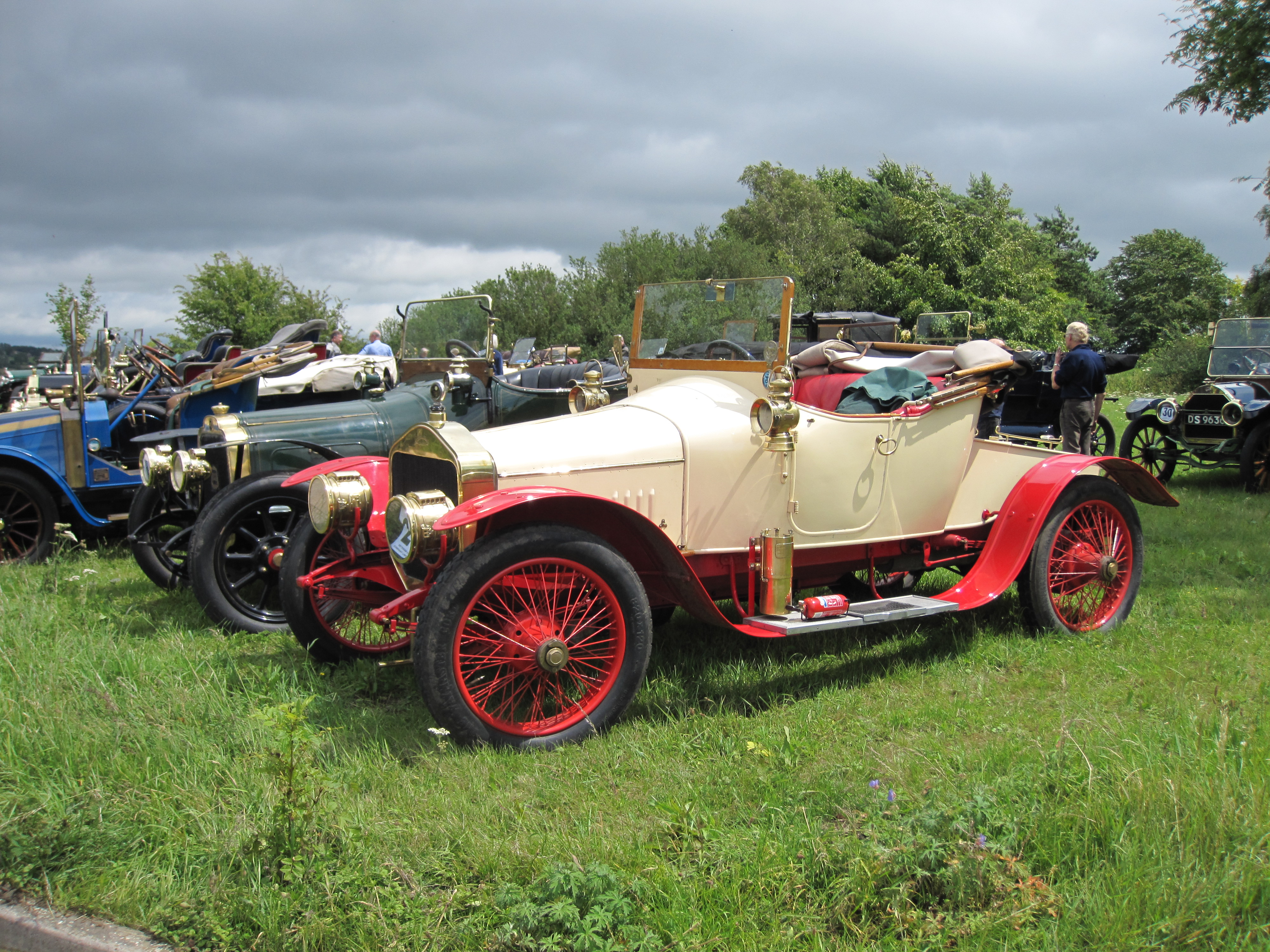
15 hp Mark 2 1912

- 14/16. 1909, 4cyl 2022 cc 15hp engine, 12 ft 6 in (3.81 m) in length. Completed in the RAC 2,000 Miles Trial and was placed 3rd in class.
- 15 hp Mark 1. 1910 model, 4cyl 2851 cc side-valve engine, 12 ft 6 in (3.81 m) in length.
- 15 hp Mark 2. 1911-13 model. As above but heavier and 13 ft 1.5 in (4.001 m) in length.
- 15 hp Mark 3. 1914-22 model. Improved 4cyl 3054 cc side-valve engine and 13 ft 7 in (4.14 m) in length.
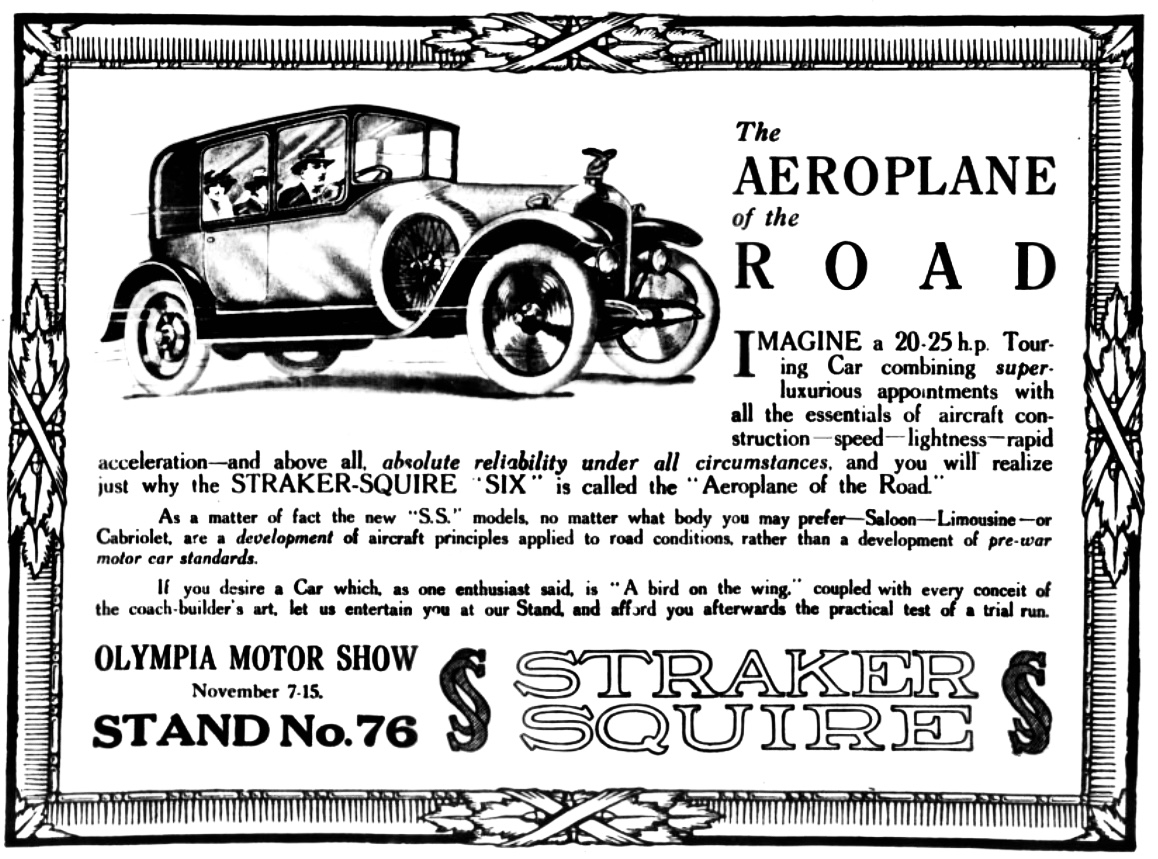
- Straker-Squire 20/25 (1919–1925)
  20/25. 1919–25, 6cyl 3920 cc engine with overhead cam, 70 bhp (52 kW; 71 PS) at 2400 rpm, 14 ft 2 in (4.32 m) in length. 75 mph (121 km/h) in normal spec.
- 24/80. 1920–25. As 20/25 but with longer wheelbase.
- 24/90. 1921. 6cyl 4962 cc overhead valve engine. 67 built.
- 10/20. 1923–25. 4cyl 1460 cc overhead valve engine, a lighter car of various bodywork length between 12 ft 6 in (3.81 m) and 13 ft 4 in (4.06 m) 92+ built.
- 11/28. 1926. 4cyl 1460 cc overhead valve engine, 30 bhp (22 kW), 12 ft 6 in (3.81 m) in length.
- 12/20. 1926. As above but with wider track.

== Bus manufacturing ==
Straker-Squire began by supplying a small number of buses to GWR road motor services before expanding rapidly to cater for the London Bus market. In 1905 work included the bus chassis used for Royal Army Medical Corps ambulances and they manufactured 50 omnibus chassis and engines for London buses. By 1909 Straker-Squire dominated the market and the factory in Fishponds supplied 70% of London's buses. Great Eastern of London took delivery of another 22 in bright yellow chrome livery in 1911. Post war the A-type bus in chassis and/or body form sold very well.

The company was also involved in the manufacture of trolleybuses. The general manager of the Teesside Railless Traction Board developed a new and improved trolleybus design and Clough, Smith arranged for it to be manufactured. It was marketed as the Straker-Clough trolley omnibus. This chassis and design came to be regarded as both pioneering and improving the industry standard. The chassis was manufactured by Straker-Squire, the electrical equipment by BTH of Rugby, Warwickshire, and Clough, Smith arranged production of the bodies. The whole would be sold to system operators as part of a package deal which included the design, supply and installation of the overhead electrical equipment.

== Truck models ==
The first trucks built were German designed Büssing 2cyl trucks under licence from 1906. Truck models included.:

- Büssing 3-ton. 1906–09. 4cyl worm drive petrol engine. German design built under licence.
- Colonial 5-ton. 1910.
- Military 3/4-ton. 1913–18. Built in large numbers for the British Army.
- A type 5-ton. 1919. Semi-forward-control, 4cyl worm drive engine.

Commercial vehicle production moved to Twickenham during the war. After car production ended in 1926 a limited number of bus and truck chassis and Straker-Clough trolley buses were also built.

== See also ==
- List of car manufacturers of the United Kingdom
