= Mayfield Park, Bristol =

Coordinates: 51.4805°N 2.5241°W

Mayfield Park
- Location within Bristol
- OS grid reference: ST637758
- Unitary authority: Bristol
- Ceremonial county: Bristol
- Region: South West
- Country: England
- Sovereign state: United Kingdom
- Post town: BRISTOL
- Postcode district: BS
- Dialling code: 0117
- Police: Avon and Somerset
- Fire: Avon
- Ambulance: South Western
- UK Parliament: Bristol North East

Mayfield Park is a residential area in East Bristol, with a large adjoining park known as the Ridgeway Rd Playing Fields.

The area is located on the outskirts of the outer urban area of Fishponds and consists mainly of four roads: Mayfield Park, Mayfield Park North, Mayfield Park South and Mayfield Avenue. It is also near the main road of Berkeley Road and the outer urban area with the name of Speedwell, and adjacent to Chester Park. The area has a population of 1,730 (est).

== History of the area ==
Originally part of the Royal Forest of Kingswood, the area around Mayfield Park started to be cleared for agriculture from the 13th century. By 1839, the area was part of the Parish of Stapleton and was known as the 'Crooked Lane Inclosures' where the park is today and the 'Reeves Ground' where the houses were later built. In the 1880s, the Provincial Land Company let land in allotments for building purposes, and a large number of semi-detached villas and other houses were built and the area became known as Mayfield Park.

Until the Hillfields Housing estate was built in the 1920s, Mayfield Park encompassed an area which extended across Lodge Causeway to the north-east. In 1934 a Roman coin dating from the time of Vespasian, Roman Emperor between 69-79 AD, was found in a neighbours garden in Mayfield Park South, but no other Roman evidence has been found.

== The playing fields and nature park ==
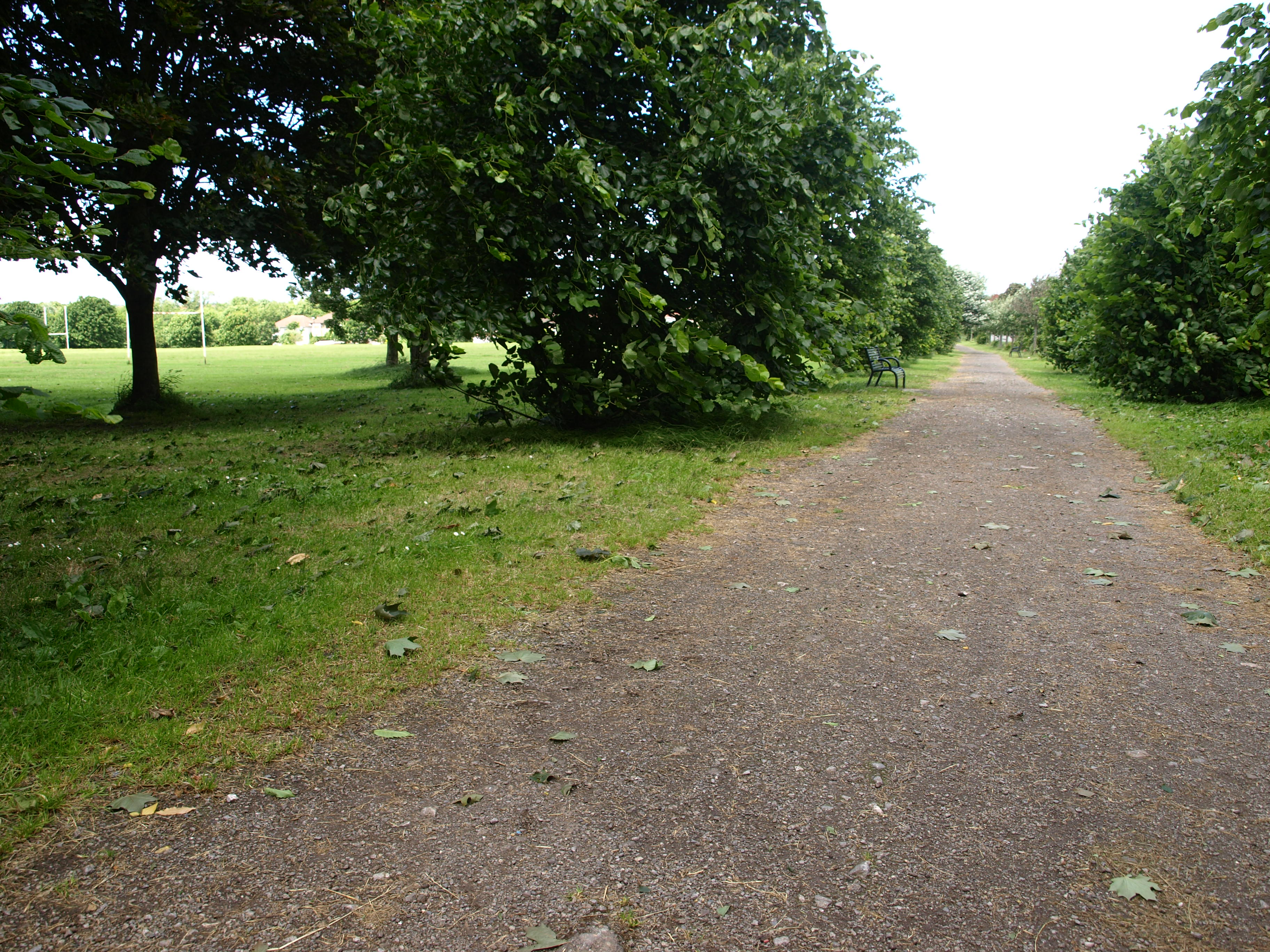
The central path across the park, with the pitches of Whitehall RFC in the background

Ridgeway Rd Playing Fields is a large park, extending about 850 yards in length and 250 yards across, with access to the Bristol to Bath Cycle Path at the western end. At the centre of the park are the pitches of Whitehall Rugby Football Club, founded in 1931, with a clubhouse on Foundry Lane. At the eastern end of the park in the Harry Crook Youth Activities Centre with basketball hoops and a small children's playground.

Coombe Brook Valley Nature Park extends for about 450 yards to the south east towards Chester Park, known locally as the 'Gossey' as it lies within the medieval Gosthills Gully. Managed by Avon Wildlife Trust, the 1.6 hectare valley is a haven for wildlife including hazel, oak and sycamore trees, and mature scrub of hawthorn and elder. It provides habitat for birds such as the wren, greenfinch and spotted flycatcher, and butterflies including small tortoiseshell, peacock and speckled wood.

== Churches and facilities ==
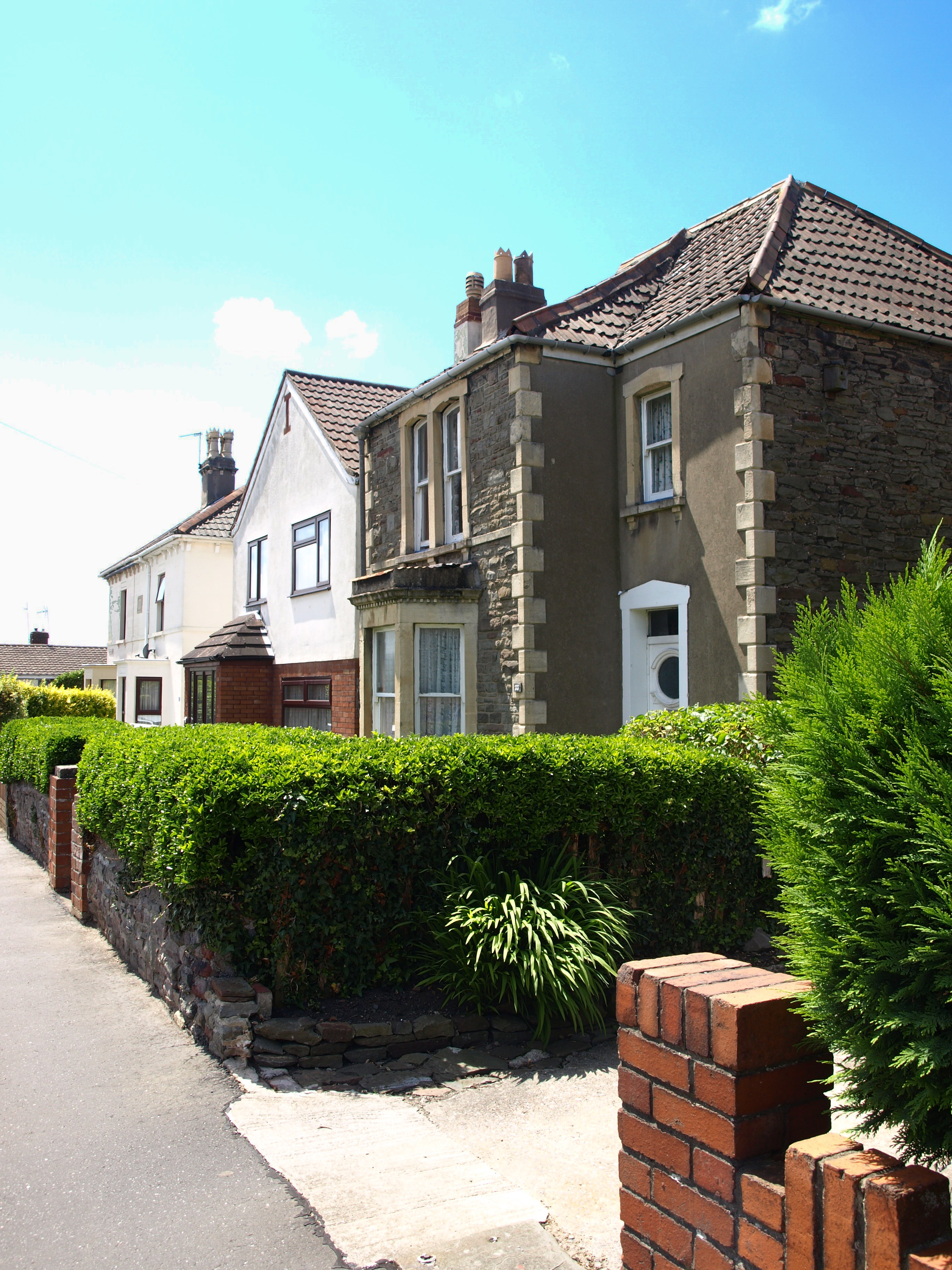
Mayfield Park contains a number of older buildings, some of these houses date from 1878

A number of churches serve the area including St John's Church of England Church, built in 1911, and St Joseph's Roman Catholic Church, built in 1925, both on Lodge Causeway. Near the park is the more modern Abingdon Road Gospel Hall, an Evangelical Church of the Noncomformist Christian Brethren built in 1937, with a large church hall backing onto the playing fields. The Morley Congregational Church originally built between Ivy Lane and Mayfield Avenue in 1889 was demolished in 1970 after it encountered structural problems, and now sites a block of modern flats.

There are three schools near the Mayfield park area: the primary schools of Chester Park School, St Josephs School and Bristol Brunel Academy.

== Public houses and shops ==
The closest pubs are The Spotted Cow and The Greyhound, built in 1883, on Lodge Causeway, whose shops also serve the area along with those on Ridgeway Road.
