= Cosmos Engineering =

Cosmos Engineering Company
- Industry: Aerospace, automotive
- Founded: 1918
- Defunct: 1920
- Fate: Liquidated, taken over
- Successor: Bristol Aeroplane Company
- Headquarters: Fishponds, England, UK
- Key people: Roy Fedden

Cosmos Engineering was a company that manufactured aero-engines in a factory in Fishponds, Bristol during World War I. Sir Roy Fedden, the company's principal designer, developed the 14-cylinder radial Mercury engine during this period. The company was taken over by the Bristol Aeroplane Company in 1920.

== Company origins ==
In 1918 the Anglo-American company Cosmos bought Straker-Squire (also known as Brazil Straker), a car and bus manufacturing firm which had branched out into aircraft engine repair and manufacture. This began by first reconditioning, then substantially redesigning and re-manufacturing Curtiss OX-5 engines. Due to the quality of this work, they were the only company permitted to manufacture Rolls-Royce aircraft engines under licence, building Hawk and Falcon engines, major components for the Eagle engine and also 600 Renault 80hp 8Ca engines. Over 1,500 engines were produced in total. The company was one of the first to be brought under Admiralty control, and Fedden and his draughtsman Leonard Butler designed two engines during the war; the 14-cylinder Mercury and the larger, 9-cylinder Jupiter.

== Aero-engine range ==
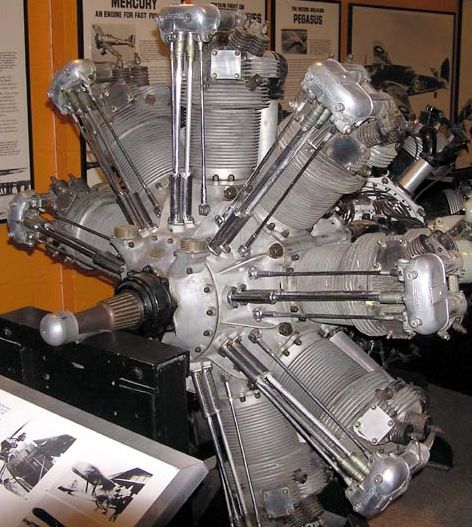
The Bristol Jupiter engine designed by Roy Fedden whilst at Cosmos

In 1919 the range consisted of the 450 hp Jupiter, the 300 hp Mercury and the smaller 100 hp Lucifer. On 9 April 1919 a Bristol Scout F fitted with a Mercury engine set two British records at Farnborough achieving the time to 10,000 ft and 20,000 ft records.

== Car production ==
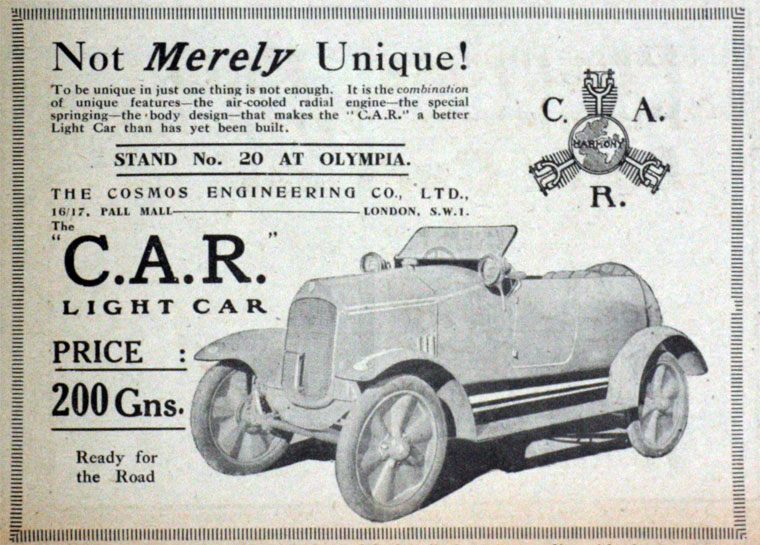
Cosmos 10.5 ad, November 1919

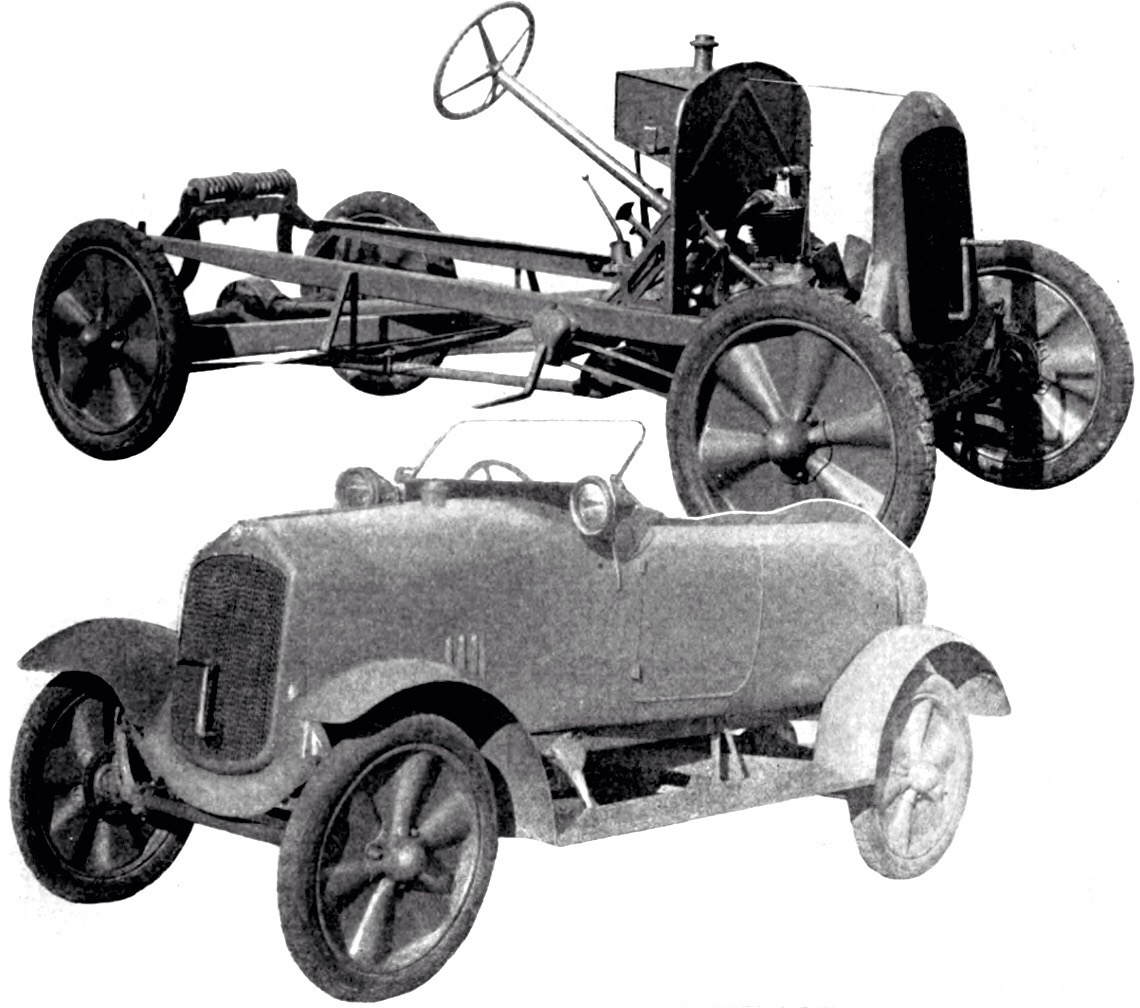
Cosmos 10.5 (1919-1920)

Despite selling off the engineering side of Brazil Straker, which continued to successfully build cars, Cosmos Engineering also produced a small number of Fedden-designed cars. The Cosmos 10.5 of 1919, featured an air-cooled 3-cylinder radial layout 994-cc engine of 16 hp and pressed-steel wobbly-web wheels, and was significantly innovative for its time. Only a limited number were made, and it was followed up by the larger 10.5 CAR which never got beyond prototype stage.

== Fate ==
Soon afterwards the company went into liquidation and was taken over by the Bristol Aeroplane Company in 1920. Operations then moved to a former flying school located on the northern edge of Filton Aerodrome. The factory on Lodge Causeway was subsequently taken over by Parnall & Sons for shop and ship fitting and aircraft component manufacturing.

== See also ==
Related lists

- List of aircraft engine manufacturers
