= George Adlam & Sons =

George Adlam & Sons Ltd
- Type: Private
- Industry: Engineering
- Founded: Bristol, UK (1800)
- Founder: George Adlam
- Defunct: 1965
- Headquarters: Bristol, UK
- Key people: George Adlam; Edwin G. Adlam
- Products: Iron, Brass, brewery plant

George Adlam & Sons Ltd (formerly known as George Adlam) was an iron and brass foundry and engineering company in Fishponds, Bristol, England.

== History ==
The company was founded around 1800 and became a limited company in 1908.

The company was based on Parnall Road in the 1830s and soon expanded into a worldwide business building machinery for the chocolate and brewing industries, taking over the former foundry of Parnall & Sons. Work included the construction of the Phillips & Sons Dock Road Brewery in Newport in 1887, the rebuild of Portsmouth United Breweries in 1896, the Wadworth Northgate Brewery stationary steam engine in 1900 (which still exists) and design of the Madras BBB brewery in India in 1913.

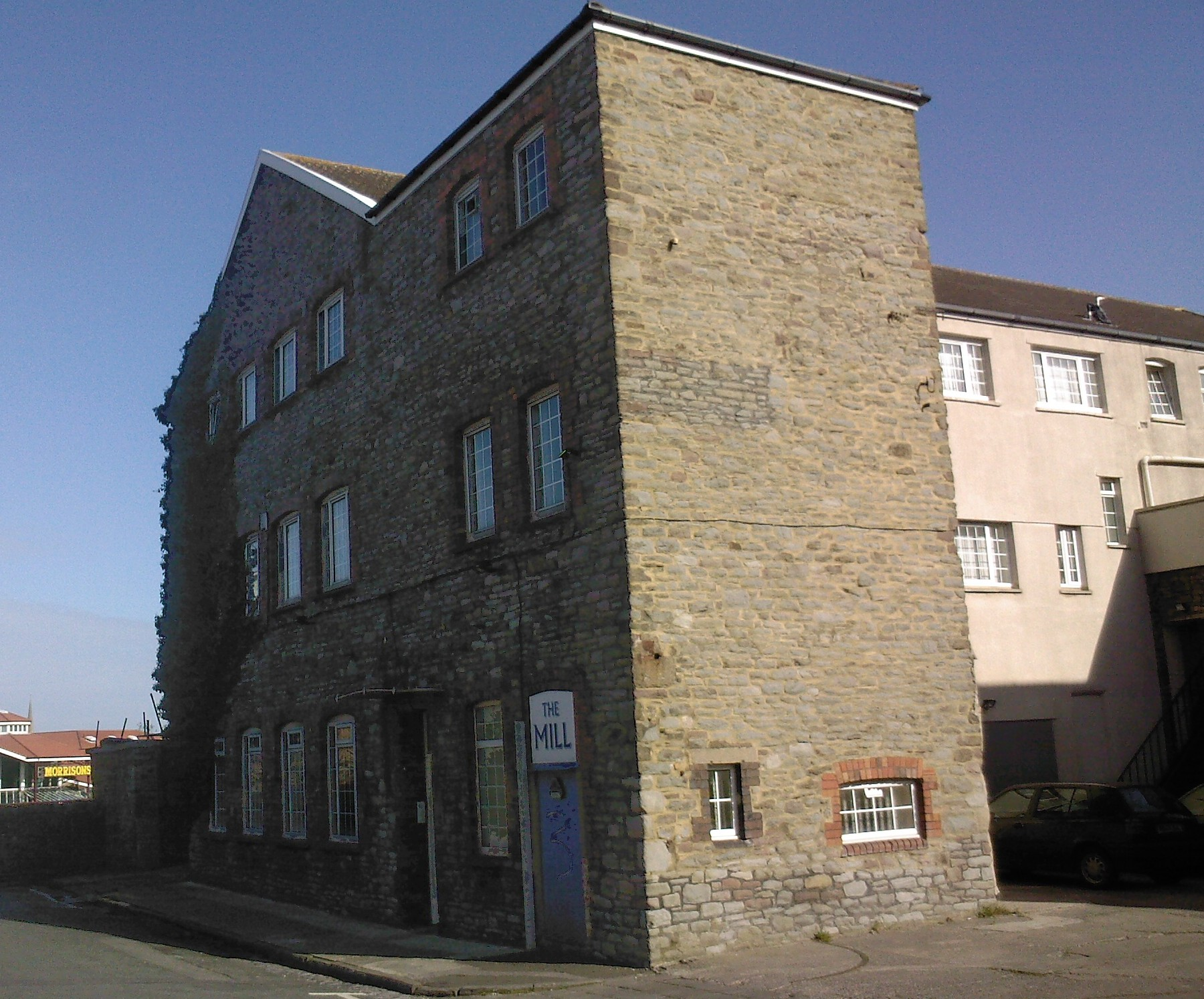
The Adlams Works or the Mill as seen today

=== Post war ===
In 1945 they described themselves as brewers and general engineers, coppersmiths, vat and back makers, sheet metal workers, brass and ironfounders, showing the diversity of their work. The height came in 1961 when they had booming orders and employed 400 staff round the clock to meet demand. It was not to last as a combination of a High Court noise case and a lack of raw materials curtailed firstly the production of brewing tanks, then led to the company collapsing in November 1963. The brewery tank business moved to Cheltenham and the site was sold in 1965.

The foundry frontage, constructed of stone with brick window surrounds, is now known as The Mill or the Adlams Works on Parnall Road is now used as residential and Art, Media and Design company offices including the Rohan Music Studios and Intellect Publishers.

The company later acquired Parnall & Sons.

== Products and services ==
The company designed and fabricated brewery plant, with its first recorded design for a brewery dated 1885.

=== Brewery ships ===
In 1944 the company designed a brewing ship for the Royal Navy to serve soldiers with beer in the Pacific Theatre in World War II capable of making 250 barrels of beer a week. Initially four were ordered, but this reduced to two and the former Blue Funnel Line 7,500 ton auxiliary minesweepers Agamemnon and Menestheus, were outfitted in Vancouver, British Columbia, Canada, in the summer of 1945.

Only Menestheus saw service, completed on 31 December 1945 and completing a six-month deployment to Pacific ports including Yokohama, Shanghai and Hong Kong to dispense English Mild ale to sailors. Her brew house, known as "Davy Jones Brewery" was dismantled in 1946 and the ship was returned to her owners in 1948.
