= Fedden Cotswold =

Aircraft engine

The Cotswold was a turboprop aircraft engine designed by Roy Fedden after the Second World War.

Intended to power airliners for short or medium ranges, cruising at 300–350 mph (480–560 km/h; 260–300 kn) and 30,000 ft (9,100 m), the Cotswold produced 1,350 hp (1,010 kW; 1,370 PS), and was meant to be installed within the wings of aircraft in either tractor or pusher configuration. With eleven axial compressor stages and two turbine stages, it was only 27 in (69 cm) in diameter and weighed 760 lb (345 kg).

The company making it, Roy Fedden Ltd., went into liquidation in April 1947, and no engines were manufactured.
