= Hillfields, Bristol =

Area of Bristol, England

Coordinates: 51.4747°N 2.5188°W

Hillfields
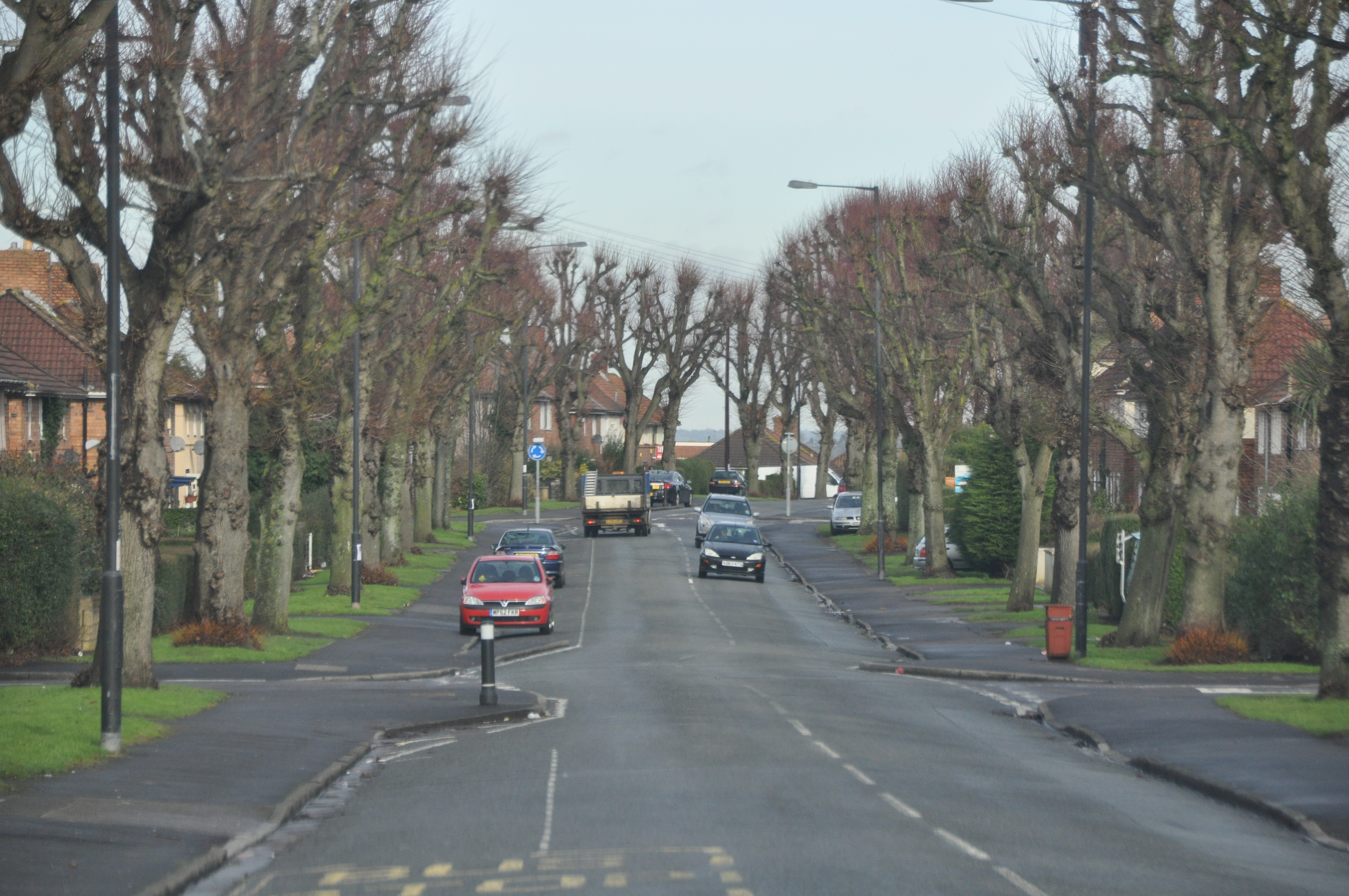
- Thicket Avenue in Hillfields

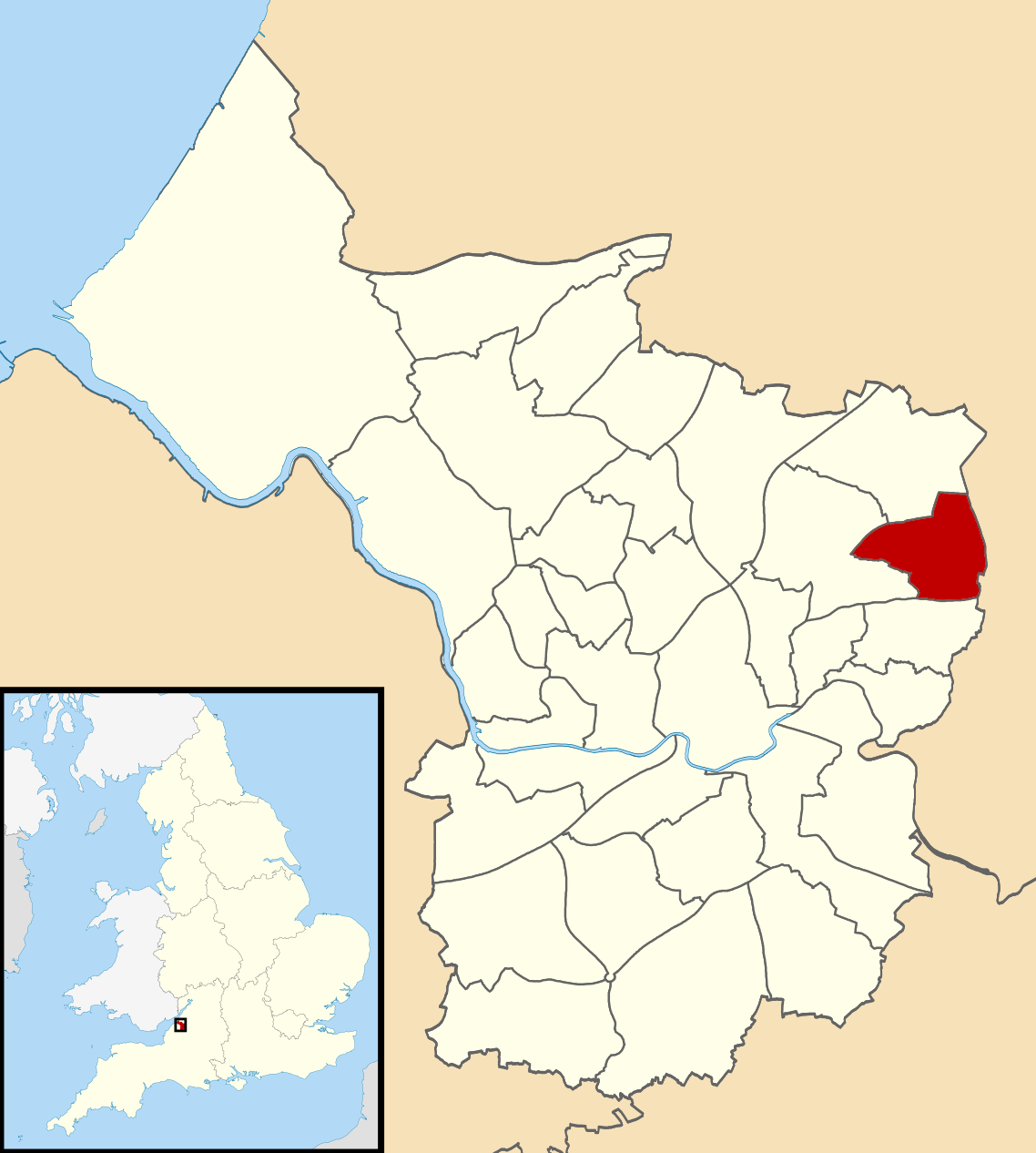
- Boundaries of the city council ward since 2016
- Population: 13,504 (2011.Ward)
- OS grid reference: ST645761
- Unitary authority: Bristol
- Ceremonial county: Bristol
- Region: South West
- Country: England
- Sovereign state: United Kingdom
- Post town: BRISTOL
- Postcode district: BS16
- Dialling code: 0117
- Police: Avon and Somerset
- Fire: Avon
- Ambulance: South Western
- UK Parliament: Bristol North East

Hillfields is an area and ward of north-east Bristol.

The Ward of Hillfields covers the following areas of Bristol:

- Chester Park
- Hillfields East
- Hillfields North
- Hillfields West
- Lodge Hill
- Mayfield Park
- Speedwell
- Staple Hill Road South

Hillfields itself is a relatively modern area of Bristol on the outskirts of Fishponds developed since the First World War on the north side of Lodge Causeway.

== History ==
Among the architects involved in the first phase of Hillfields were Eveline Dew Blacker and Harry Heathman. Their firm was among the winners of Bristol Corporation's 1919 housing competition, and at Hillfields they were responsible for a two-bedroom test design and a three-bedroom non-parlour short-terrace type, later versions of which appeared on many interwar estates across Bristol.

Building commenced on Hillfields Park Housing estate in 1919, and the estate was first to be built under the National Housing Scheme in Bristol. Hillfields was further expanded in 1922 when the new Elisha Smith Robinson paper and printing company opened in Filwood Road, Fishponds, and the company arranged for houses to be built at Maple Avenue to accommodate the new workers.

The area expanded quickly, Hillfields Park Infant School opened in 1927 and the junior school opened in 1929. The most famous pupil to go to the junior school was Arthur Milton, who played County cricket for Gloucestershire County from 1948 to 1974, and gained 6 caps with the England cricket team. He also played football for Arsenal from 1951 to 1955, then Bristol City and gained 1 cap for the England National Football Team against Austria at Wembley.

More recently, the Briarwood School for students with severe learning difficulties from primary to sixth form has been built on Briar Way.

== Churches and facilities ==
The church in the centre of Hillfields is Hillfields Park Baptist Church, opened on 8 May 1929 and built by Foster & Son, and originally supported by the Fishponds Baptist Church. It also contains a Baptist church Youth Club. The area is also served by Hillfields Library, run by Bristol City Council, and the Community centre and recreational grounds in Hillfields Park.

Cossham Memorial Hospital, founded in 1907, is in the ward near Kingswood, South Gloucestershire.
