= William Yalland =

English cricketer

William Yalland (27 June 1889 – 23 October 1914) was an English cricketer. He was a right-handed batsman who played for Gloucestershire. He was born in Fishponds and killed in action when he was shot through the head while defending a trench at the First Battle of Ypres during World War I.

Yalland made a single first-class appearance for the team, during the 1910 County Championship, against Somerset. Batting in the lower order, Yalland scored a single run in the only innings in which he batted.
