= Lodge Hill, Bristol =

Area of Bristol, England

Coordinates: 51.4693°N 2.5145°W

- Location within Bristol
- OS grid reference: ST637758
- Unitary authority: Bristol
- Ceremonial county: Bristol
- Region: South West
- Country: England
- Sovereign state: United Kingdom
- Post town: BRISTOL
- Postcode district: BS
- Dialling code: 0117
- Police: Avon and Somerset
- Fire: Avon
- Ambulance: South Western
- UK Parliament: Bristol North East

Lodge Hill is a hill and residential area of Bristol, England. It is in the electoral ward of Hillfields, Bristol, separating the large outer urban areas of Fishponds and Kingswood. Cossham Memorial Hospital is at its peak which is the highest point in urban Bristol at 369 ft (112 m). It has a population of 1,722 (est).

== Early history ==
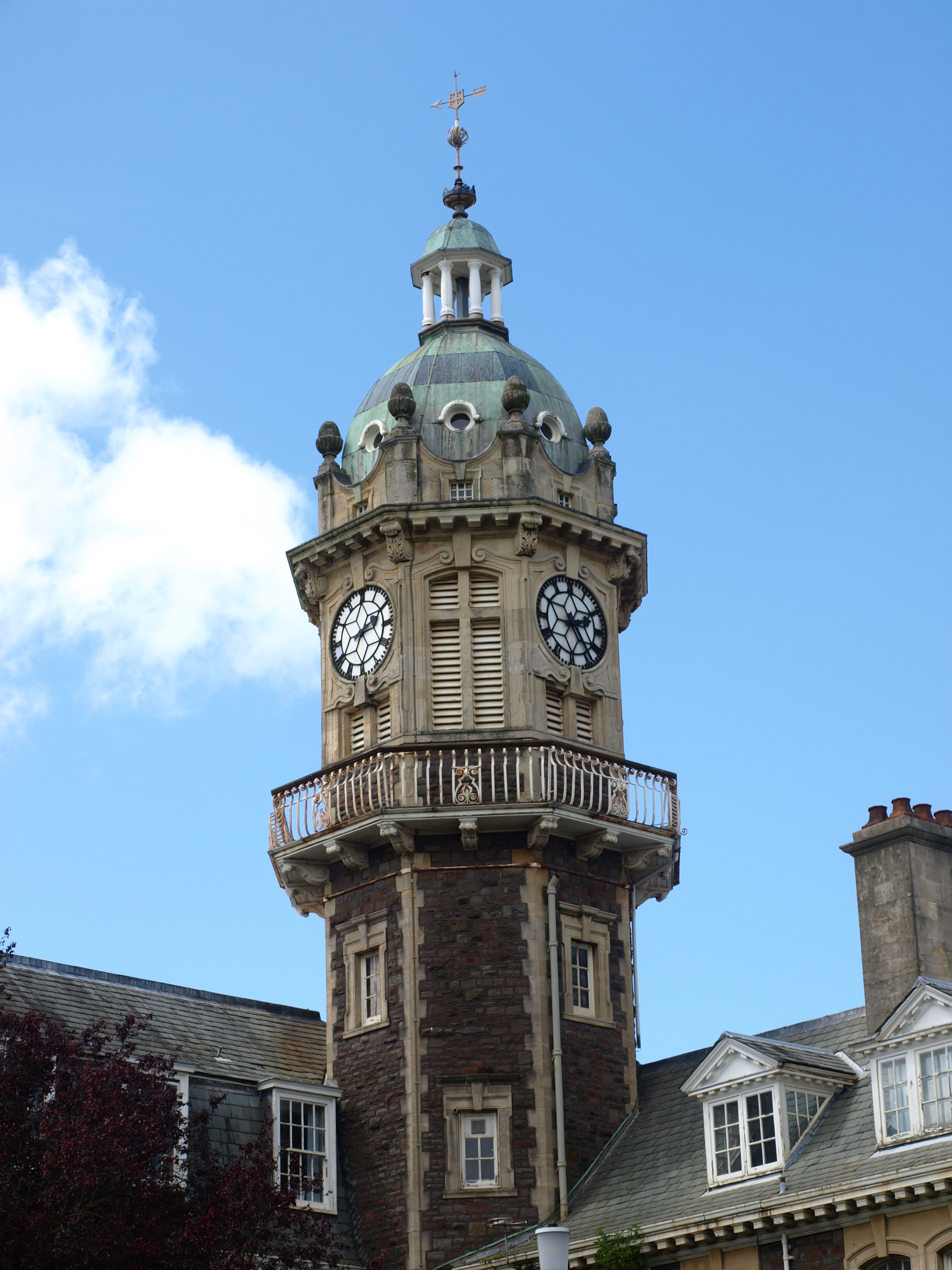
The clock tower of Cossham Memorial Hospital on top of Lodge Hill

Lodge Hill once had commanding views of the Royal Forest of Kingswood, known to have been used by kings for hunting since Saxon times. Reached by Lodge Causeway at the top of the hill once stood King John’s Lodge or Kingswood Lodge, named after its most famous resident. A lodge is thought to have existed since the 13th century, certainly a two-storey building existed before 1610. During the mid-to-late 19th century an old iron smelting tower was incorporated into the building and it was known as Kingswood Castle, by now a substantial building with castellated roof lines. At one time it was used as a windmill and in 1928 the cellar still contained the vault of the original tower which had very thick walls and an underground passage which led to Hill House, overlooking Staple Hill. It was pulled down soon afterwards.

The area around Lodge Hill was studded by coalpits, where the deepest was reported as 600 ft (183 m) deep in 1793. A large coalpit known as the Kingswood Lodge Coalpit once existing on the hill between Cossham Memorial Hospital and Charlton Road. On 11 Apr 1833, five boys were rescued there after being trapped for six nights. The pit, belonging to Messrs. Brain & Co had an even more serious incident six years later when 11 workers died after water flooded the pit.

== Shoe manufacturing ==
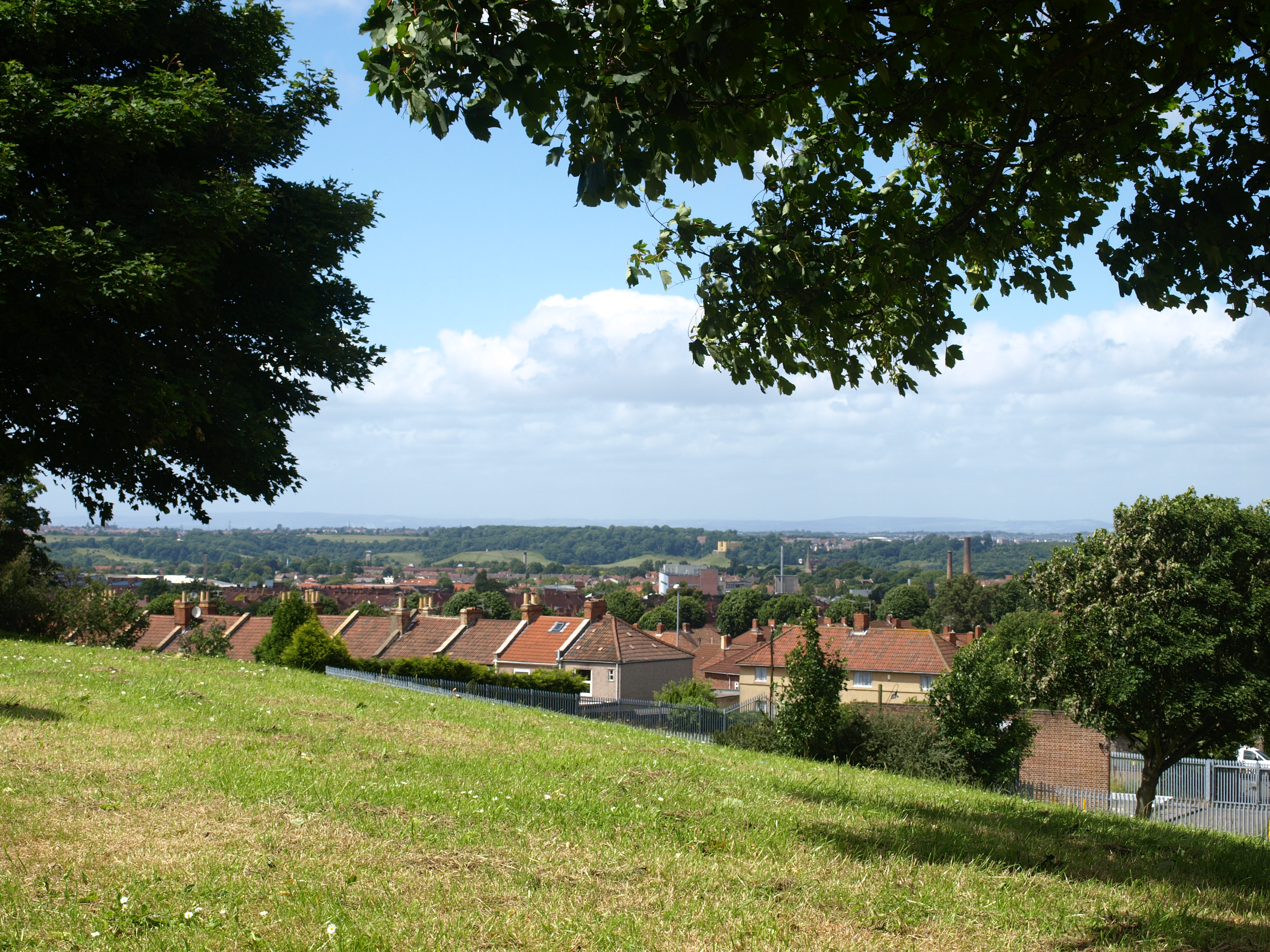
The view of East Bristol from Lodge Hill, including the chimneys of Fishponds and the Downs

In 1900 G.B. Britton & Sons, left their original premises in Waters Road, Kingswood, and set up a larger factory on Lodge Road. In 1914 the factory was further expanded to provide army boots in the First World War and at its peak just before the Second World War employed 11,000 people. In 1941, the factory on Lodge road was requisitioned by the Ministry of Aircraft Production to build aircraft components. Boot and shoe manufacturing resumed in 1945 and included the TUF boot exported and manufactured widely overseas leading to a second factory on Lodge Road built in 1959. Manufacturing ended and the factory finally shut in 2001, under the ownership of the UK Safe group who have relocated the sales and operations elsewhere in Bristol.

== Recreation ==
GB Britton’s Lawn bowling Club still exists on Ingleside Road, and the small park abreast Lodge Hill has great views of East Bristol.
