= Cossham Hospital =

Hospital in Bristol, England

Cossham Memorial Hospital
- Bristol NHS Foundation Trust
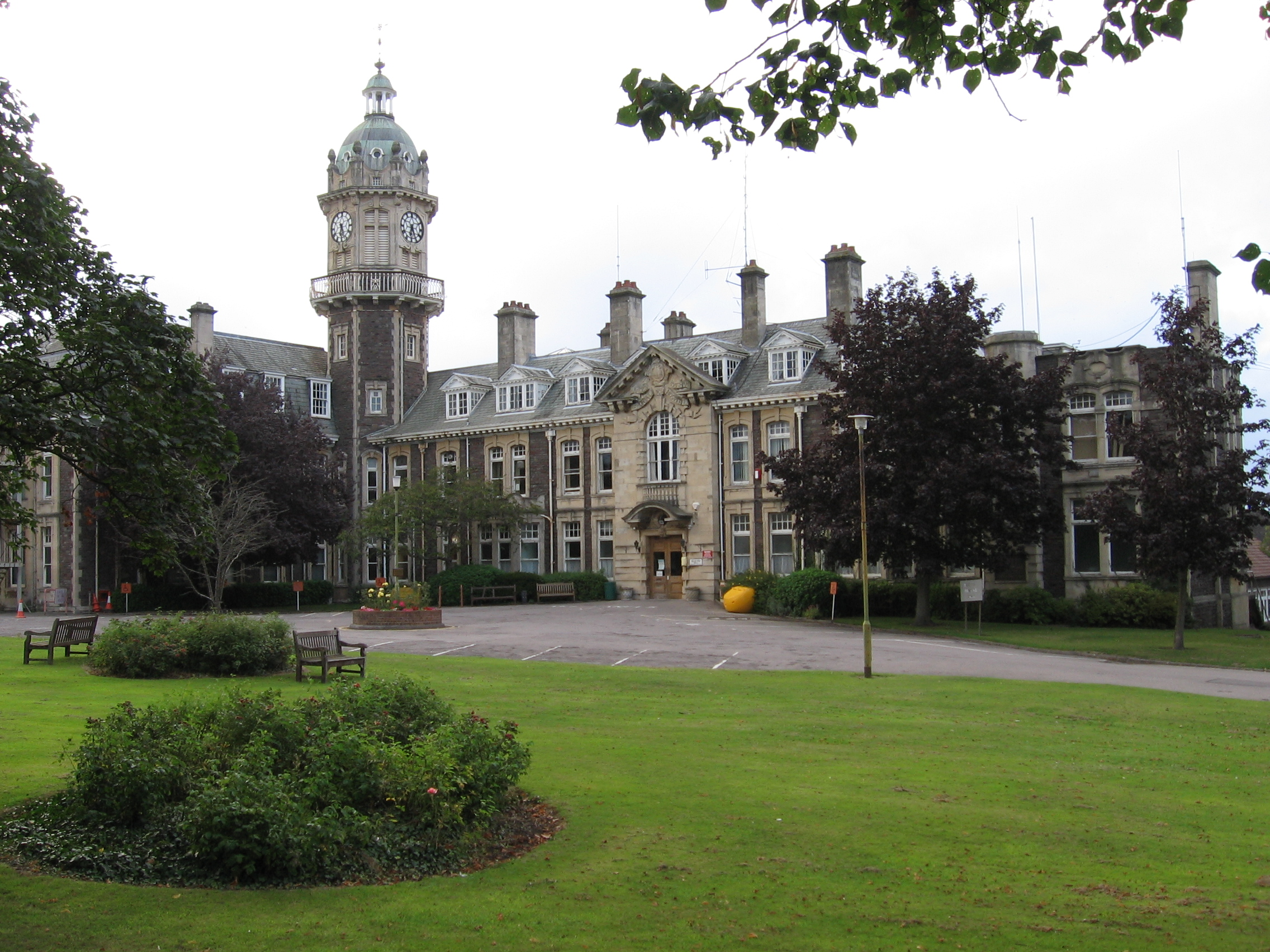
- Cossham Memorial Hospital

- Shown in Bristol

Geography
- Location: Bristol, England, United Kingdom
- Coordinates: 51.4688°N 2.5162°W

Organisation
- Care system: Public NHS
- Type: Community
- Affiliated university: University of the West of England

Services
- Emergency department: No Accident & Emergency

History
- Founded: 1907

Links
- Lists: Hospitals in England

Cossham Memorial Hospital is a community hospital, founded in 1907, in Hillfields, Bristol, England.

== History ==
The hospital was built by Frederick Bligh Bond in a Queen Anne style between 1905 and 1907, as a memorial to Handel Cossham, a former MP and Mayor of Bath who died in 1890. Sited on Lodge Hill, its clock tower is the highest point in Bristol and can be seen for miles around. It has been designated by English Heritage as a Grade II listed building. Major renovation work was carried out at the hospital, finishing in 2012.

== Services ==
The services provided by North Bristol NHS Trust at Cossham include outpatient clinics for various specialties and physiotherapy services.

== Archives ==
Records of the Cossham Memorial Hospital are held at Bristol Archives (Ref. 41171).

== See also ==
- Grade II listed buildings in Bristol
- List of hospitals in England
