= Roy Fedden =

British aircraft engine designer (1885–1973)

- Born: Alfred Hubert Roy Fedden; 6 June 1885; Bristol, England
- Died: 21 November 1973 (aged 88); Brecknock, Wales
- Education: Clifton College
- Engineering career
- Institutions: Brazil Straker; Cosmos Engineering; Bristol Aeroplane Company
- Projects: Bristol Jupiter
- Significant advance: Aircraft engines
- Awards: Member of the Order of the British Empire (1920); Daniel Guggenheim Medal (1938); Knighted (1942)

Sir Alfred Hubert Roy Fedden MBE, FRAeS (6 June 1885 – 21 November 1973) was an engineer who designed most of Bristol Engine Company's successful piston aircraft engine designs.

== Early life ==
Fedden was born in the Bristol area to fairly wealthy and influential parents. His older brother was the artist Romilly Fedden. Fedden's family was the first in the area to own a car, an interesting parallel with fellow engine designer, Harry Ricardo. This early influence almost certainly led to his future career. Fedden attended Clifton College, but did not do well scholastically and was known primarily for sports. After leaving, he declined to enter the Army, and announced he would apprentice as an engineer.

== Apprenticeship ==
His apprenticeship was completed in 1906, and he immediately designed a complete car. He managed to convince the local firm of Brazil Straker to hire him, and the design was produced as the successful Shamrock. He remained at Brazil Straker over the following years, and he was particularly influential in convincing company management to take on the repair of various aircraft engines when World War I started. The company's role soon expanded to producing Rolls-Royce Hawk and Falcon engines, as well as major parts of the famous Rolls-Royce Eagle. Henry Royce offered Fedden a senior position with his company, but Fedden declined.

In 1915, Fedden started the design of his own aero engine, along with his draughtsman Leonard Butler. The two were inseparable for the next twenty years, and the part number of most components of Fedden's engines were prefixed "FB" to indicate the shared credit. They designed two engines during World War I: the 14-cylinder radial Mercury, notable for the cylinders being arranged helically instead of in two rows, and the larger, more conventional single row nine-cylinder Jupiter design of about 400 horsepower (300 kW).

== Cosmos Engineering and the Jupiter ==
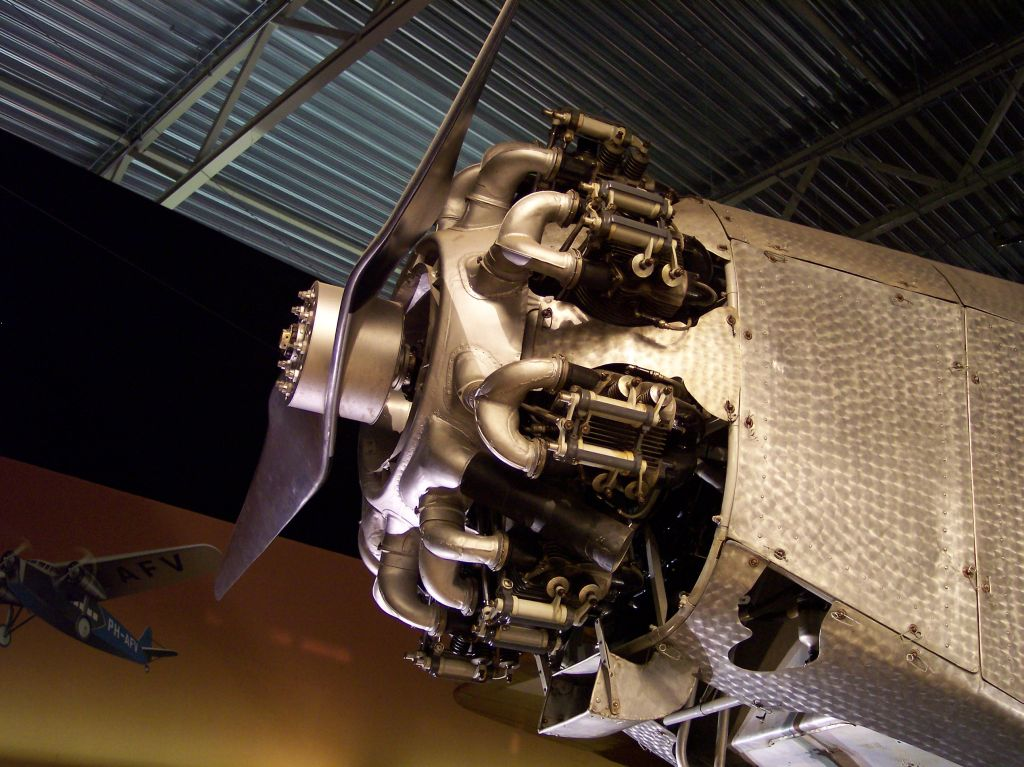
The Bristol Jupiter, designed by Roy Fedden

During this period, the aviation portions of Brazil Straker were purchased by Cosmos Engineering, where work on the designs continued. Both were ready for testing in 1918, but there seemed to be little interest at first. In September, however, a Mercury was experimentally fitted to a Bristol Scout and it dramatically improved performance, easily beating the competing Sunbeam Arab. Bristol then decided to try the Jupiter in their new Badger design, finding that it, too, completely outperformed the competing ABC Dragonfly. Production of both designs for Bristol was to start immediately but the war ended only days later and the contract was cancelled.

With the ending of the war, Cosmos had no production designs and their repair work was quickly dwindling. The company was soon insolvent. Convinced of the quality of the Cosmos designs, the Air Ministry "made it be known" that they would be rather happy if the company were purchased by Bristol, which eventually took place in 1920. Sir George White later noted that they acquired the Mercury design and seven engines, all the assets of Cosmos, along with Fedden and his design team, for just £15,000. Even then most sources suggest they only did so after being persuaded to do so by the Air Ministry, which is perhaps not surprising given the fragile economy of the era.

Bristol soon found a role for the larger design, which entered production at Bristol's new engine plant in Filton as the Bristol Jupiter. The Jupiter became a commercial success and was widely used around the world, resulting in Fedden becoming one of the most highly paid engineers in Europe. After Jimmy Ellor's pioneering work at the RAE on turbosuperchargers, the Jupiter was experimentally adapted with a turbo to become the first "Orion" design, although this saw little use.

By the late 1920s, the Jupiter design was no longer competitive and Fedden and Butler started work on a pair of new designs. Both would use a supercharger, at that time a new-fangled idea, to provide boost even at ground level and thereby deliver similar power as the Jupiter's from a much smaller engine. Re-using their earlier name, this design emerged as the Bristol Mercury, while a more powerful design at the same size as the original Jupiter became the Bristol Pegasus.

== Development of sleeve valve engines ==
In 1925 and 1926, Harry Ricardo wrote a series of seminal papers at the RAE claiming that the poppet valve system was already operating at its peak capability, and that any future engines would have to use sleeve valves instead. Fedden and Butler immediately turned to such a design, adapting the Mercury to become the Bristol Aquila, and the Pegasus as the Bristol Perseus. However, both of these engines quickly found themselves at the "low end" of the power spectrum as ever-larger aircraft designs demanded ever-larger engines to power them.

To solve this problem, the two designs were quickly adapted to two-row configurations, resulting in the Bristol Taurus and the superb Bristol Hercules. Not one to rest on his laurels, Fedden then started adapting the Hercules into a two-row 18-cylinder design as the Bristol Centaurus.

The Taurus was in service when World War II started in 1939, but the Hercules was still in testing. Work on the Centaurus was suspended while the final problems with Hercules production were worked out. The entire Bristol sleeve-valve range would see widespread service throughout the war on a wide variety of designs. They were so successful that the Air Ministry forced a reluctant Bristol to help with the high-power Napier Sabre project that had bogged down due to problems with their sleeves.

With Hercules production in full swing in 1941, Fedden returned to the Centaurus. Production was able to start in 1942, but at the time there were few aircraft that could be adapted to a 2,500 hp engine. Newer designs intended to mount engines of this size appeared near the end of the war, notably certain versions of the Hawker Tempest, taking over from the Sabre in that design.

Even as the Centaurus was beginning to enter production, Fedden began considering the need for an even larger design. At the time he pitched this for very large, long-range bombers and patrol aircraft, but he stated throughout development from late 1941 that the ultimate goal was the transatlantic airline market. This led to the Orion concept, originally an enlarged Centaurus of about 4,000 hp. They also considered a four-row design with 28 cylinders, but little work on that model was carried out.

For his role in creating some of the most successful aircraft engines of the era, Fedden was knighted in 1942.

== Later war and after ==
The stress of wartime production needs had taken its toll on Leonard Butler, who left the company to recuperate. Although Fedden had created a long line of hugely successful engines for Bristol, he had fought constantly with management over funding priorities. Without Butler's influence it seems Fedden "had enough", and shortly after being knighted, he left Bristol to take up a variety of positions within the Government. For much of the remainder of the war, he travelled in the United States with another Bristol employee, Ian Duncan, to study US production line techniques to improve their own.

In 1945 Fedden led a Ministry of Aircraft Production (MAP) mission to examine German aeronautical expertise and research. In the course of this, known as the "Fedden Mission", he visited the V-2 production centre and labour camps at Nordhausen. He wrote several articles on German engine design and production concepts, and concluded generally that the German engines were lacking in supercharger design and power-per-volume compared to British types, although their fuel injection systems and single-lever controls were excellent.

On his return Fedden, together with Duncan, set up Roy Fedden Ltd. in 1945. The company was provided sixty Volkswagen Type 1s by Major Ivan Hirst but was unable to sell any in the anti-German postwar climate and difficult economic conditions. The company's first product, the Fedden O-325, was a small horizontally opposed fuel injected six cylinder sleeve valve aeroengine intended for helicopters or for submerged wing installation in aircraft. It was technically superior to any flat-four or -six produced in the U.S. and was being considered for the American Ercoupe. The engine did not progress beyond development as "Roy Fedden Limited" went into liquidation in June 1947. Fedden then turned to a new 1,350 hp (1,010 kW; 1,370 PS) turboprop design, the Cotswold, meant to be installed within the wings of aircraft in either tractor or pusher configuration, Bill Gunston shows three different schemes, all tractor nacelle installations. The Cotswold engine did not progress beyond the design stage. Finally they decided to design their own car, powered by a three-cylinder air-cooled radial, but they found it had vibration and overheating problems and tended to skid badly when being cornered hard. Work started on a replacement chassis, but the rest of the company's engineers lost interest and left, and soon the company had to be dissolved.

After this, Fedden worked for a time consulting with George Dowty, but soon retired and spent his time teaching at the College of Aeronautics at Cranfield University.

Fedden was childless. He has sometimes been mistakenly described as the father of a prominent British artist, Mary Fedden. He was her uncle.
