= Lodge Causeway =

Road in Bristol, England

Coordinates: 51.475°N 2.532°W

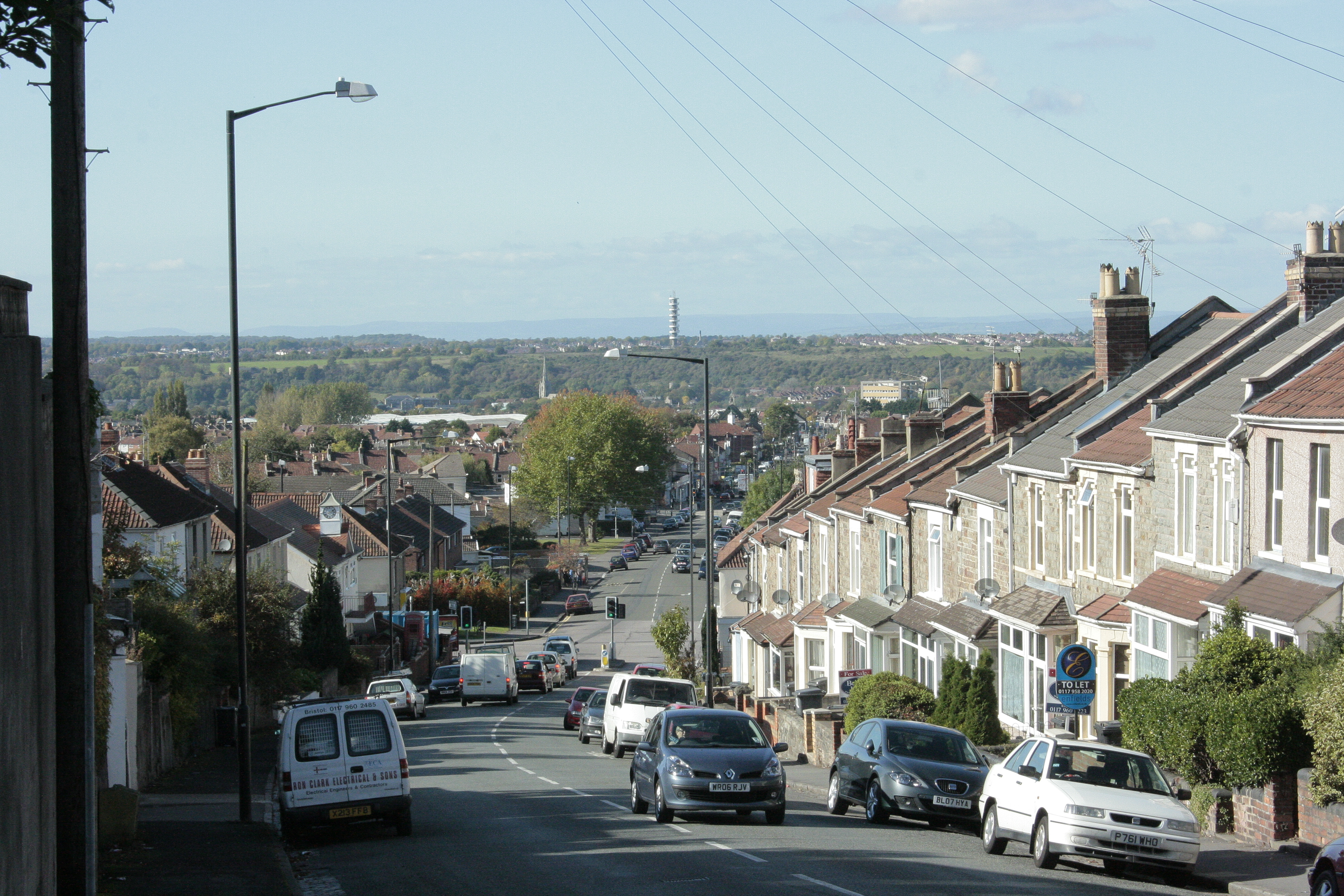
Lodge Causeway visible beyond traffic lights from Lodge Hill

Lodge Causeway is an ancient passage through the former Royal Forest of Kingswood and now the main road between Fishponds and Kingswood in Bristol, England. The road is designated the B4048.

The Causeway led to Kingswood Lodge at the top of Lodge Hill, recorded in use since Saxon times when kings used the forest for hunting whilst resident at the palace at Pucklechurch, where King Edmund was murdered by an outlaw in 946. It passes through the Fishponds suburbs of Hillfields, Mayfield Park and Chester Park.
