= Grade I listed buildings in South Gloucestershire =

Gloucestershire shown in England

There are over 9,000 Grade I listed buildings in England. This page is a list of these buildings in the district of South Gloucestershire within Gloucestershire.

== South Gloucestershire ==
Name	Location	Type	Completed (Note: The date given is the date used by Historic England as significant for the initial building or that of an important part in the structure's description.)	Date designated	Grid ref. (Note: The grid reference is based on the British national grid reference system, sometimes known as OSGB36, used by the Ordnance Survey.) Geo-coordinates	Entry number (Note: The "List Entry Number" is a unique number assigned to each listed building and scheduled monument by Historic England.)	Image
Church of St Mary	Almondsbury, South Gloucestershire	Parish Church	Late 12th century	30 March 1960	ST6034884085; 51°33′15″N 2°34′24″W	1128858	Church of St Mary More images
Severn Bridge and Aust Viaduct First Severn Crossing	Aust	Suspension Bridge	1961-1966	29 May 1998	ST5654089830; 51°36′20″N 2°37′44″W	1119760	Severn Bridge and Aust Viaduct First Severn Crossing More images
Badminton House	Badminton Park, Badminton	Country House	Late 1660s to 1690s	17 September 1952	ST8066682913; 51°32′41″N 2°16′49″W	1320832	Badminton House More images
Church of St Michael and All Angels	Badminton Park, Badminton	Anglican Church	1785	3 March 1961	ST8068682866; 51°32′40″N 2°16′48″W	1155177	Church of St Michael and All Angels More images
Parish Church of St Mary	Bitton	Parish Church	Anglo Saxon origins	11 May 1953	ST6819469334; 51°25′20″N 2°27′32″W	1116770	Parish Church of St Mary More images
Church of St James	Charfield	Church	Redundant	30 March 1960	ST7190091098; 51°37′05″N 2°24′26″W	1321189	Church of St James More images
Church of Holy Trinity	Cold Ashton	Parish Church	14th century	15 August 1985	ST7510372737; 51°27′11″N 2°21′35″W	1220484	Church of Holy Trinity More images
Garden Walls and Gateways about 15m South of the Manor House	Cold Ashton	Gate	Early 17th century	17 September 1952	ST7501372614; 51°27′07″N 2°21′40″W	1290769	Garden Walls and Gateways about 15m South of the Manor House More images
The Manor House	Cold Ashton	House	c 1570-75	17 September 1952	ST7500472638; 51°27′08″N 2°21′40″W	1220865	The Manor House More images
Parish Church of St Andrew	Cromhall	Anglican Church	1852	30 March 1960	ST6922290501; 51°36′45″N 2°26′45″W	1114974	Parish Church of St Andrew More images
Church of St Mary	Dodington Park, Dodington	Church (private)	Medieval	15 August 1985	ST7520979880; 51°31′02″N 2°21′31″W	1211173	Upload Photo
Dodington House	Dodington Park, Dodington	House	1796-1816	17 September 1952	ST7525079860; 51°31′02″N 2°21′29″W	1211169	Dodington House More images
Dower House	Dodington Park, Dodington	Dower House	Between 1796 and 1816	17 September 1952	ST7521979938; 51°31′04″N 2°21′31″W	1290138	Upload Photo
Orangery attached to North West of Dodington House	Dodington Park, Dodington	Orangery	1799	15 August 1985	ST7522079873; 51°31′02″N 2°21′31″W	1211172	Upload Photo
Stables	Dodington Park, Dodington	Courtyard	1796-1816	17 September 1952	ST7517979918; 51°31′03″N 2°21′33″W	1290139	Upload Photo
Church of St Peter	Dyrham Park, Dyrham and Hinton	Parish Church	Mid 13th century	15 August 1985	ST7414475804; 51°28′50″N 2°22′25″W	1289711	Church of St Peter More images
Dyrham House	Dyrham Park, Dyrham and Hinton	Country House	Tudor	17 September 1952	ST7418075766; 51°28′49″N 2°22′24″W	1212039	Dyrham House More images
Orangery attached to South East of Dyrham House	Dyrham Park, Dyrham and Hinton	Glasshouse	1701	15 August 1985	ST7418375734; 51°28′48″N 2°22′23″W	1212042	Orangery attached to South East of Dyrham House More images
Stable Block attached to South of Dyrham House	Dyrham Park, Dyrham and Hinton	Stables	1698	15 August 1985	ST7415275729; 51°28′48″N 2°22′25″W	1289719	Stable Block attached to South of Dyrham House More images
Church of St Michael and All Angels	Little Badminton, Hawkesbury	Church	Early 13th century	3 March 1961	ST8017084252; 51°33′24″N 2°17′15″W	1303100	Church of St Michael and All Angels More images
Parish Church of St Mary the Virgin	Hawkesbury	Church	13th century	3 March 1961	ST7681986925; 51°34′51″N 2°20′09″W	1320866	Parish Church of St Mary the Virgin More images
Swangrove House, Garden Walls, 4 Corner Pavilions and Gate Piers	Swangrove, Hawkesbury	House	1703	17 September 1952	ST7970585752; 51°34′13″N 2°17′39″W	1129379	Upload Photo
Ambulatory 20m south-west of Horton Court	Horton	Loggia	c1527-1529	17 September 1952	ST7661584989; 51°33′48″N 2°20′20″W	1321166	Ambulatory 20m south-west of Horton Court
Horton Court	Horton	Clergy House	c. 1140	17 September 1952	ST7662285029; 51°33′49″N 2°20′19″W	1114992	Horton Court More images
Parish Church of St James the Elder	Horton	Anglican Church	16th century	3 March 1961	ST7660085035; 51°33′49″N 2°20′20″W	1114993	Parish Church of St James the Elder More images
Acton Court and Gateway and Flank Walls 40m East	Iron Acton	Farmhouse	1680	9 February 2011	ST6771084203; 51°33′21″N 2°28′02″W	1320155	Acton Court and Gateway and Flank Walls 40m East More images
Church of St James the Less	Iron Acton	Anglican Church	1879	27 November 1984	ST6806583452; 51°32′57″N 2°27′43″W	1320130	Church of St James the Less More images
Little Sodbury Manor	Little Sodbury	Manor House	Early 15th century	17 September 1952	ST7598082897; 51°32′40″N 2°20′52″W	1115005	Upload Photo
Parish Church of St Mary	Marshfield	Parish church	12th century	3 March 1961	ST7821473677; 51°27′42″N 2°18′54″W	1129438	Parish Church of St Mary More images
Anglican Church of St Thomas à Becket / Church of St Thomas of Canterbury	Pucklechurch	Parish Church	Norman origin	15 August 1985	ST6992576533; 51°29′13″N 2°26′04″W	1212871	Anglican Church of St Thomas à Becket / Church of St Thomas of Canterbury More images
Parish Church of St Anne	Siston	Church	Mid 12th century	11 May 1953	ST6885475232; 51°28′31″N 2°26′59″W	1278090	Parish Church of St Anne More images
Siston Court	Siston	House	Mid C20	11 May 1953	ST6866175361; 51°28′35″N 2°27′09″W	1231511	Siston Court More images
Parish Church of St John the Baptist	Chipping Sodbury	Parish Church	Early English	29 July 1983	ST7274882301; 51°32′20″N 2°23′40″W	1129307	Parish Church of St John the Baptist More images
Church of St Mary the Virgin	Thornbury	Church	1764	30 March 1960	ST6340090620; 51°36′48″N 2°31′48″W	1128789	Church of St Mary the Virgin More images
Outer Court of Thornbury Castle and Wall of Kitchen Court	Thornbury	Castle	1511-1521	21 September 1952	ST6331490720; 51°36′51″N 2°31′52″W	1321132	Outer Court of Thornbury Castle and Wall of Kitchen Court
Thornbury Castle, Inner Court	Thornbury	Castle	1510-1521	21 September 1952	ST6336590701; 51°36′50″N 2°31′50″W	1128788	Thornbury Castle, Inner Court
Walls enclosing Privy Garden immediately to South of the Inner Court of Thornbury Castle	Thornbury	Wall	1511-21	21 September 1952	ST6343390678; 51°36′49″N 2°31′46″W	1312668	Walls enclosing Privy Garden immediately to South of the Inner Court of Thornbury Castle
Bath Lodge	Dodington Ash, Tormarton	Lodge	1796-1816	17 September 1952	ST7582378492; 51°30′17″N 2°20′59″W	1214012	Bath Lodge More images
Church of St Mary Magdelene	Tormarton	Parish Church	Norman	15 August 1985	ST7695178847; 51°30′29″N 2°20′01″W	1213492	Church of St Mary Magdelene More images
Church of St James the Great	Westerleigh	Parish Church	13th century	15 August 1985	ST6995279653; 51°30′54″N 2°26′04″W	1215174	Church of St James the Great More images
Church of St James the Great	Abson, Wick and Abson	Parish Church	12th century	15 August 1985	ST7053174845; 51°28′18″N 2°25′32″W	1216114	Church of St James the Great More images
Wick Court	Wick and Abson	House	Later	17 September 1952	ST7005672665; 51°27′08″N 2°25′56″W	1216153	Wick Court More images
Church of St Michael	Winterbourne	Anglican Church	Mid-late 19th century	3 March 1961	ST6413781006; 51°31′37″N 2°31′06″W	1321086	Church of St Michael More images
Parish Church of St Mary the Virgin	Yate	Anglican Church	1859	3 March 1961	ST7137082815; 51°32′37″N 2°24′51″W	1128753	Parish Church of St Mary the Virgin More images
Whitfield's Tabernacle	Park Road, Bristol	Chapel	1741	6 June 1951	ST6493173903; 51°27′47″N 2°30′22″W	1116201	Whitfield's Tabernacle More images
