= Frome Valley Walkway =

Footpath in England

Coordinates: 51.485°N 2.548°W

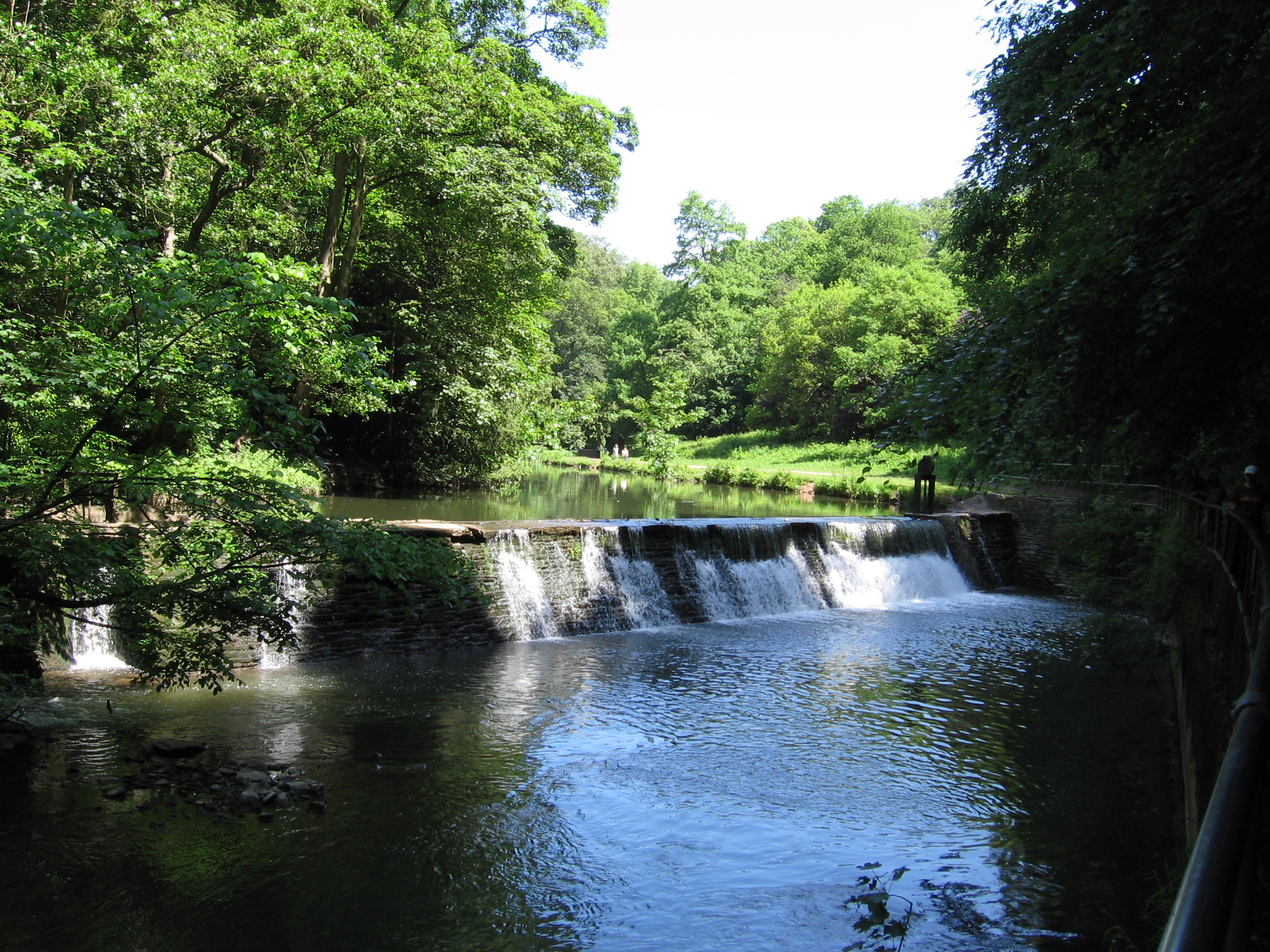
- Part of the Frome Valley Walkway: a weir with sluice gates on the River Frome at Oldbury Court
- Length: 18 mi (29 km)
- Location: Southern England
- Trailheads: Bristol; Cotswolds
- Use: Hiking

The Frome Valley Walkway is an 18-mile (29 km) footpath which follows the River Frome from the River Avon in the centre of Bristol to the Cotswold Hills in South Gloucestershire. The path also links the Cotswold Way National Trail at one end with the Avon Walkway at the other.

Starting in Bristol's Castle Park, the path skirts public parks in the city, where the river is culverted, and only becomes rural as it passes through Eastville Park. The walk then continues past Snuff Mills and on to the Oldbury Court Estate, passing beneath Frenchay Common, then to Cleeve Bridge before passing under the M4 motorway at Hambrook. Next, the path passes through Winterbourne Down, and under the Winterbourne Viaduct.

The path continues through parkland to Frampton Cotterell, then south of Iron Acton before it reaches Yate and the Goose Green Fields Nature Area. A large section of the walkway is along suburban pavement here, before the final stretch of fields leading to Old Sodbury where the Walkway officially ends.

It is, however, possible to continue along the Cotswold Way to Tormarton, past the source of the Frome, where there are views from the top of the escarpment.

== Wildlife ==
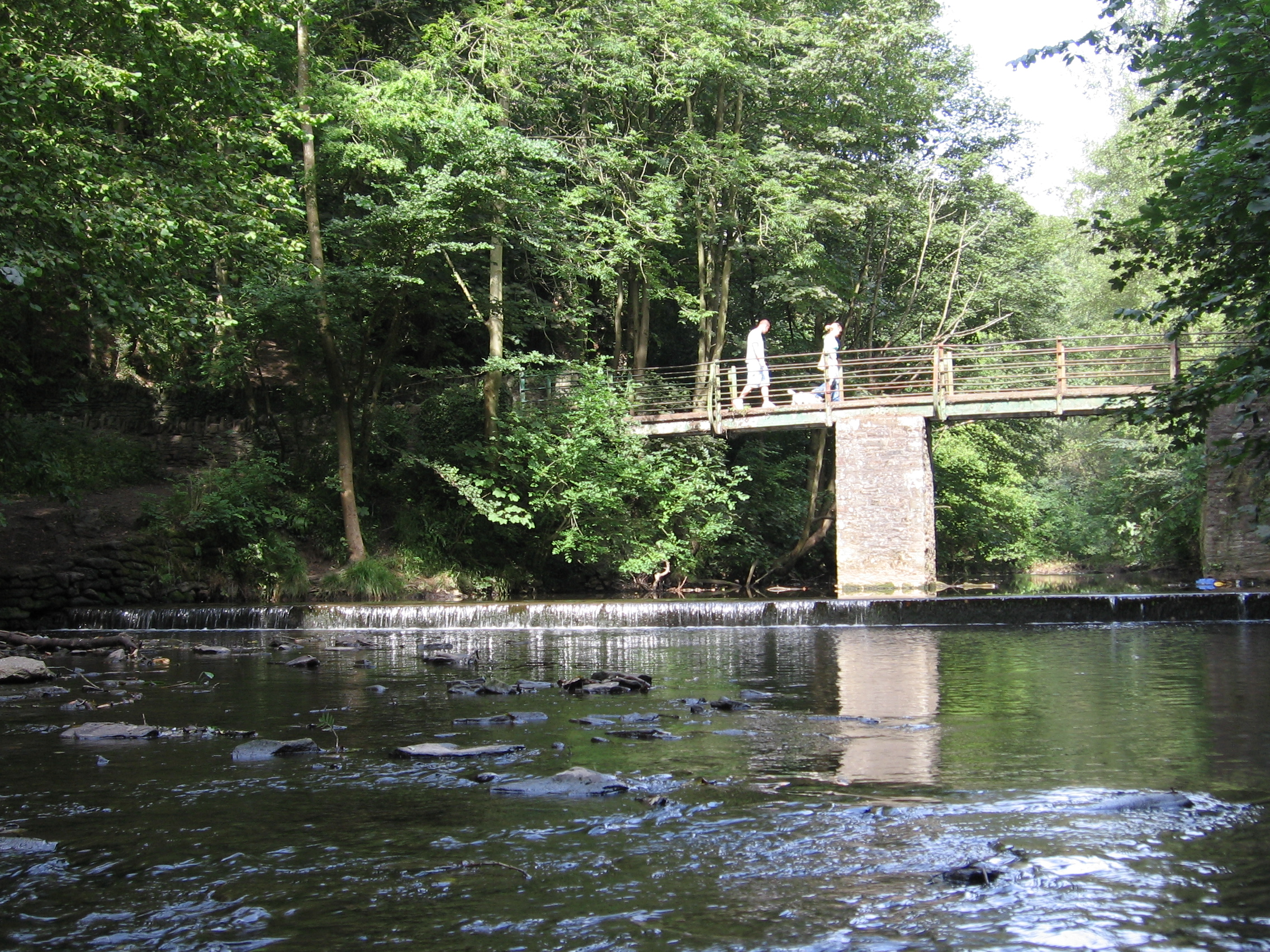
A footbridge over the Frome, near Snuff Mills.

The Frome Valley is an important place for wildlife, because it provides a green corridor of freshwater habitats, woodlands, parks and open spaces cutting through the built-up areas in Bristol and the towns and farmlands of South Gloucestershire. The valley has a range of animals, birds and plants, some of which are otherwise rarely seen so close to the city.

One of the last British populations of the endangered native white-clawed crayfish in the Bristol area was found in the river, but became extinct in 2008.

Birds that can be seen along the walkway include the kingfisher, dipper, treecreeper, house martin, grey wagtail, nuthatch and other more common species.

A number of species of bat are also found at dusk on the Frome, including common pipistrelle, Daubenton's bat and common noctule.

The plant life that can be seen, particularly at Huckford Quarry beneath the Winterbourne Viaduct, includes polypod ferns, hart's-tongue fern, stitchwort, yellow archangel, and wood anemone.
