= Winterbourne, Gloucestershire =

Village in Gloucestershire, England

Coordinates: 51.524°N 2.502°W

Winterbourne
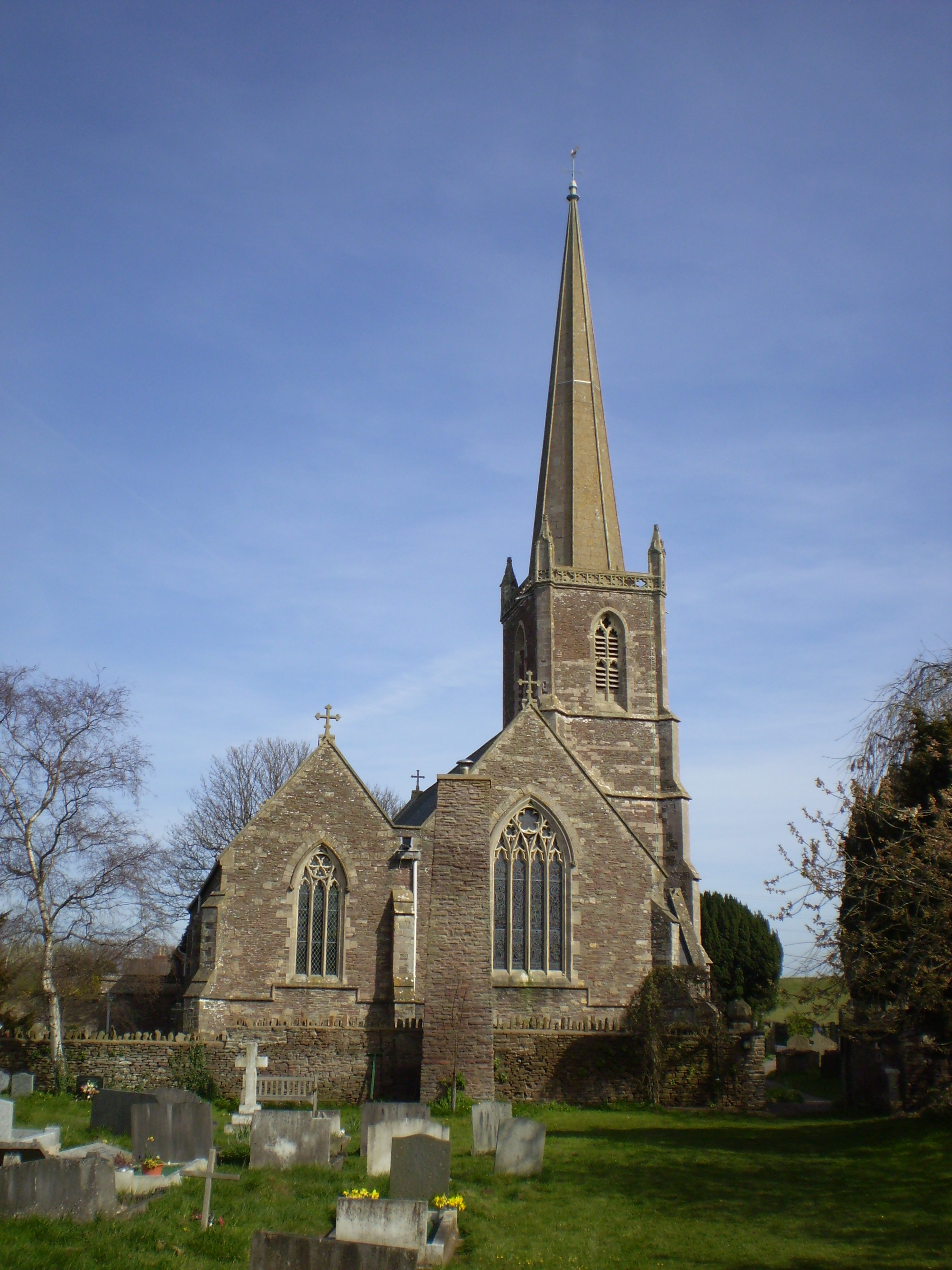
- The parish church of St Michael the Archangel

- Location within Gloucestershire
- Population: 10,250 (2021 Census)
- OS grid reference: ST653807
- Civil parish: Winterbourne
- Unitary authority: South Gloucestershire
- Ceremonial county: Gloucestershire
- Region: South West
- Country: England
- Sovereign state: United Kingdom
- Post town: BRISTOL
- Postcode district: BS16, BS36
- Dialling code: 01454
- Police: Avon and Somerset
- Fire: Avon
- Ambulance: South Western
- UK Parliament: Filton and Bradley Stoke

Winterbourne is a large village and civil parish in the South Gloucestershire district, in the ceremonial county of Gloucestershire, England, lying just beyond the north fringe of Bristol. The parish of Winterbourne is centred on the village and includes the neighbouring communities of Winterbourne Down, Whiteshill, Hambrook, Frenchay and Watley's End. To the north-east is the village of Frampton Cotterell and to the west lies the town of Bradley Stoke. The parish had a population of 10,250 at the 2021 census.

== History ==
Winterbourne was recorded in the Domesday Book as Wintreborne, meaning 'Winter Stream'. The village is believed to have derived its name from the nearby Bradley Brook, as much of medieval Winterbourne was originally built up around St Michael's Church, which stands near the river.

The modern village is largely built on top of a hill, with woodlands and fields encompassing its urban features. The River Frome flows through a valley between the village and nearby Frampton Cotterell, continuing on towards Frenchay, and eventually draining via Mylne's Culvert, into the tidal Bristol Avon New Cut, to the east of what is now Gaol Ferry Bridge. The Bradley Brook divides Winterbourne from Bradley Stoke and Stoke Gifford to the west, before flowing into the Frome at Hambrook. Since the 1960s, the M4 motorway has bypassed the village to the southwest.

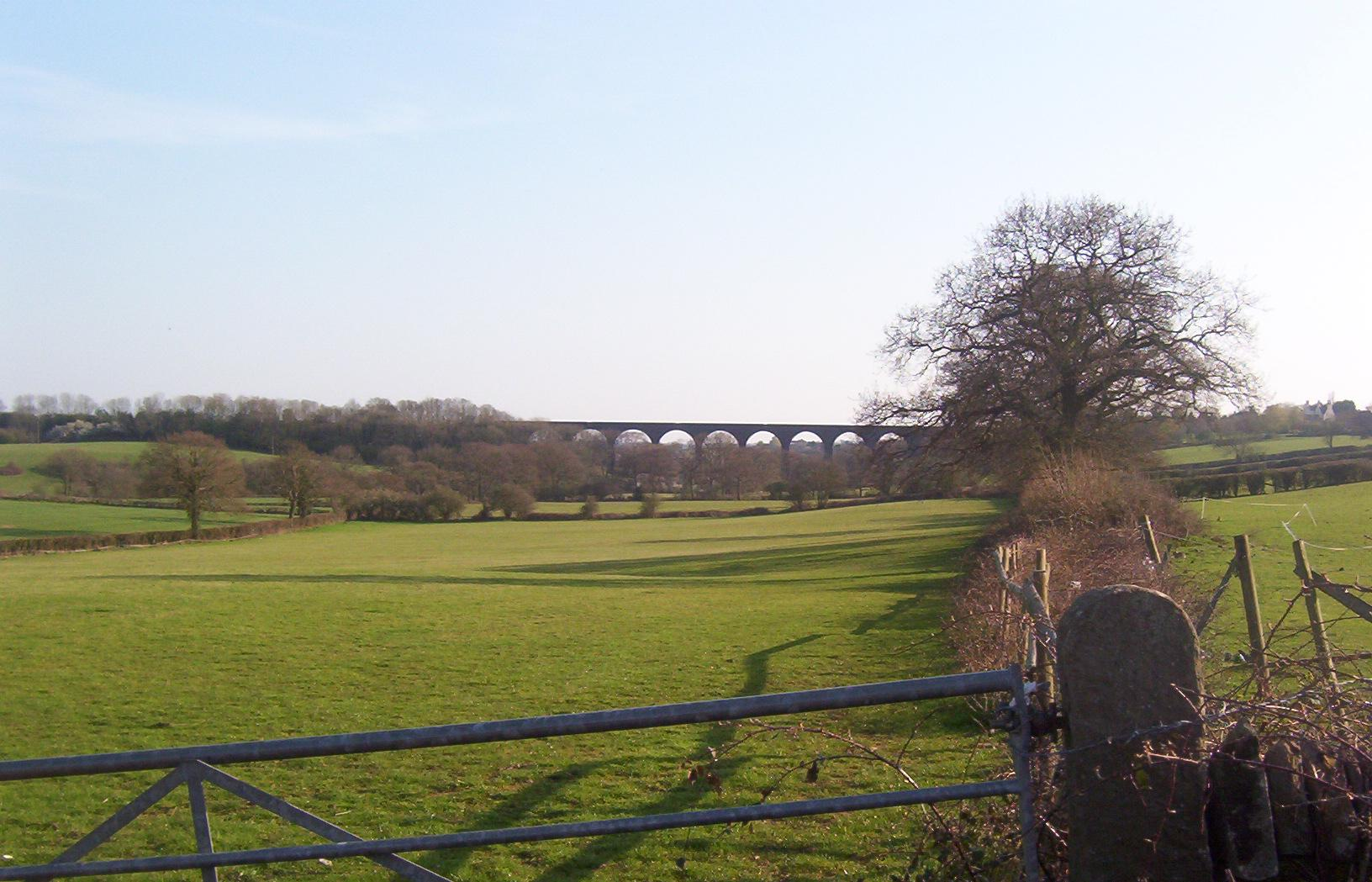
Looking towards the Huckford Viaduct and Frome Valley from Cloisters

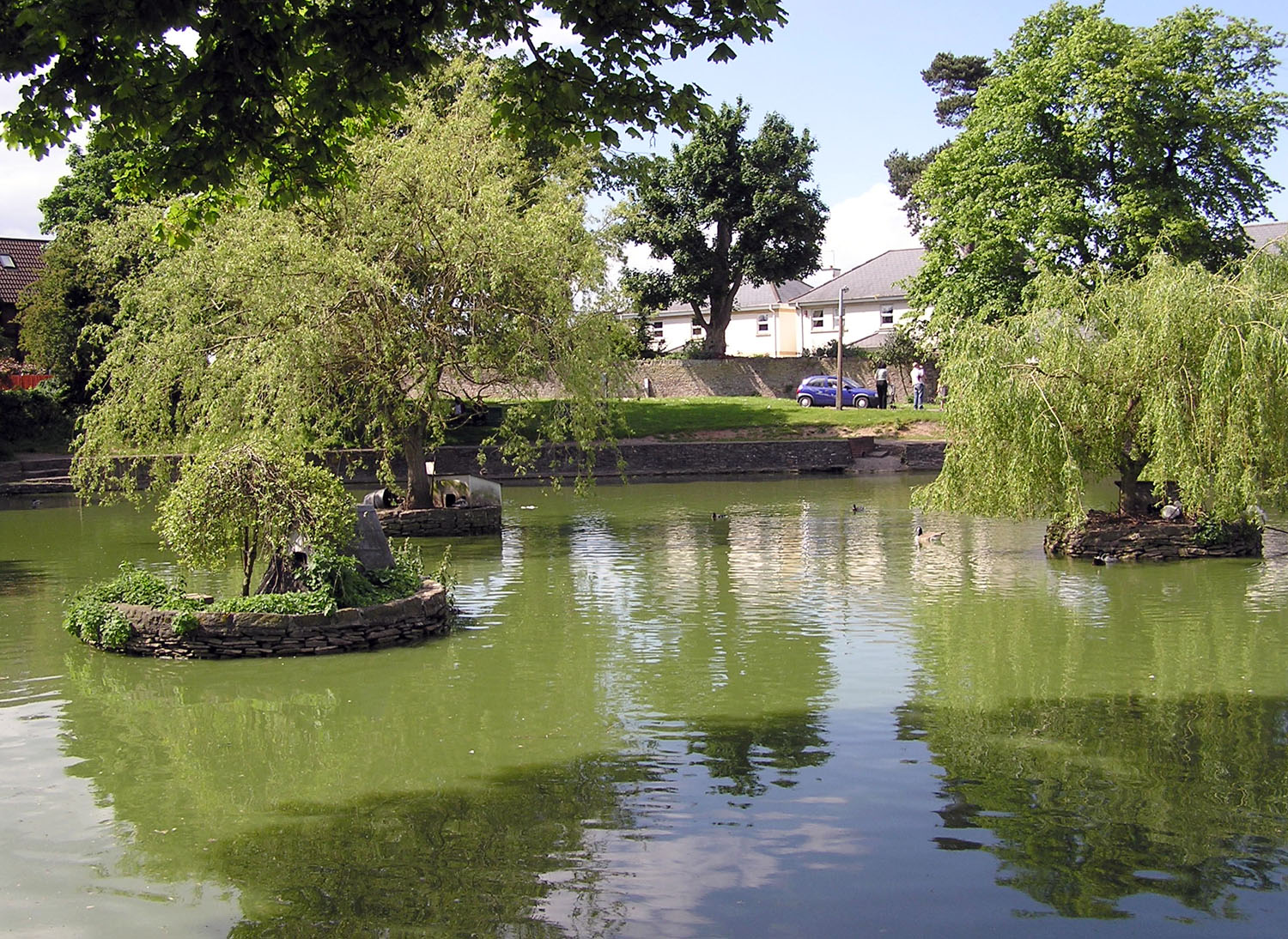
The village pond, home to ducks and swans. Shelter for the ducks is provided on the islands.

The Huckford Viaduct carries the Great Western Railway over the River Frome. Beneath the viaduct is the abandoned Huckford Quarry, a public nature reserve. Winterbourne is known for its large duck pond, which overlooks the Frome Valley and is a common spot for fishing and feeding the ducks and swans.

The parish church is St Michael's, a building dating from the 12th century, which celebrated its 800th anniversary in 1998. St Michael's sits amid fields, flanked by cottages, with its prominent spire visible for miles around. At the altar is a stone depiction of the Last Supper, based on the painting by Leonardo da Vinci. Winterbourne Court Farm Barn is immediately adjacent to the church. This is a Grade II* listed 14th century tithe barn and is an outstanding example of its type.

== Amenities ==
Winterbourne has a number of pubs including the George and Dragon, the Swan and the Mason's Arms. In recent years, a number of the village's pubs have become restaurants; two of which now serve Indian cuisine. The village has three social hubs: St Michael's Rooms, Fromeside Community Centre and Greenfield, which host clubs, functions and other public events. Salem, the local Methodist church, is in Watley's End.

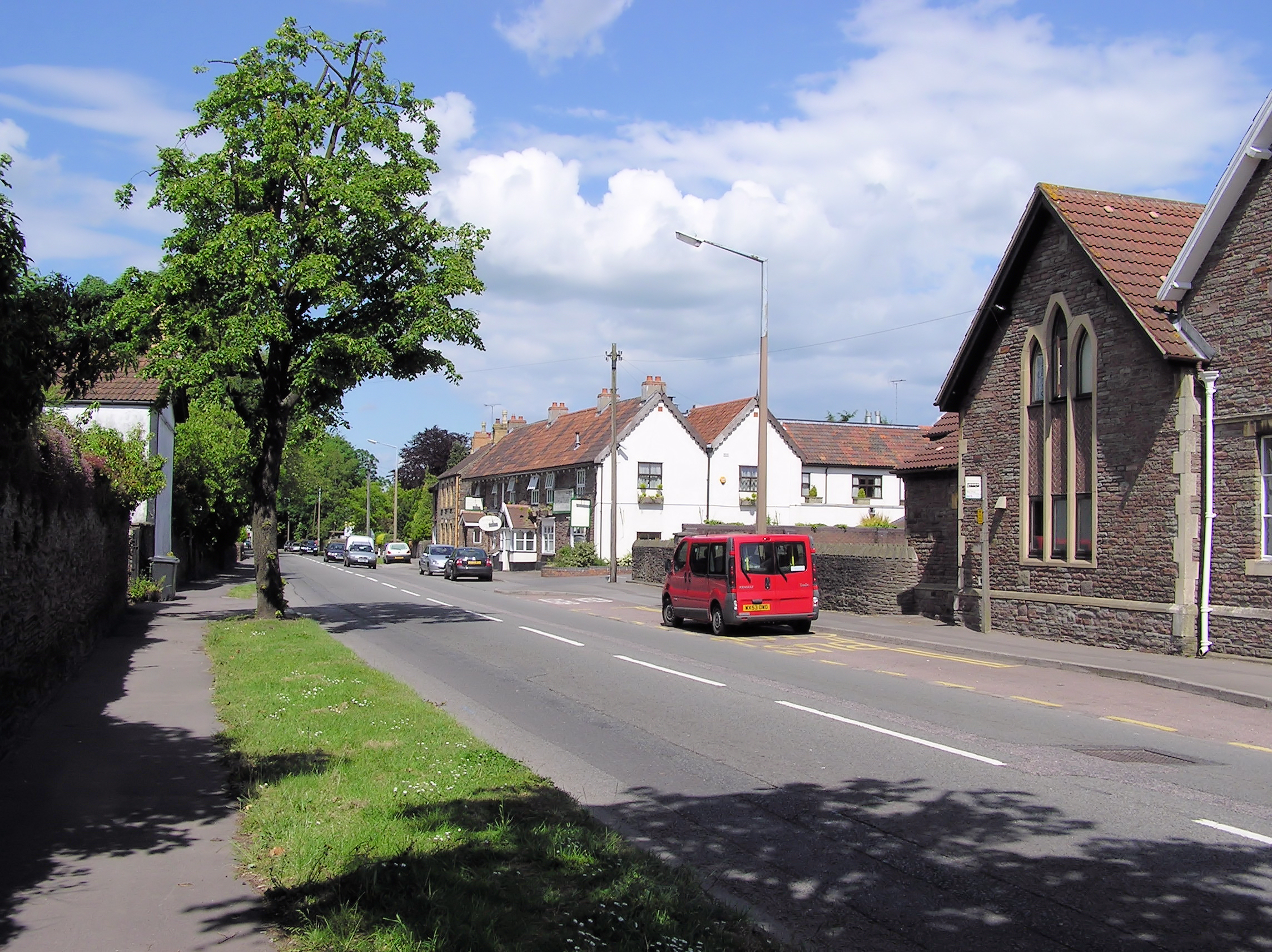
The High Street

Winterbourne contains branches of the Co-op and Tesco Express, a chemist, optician, a handful of dental practices and a library. Other village amenities include a bakery, butcher and a Post Office serving the community. Horses and cattle are a common sight in the fields, including in the Cloisters area, which has views of the Frome Valley and the Huckford Viaduct.

== Governance ==
An electoral ward in the same name exists. This ward stretches from Winterbourne in the north west to Hambrook in the southeast. The total population of the ward taken at the 2011 census was 6,994.

== Schools ==
Winterbourne contains several schools. The main primary schools are Elm Park and St Michael's, with most students going on to attend the nearby secondary school, Winterbourne Academy, originally named The Ridings High School when formally opened by Tony Benn in 1957. Silverhill School and Day Nursery is an independent preparatory school for children aged 6 months to 11 years. St Michael's was founded in 1813 by the abolitionists and educational reformers, Hannah More and William Wilberforce. The original school was located upstairs in the George and Dragon pub. Larger rooms were then provided in Bourne House, where the school remained until a permanent building was erected on the High Street. St Michael's present location on Linden Close was opened in 1970. St Michael's alumna, J. K. Rowling, is reputed to have based much of her character, Albus Dumbledore, on Alfred Dunn, who was headmaster during her studies.

== Notable residents ==
- Arthur Austen-Leigh, vicar and cricketer, was Rector of Winterbourne from 1875 to 1890; he lived in Winterbourne with his children, including writer Lois Austen-Leigh
- Tim Bowles, politician and first Mayor of the West of England.
- James Bracey, Gloucestershire and England cricketer.
- Edward Colston, merchant, slave trader and Member of Parliament, is believed to have spent much of his childhood in Winterbourne.
- Joe Fry, racing driver, was born in Winterbourne in 1915.
- Harry Grindell Matthews, inventor, was born in Winterbourne in 1880. His childhood home was located at what is now The Grove Residential Home for the Elderly on the High Street where there is a blue plaque commemorating this link.
- Dan Norris, MP and second Mayor of the West of England.
- J. K. Rowling, author of the Harry Potter books, lived in Winterbourne until she was nine years old. Potter's surname originated from some of her friends in the village.

== Sport and leisure ==
Winterbourne has a Non-League football club Winterbourne United F.C. who play at Parkside Avenue and a popular village cricket club that fields 5 senior sides - Winterbourne CC - who share the same ground. Winterbourne Down Border Morris performs during the year at events such as wassailing, and especially on Boxing Day when they perform a Mummers play.
