= Watley's End =

Area of Winterbourne, Gloucestershire, England

Coordinates: 51.529°N 2.494°W

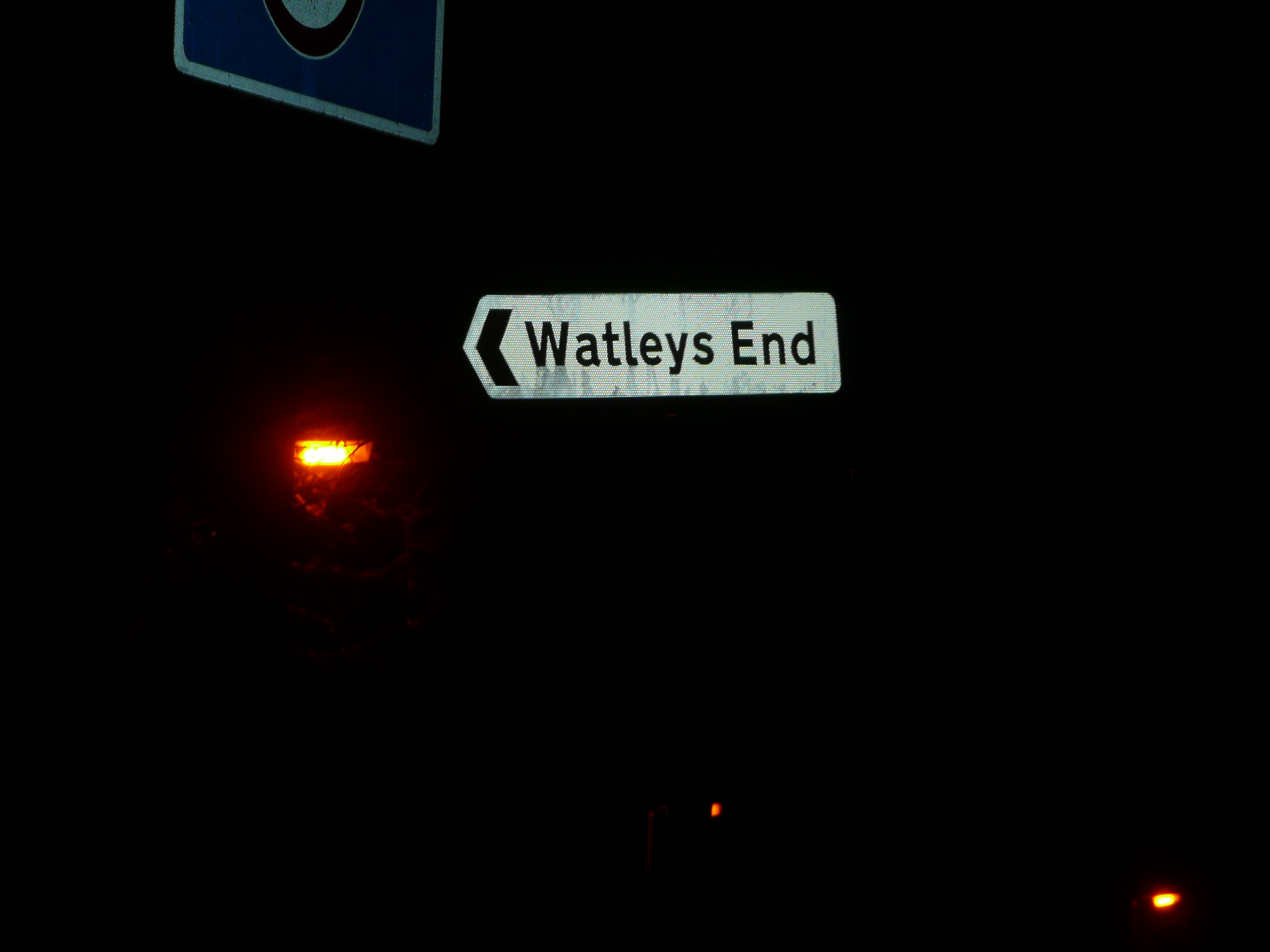
Watley's End still appears on a very few signs, such as this fingerpost at the bottom of Harcombe Hill, Winterbourne Down

Watley's End was a small village located in South Gloucestershire, England. It now forms the northern part of Winterbourne. Watley's End Road, which runs through the village, would have been the main road.

Watley's End lay sandwiched between the much larger villages of Frampton Cotterell and Winterbourne, eventually becoming part of the latter. The eastern border lay along the River Frome, from Nightingale Bridge down to the Cloisters. The northern border was considered to be Court Road and Frampton Cotterell. Hooper's Farm was considered the western edge. The southern edge of the area started where Park Avenue met North Road and continued east until the Cloisters.

The area features Salem Methodist Church and the defunct Ebenezer Methodist Church. There is also a public house called the Mason's Arms on North Road. Factory Road was named for the beaver hat factory built on what is now Beaver Close. There used to be several small shops in the area, one opposite Salem Church and another grocery shop run by Richard Maggs on the corner of Salem and Common Roads.

Watley's End is also the scene of Winterbourne's thriving Youth and Gymnastics club, at the Fromeside community centre.
