= St Michael's Church, Winterbourne =

Church in Winterbourne, Gloucestershire, England

St Michael the Archangel Church
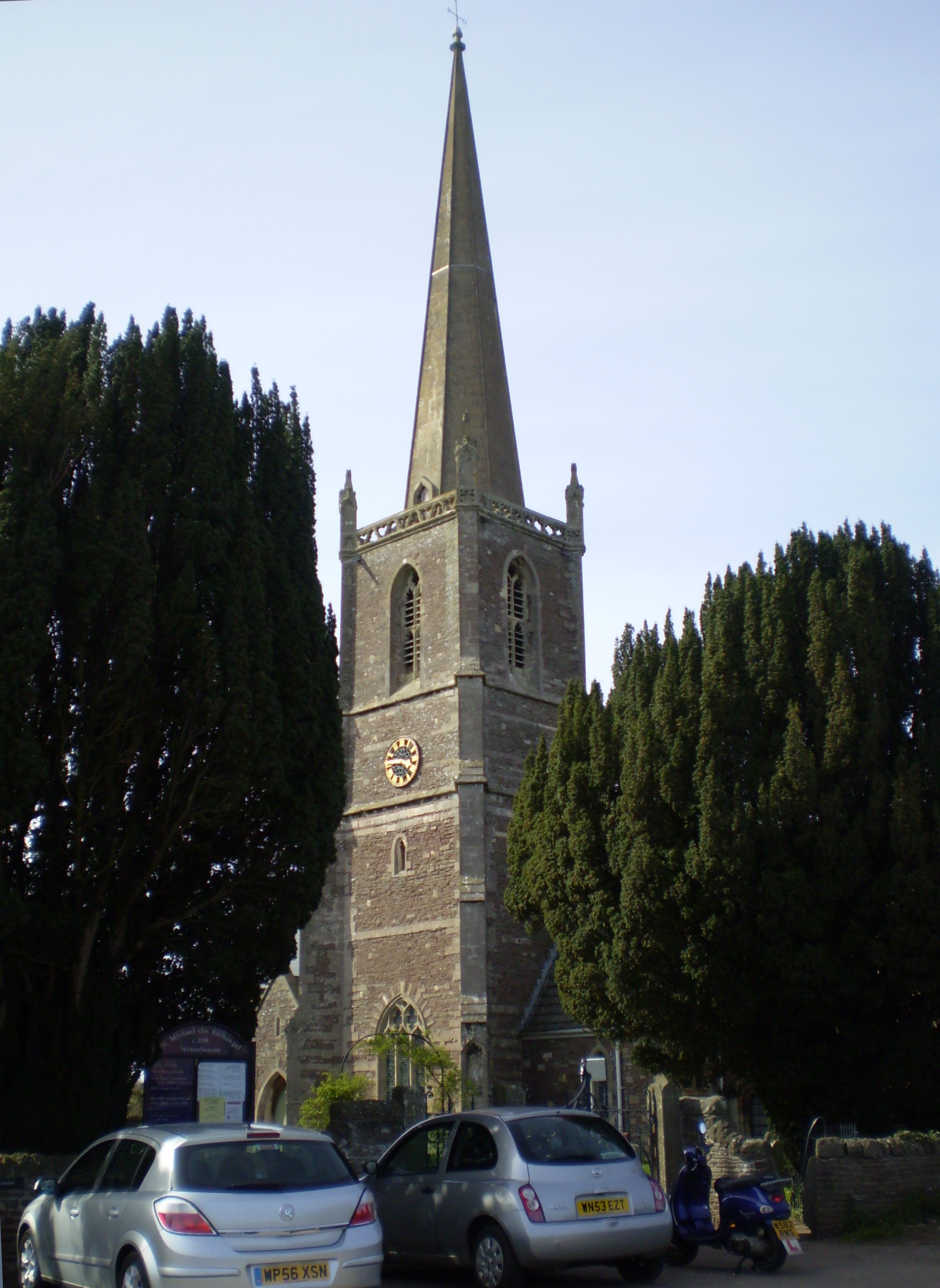

- Location within Bristol

General information
- Location: Winterbourne, Bristol, England
- Coordinates: 51.5267°N 2.5184°W
- Construction started: 12th century

St Michael the Archangel Church or simply St Michael's Church is an Anglican parish church located in Winterbourne, South Gloucestershire, on the northern fringe of Bristol. It was built in the 12th century and has been designated by English Heritage as a grade I listed building. It was partially rebuilt in 1843-7 and underwent alterations in 1877-80. In 1851 it could seat a congregation of 320.

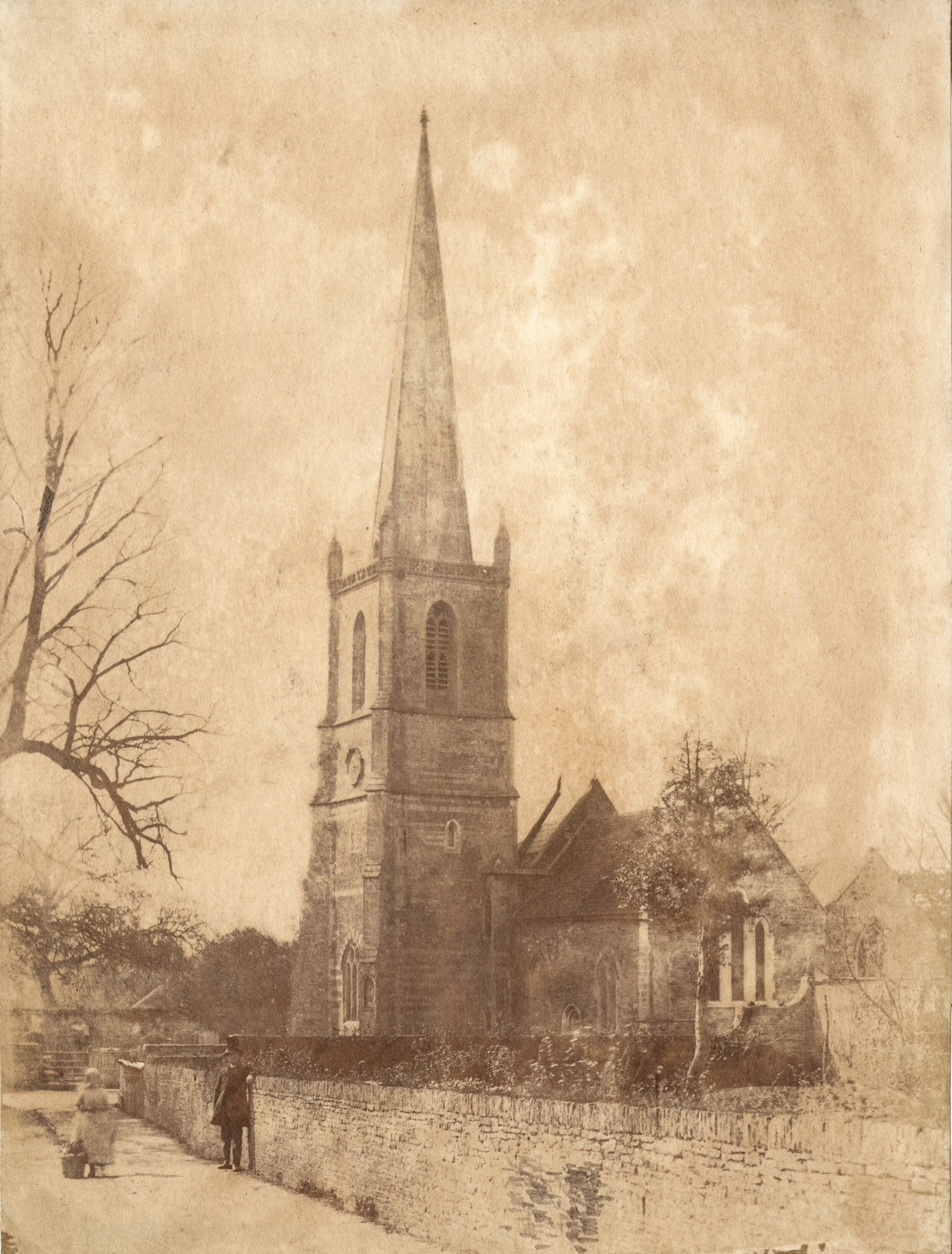
Saint Michael's Church, Winterbourne, April 1859, salted-paper print, Department of Image Collections, National Gallery of Art Library, Washington, DC

The Church is located to the west of Winterbourne, largely surrounded by fields and woodland, though a number of cottages flank it. Despite its rather isolated location its prominent spire is clearly visible for miles around. Behind the Church's most recent graveyard is the Monks Pool nature reserve and the Bradley Brook. Winterbourne Court, a 14th-century tithe barn, stands immediately adjacent to the Church.

In the churchyard's north-west corner is the war grave of a Devonshire Regiment soldier of World War II.

St Michael's is part of the Fromeside Partnership, an association between the local ecclesiastical parishes of Coalpit Heath, Frampton Cotterell, Winterbourne and Winterbourne Down.
