= Swangrove =

Country house in Hawkesbury, South Gloucestershire, England

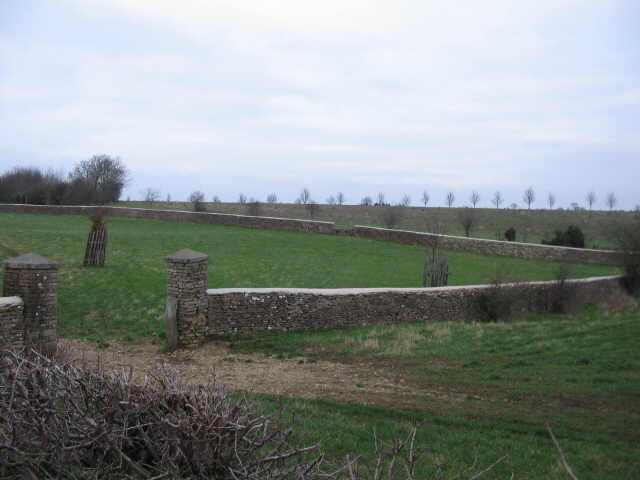
- Paddock in the grounds of Swangrove House

- Location in Gloucestershire
- 51°34′13.08″N 02°17′39.12″W
- Location: Hawkesbury, Gloucestershire, England

Swangrove is a Grade I listed country house in Hawkesbury, South Gloucestershire, England. The listing includes Swangrove House, its garden walls, four corner pavilions, and gate piers. It was built in 1703 by William Killigrew of Bath.
