= Little Sodbury Manor =

Grade I listed manor house in South Gloucestershire, United Kingdom

Coordinates: 51.5445°N 2.3478°W

- Location within Gloucestershire
- Location: Little Sodbury, Gloucestershire, England

History
- Built: c. 1450

Listed Building – Grade I
- Official name: Little Sodbury Manor
- Designated: 17 September 1952
- Reference no.: 1115005

Little Sodbury Manor is a 15th-century manor house in Little Sodbury, Gloucestershire, England. It is a Grade I listed building.

== History ==
The lords of the manor in the 14th century were the Stanshaw family and one of them began the building of the wooden manor house. In the 15th century a new stone building was constructed incorporating some of the fabric from the earlier building.

In the 16th century Little Sodbury Manor was the home of Sir John Walsh who employed William Tyndale as chaplain and tutor to his grandchildren in 1522–3; by tradition he began his translation of the Bible in his bedroom here.

In 1535, King Henry VIII conducted his second Royal Progress and, after leaving Acton Court on or around 23 August, made for Little Sodbury Manor, arriving the same day and staying for two nights before heading to Bromham House.

In 1556 the house was damaged by an electrical storm, which killed Sir John Walsh's son Maurice and his family. In 1608 it was sold to Thomas Stephens whose son demolished the southern gatehouse and some of the outbuildings. He also installed a new staircase and continued the remodelling of the interior.

Robert Packer of Donnington Castle bought Little Sodbury Manor in 1728, following further storm damage in 1703 after which the house was remodelled. It then passed down through absentee landlords and by the 19th century had fallen into disrepair.

The Duke of Beaufort inherited the house in 1910 and sold it to Lord Hugh Grosvenor and in 1919 Baron de Tuyll. They employed the architect Sir Harold Brakspear for restoration.

== Architecture ==
The stone building has Cotswold stone slates on the roof. The Great Hall, cross passage and porch remain from the 15th- and 16th-century building. The kitchen and south-west wing are from the 16th century. To the north is the two-storey, five-bay wing from the 17th century.

The hall roof is supported by original timbers resting on corbels carved as shield-bearing angels, with four tiers of carved windbraces. The hall screen is original but the timber framing above this was added to create separate rooms.

The grounds include a grassed terrace with hedges and stone walls and a Tudor bowling green. There are extensive grassed areas, planted with trees including Scots pine, birch, copper hazel, blue cedar and handkerchief trees, surrounding the house. Little can now be seen of the ponds in the north-west corner of the garden.
