= Little Sodbury =

Village in South Gloucestershire, England

Coordinates: 51°32′46″N 02°21′05″W

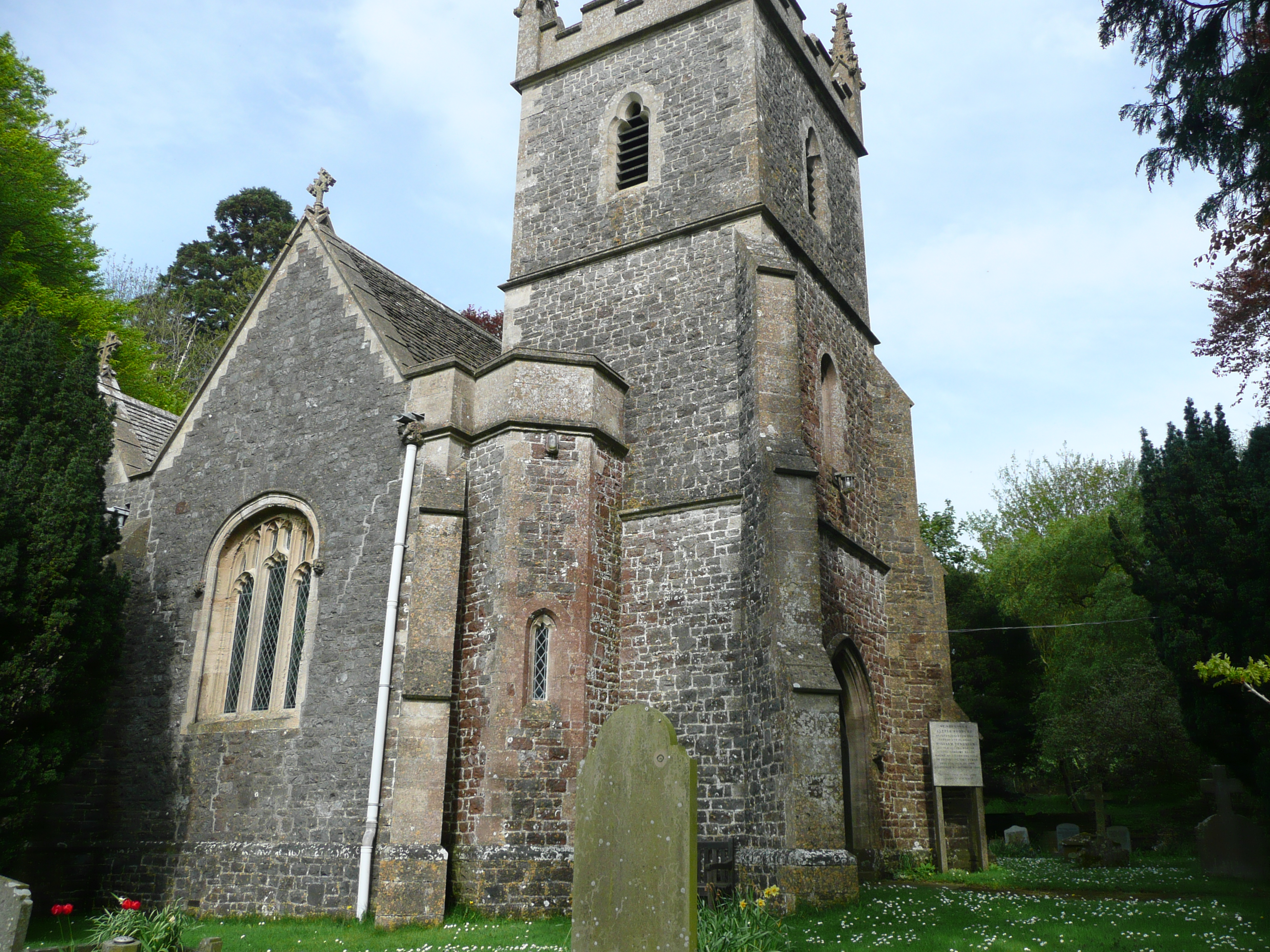
- The church of St Adeline, Little Sodbury

- Location within Gloucestershire
- Population: 107 (2021 Census)
- OS grid reference: ST726822
- Civil parish: Horton
- Unitary authority: South Gloucestershire
- Ceremonial county: Gloucestershire
- Region: South West
- Country: England
- Sovereign state: United Kingdom
- Post town: BRISTOL
- Postcode district: BS37
- Dialling code: 01454
- Police: Avon and Somerset
- Fire: Avon
- Ambulance: South Western
- UK Parliament: Thornbury and Yate

Little Sodbury is a village in the civil parish of Horton, in the South Gloucestershire district, in the ceremonial county of Gloucestershire, England. It is located between Chipping Sodbury, to the west, Old Sodbury to the south, Badminton, and the A46 road to the east and Horton and Hawkesbury Upton, to the north. In 2021 the parish had a population of 107. On 1 April 2023 the parish was abolished and merged with Horton.

The "manor of Sodbury" comprises the nearby Chipping Sodbury and Old Sodbury: it is distinct from that of Little Sodbury.

Little Sodbury's Iron Age hill fort reshaped by the Romans is accessible from the village via the Cotswold Way at grid reference ST760826. There is a Royal Observer Corps post at grid reference ST766838. Little Sodbury is one of three Thankful Villages in Gloucestershire – those rare places that suffered no fatalities during the Great War of 1914 to 1918. The village is featured on Darren Hayman's album, Thankful Villages Volume 1.

The 15th century 17,385 square feet (1,615.1 m^{2}) Little Sodbury Manor was the home of Sir John Walsh who employed William Tyndale as chaplain and tutor to his grandchildren in 1522–23; by tradition he began his translation of the Bible in his bedroom here. The manor retains the porch and Great Hall, with a timber roof resting on corbels carved as shield-bearing angels, of the fifteenth-century courtyard house. The house fell into disrepair in the nineteenth century, but was restored by architect Sir Harold Brakspear for Lord Grosvenor and later Baron de Tuyll.

St Adeline's Church was built in 1859 by William James.
