= Huckford Viaduct =

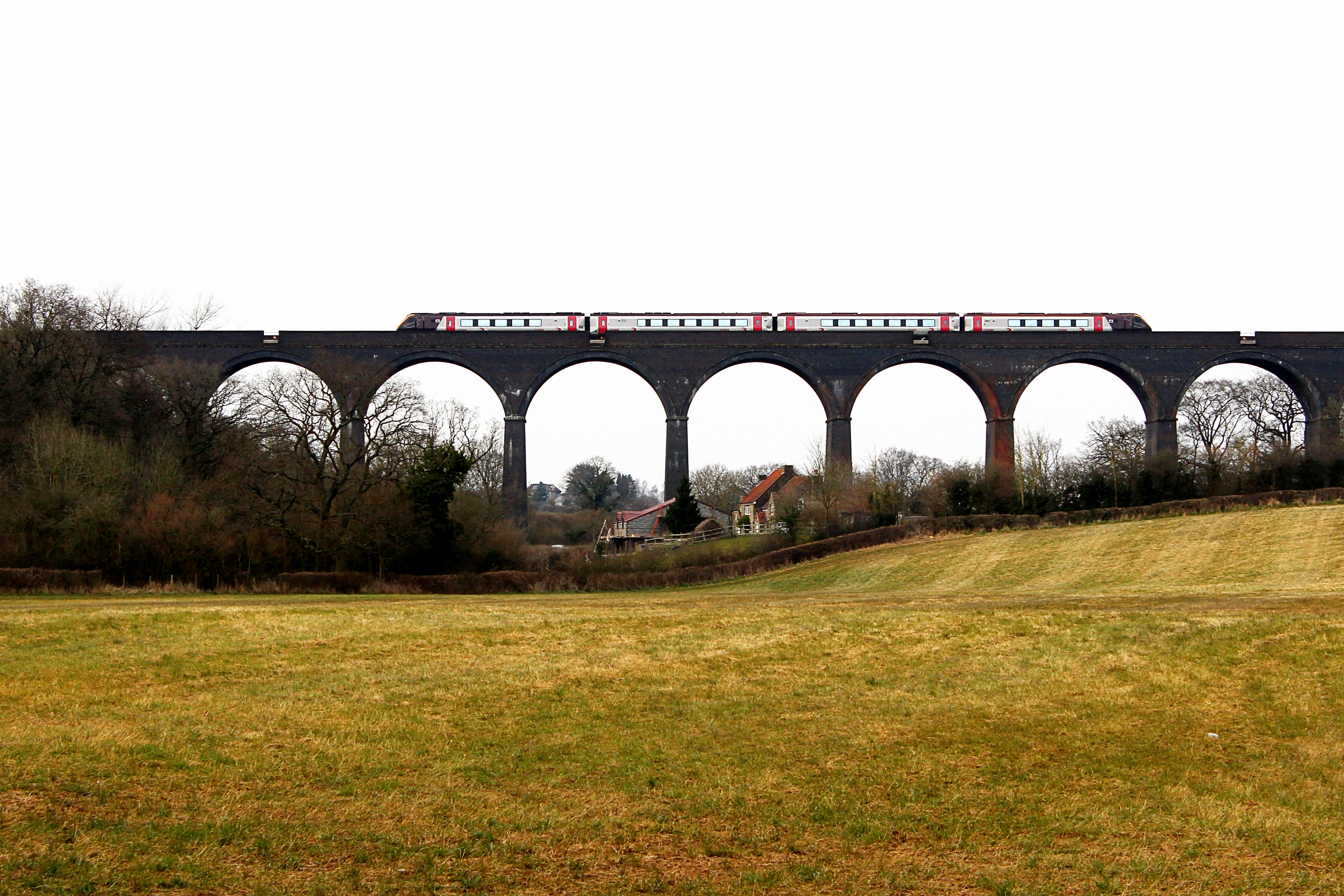
- Huckford Viaduct
- Coordinates: 51.51769°N 2.49615°W
- OS grid reference: NT992532
- Carries: Badminton railway line
- Crosses: River Frome
- Locale: South Gloucestershire
- Other name(s): Winterbourne Viaduct
- Owner: Network Rail
- Maintained by: Network Rail

Characteristics
- Design: Arch bridge
- Material: Brick
- No. of spans: 11

Rail characteristics
- No. of tracks: 2
- Track gauge: 1,435 mm (4 ft 8 1/2 in)

History
- Construction end: 1902
- Opened: 1902

The Huckford Viaduct spans the River Frome just north of Winterbourne Down in South Gloucestershire, England. It presently forms part of the Badminton line from Bristol Parkway to London Paddington.

The viaduct was constructed during 1902 by the Great Western Railway as part of the Wootton Bassett to Patchway railway line. Its construction was driven by the desire to deliver a more direct route for traffic over the somewhat circuitous route that had been previously necessitated. The viaduct has a height of roughly 100 feet above the level of the River Frome, which passes through one of its arches. The Frome Valley Walkway also runs through another of the viaduct's arches.

== History ==
The original route of the Great Western Railway was less than optimal for long-distance traffic between London and South Wales, having involved a relatively circuitous route in the vicinity of Stroud, Gloucester and Chepstow. Following the opening of the Severn Tunnel during 1886, there was both the desire and opportunity to develop a more direct route to South Wales via Bristol. Accordingly, one of the last pieces of the Great Western Railway to be constructed was a 33-mile stretch of track, which has since become known as the Badminton line; the Huckford Viaduct was built so that the line could successfully traverse the Frome valley.

During 1897, work commenced on building the Badminton line. The construction of the line's viaducts was prioritised over several other civil engineering works of the project, as it had been recognised that they would be needed for transporting excavated spoil from several cuttings and embankments being driven around Patchway. To assist the construction effort, a trestle supporting a movable gantry crane was assembled alongside to move payloads between either end of the viaduct. Conventional methods were dominant in the viaduct's construction, which saw concrete bases established along with timber staging to support the brick arches until the structure's completion.

To better facilitate the viaduct's construction, a new brickworks was established at Stoke Gifford, capable of firing 250,000 bricks per week. Furthermore, the majority of the stone of which it is composed was sourced from the adjacent Huckford Quarry. Several decades following the viaduct's completion, this quarry was abandoned; since 1993, it has been designated as a nature reserve located alongside the viaduct.
