= Hambrook =

Village in South Gloucestershire, England

Coordinates: 51.508°N 2.518°W

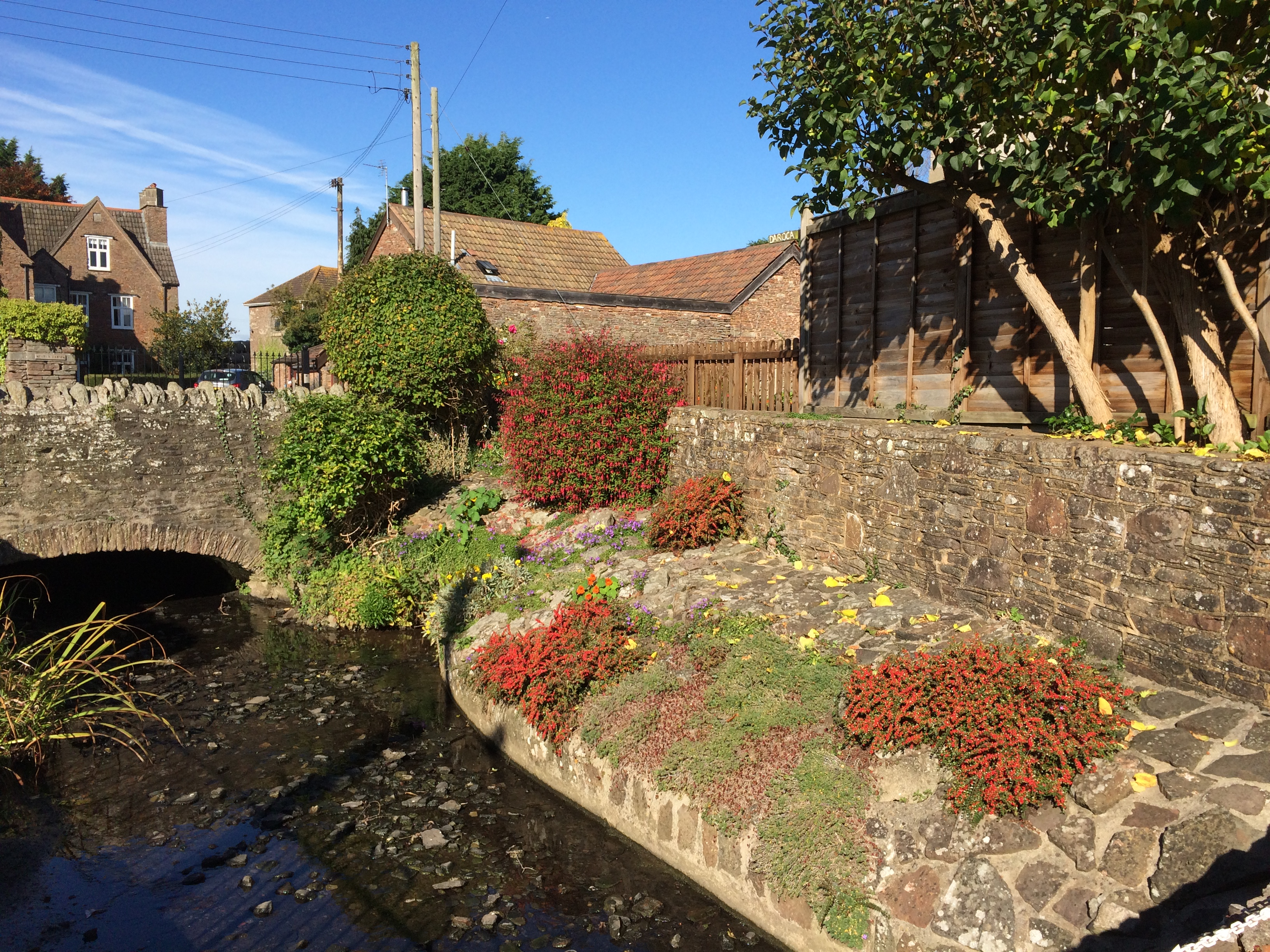

- Location within Gloucestershire
- OS grid reference: ST641780
- Civil parish: Winterbourne
- Unitary authority: South Gloucestershire
- Ceremonial county: Gloucestershire
- Region: South West
- Country: England
- Sovereign state: United Kingdom
- Post town: BRISTOL
- Postcode district: BS
- Dialling code: 0117
- Police: Avon and Somerset
- Fire: Avon
- Ambulance: South Western

Hambrook is a village in the civil parish of Winterbourne, in the South Gloucestershire district, in Gloucestershire, England, situated on the north-eastern outskirts of the city of Bristol. It lies between the larger communities of Winterbourne and Frenchay.

A small settlement was recorded at Hambrook in the Domesday Book.

Today, Hambrook is a commuter village, with the M4 and the Avon Ring Road bisecting it.

Hambrook lies at the south-western foot of Winterbourne Hill. The River Frome and its walkway pass along the village's eastern edge and the Bradley Brook converges with the former in Hambrook. The village is flanked by woodland and fields. Hambrook has a common (or village green) which locals refer to as either 'Hambrook' or 'Whiteshill Common' because of its proximity to the hamlet of Whiteshill. The Common is home to the Civil Parish of Winterbourne's war memorial the village's primary school, with cottages on either side and Hambrook Sports Club, a community amateur sports club which is home to Hambrook Cricket Club and Hambrook Football Club. The primary school is rated “Good” by Ofsted.

Hambrook Court is an 18th-century house. It has been designated as a Grade II listed building.
