= Frampton Cotterell =

Village and parish in Gloucestershire, England

Coordinates: 51.54°N 2.48°W

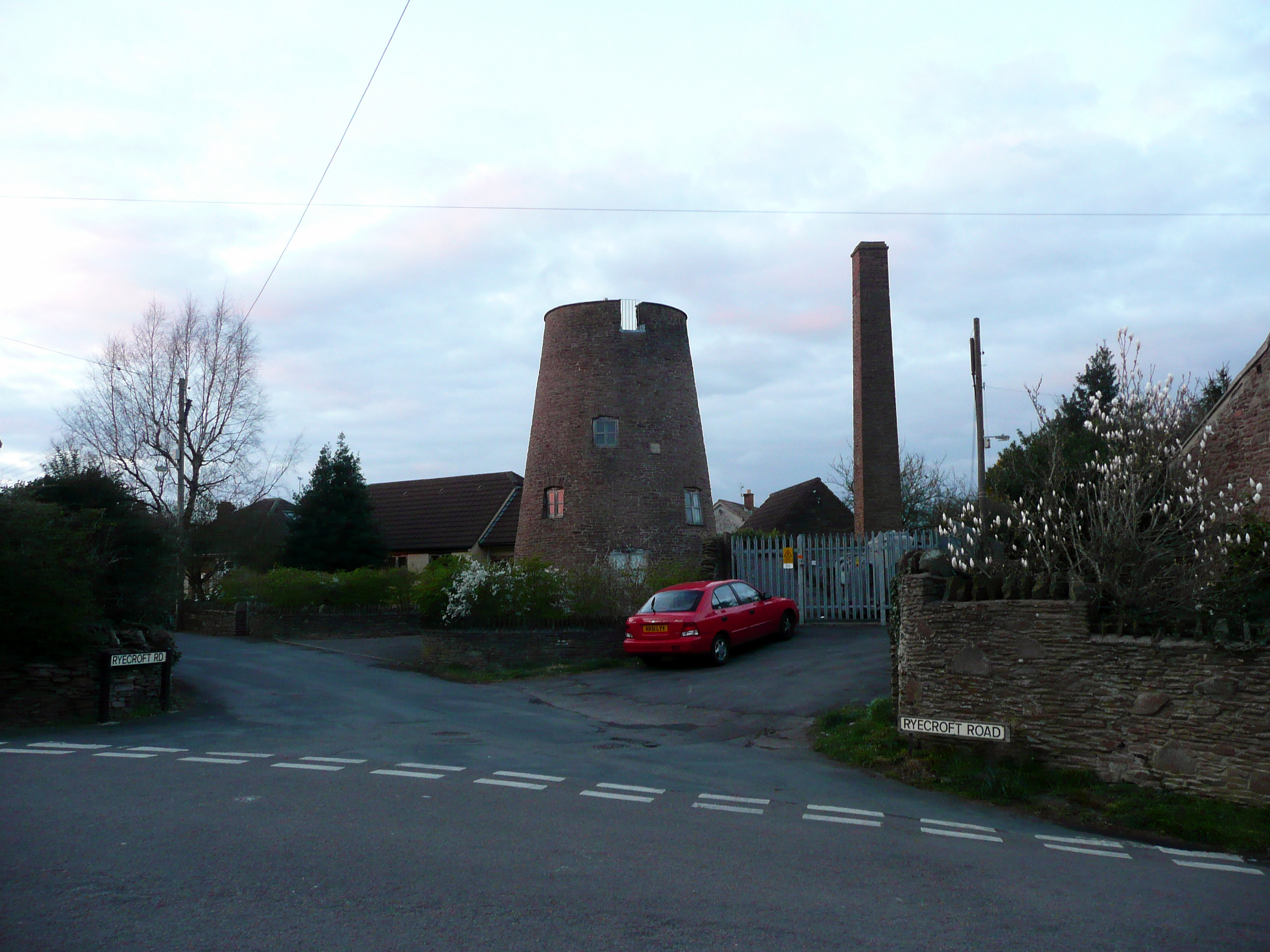
- 'The Windmill' and Windmill Cottage on Ryecroft Road, Brockeridge, 2009. Click image for more information

- Location within Gloucestershire
- Population: 7,162 (2021 Census)
- OS grid reference: ST670818
- Civil parish: Frampton Cotterell
- Unitary authority: South Gloucestershire
- Ceremonial county: Gloucestershire
- Region: South West
- Country: England
- Sovereign state: United Kingdom
- Post town: BRISTOL
- Postcode district: BS36
- Dialling code: 01454
- Police: Avon and Somerset
- Fire: Avon
- Ambulance: South Western
- UK Parliament: Thornbury and Yate

Frampton Cotterell is a village and civil parish in South Gloucestershire, England, on the River Frome. The village is contiguous with Winterbourne to the south-west and Coalpit Heath to the east. The parish borders Iron Acton to the north and Westerleigh to the south-east, the large town of Yate is 2 miles (3.2 kilometres) away. The village is 8 miles (13 kilometres) north-east of Bristol. The population of the village together with the adjoining village of Winterbourne was 14,694 in 2011. The population of the parish alone was 6,520 at the 2011 census.

== History ==
=== Pre Anglo-Saxon history ===
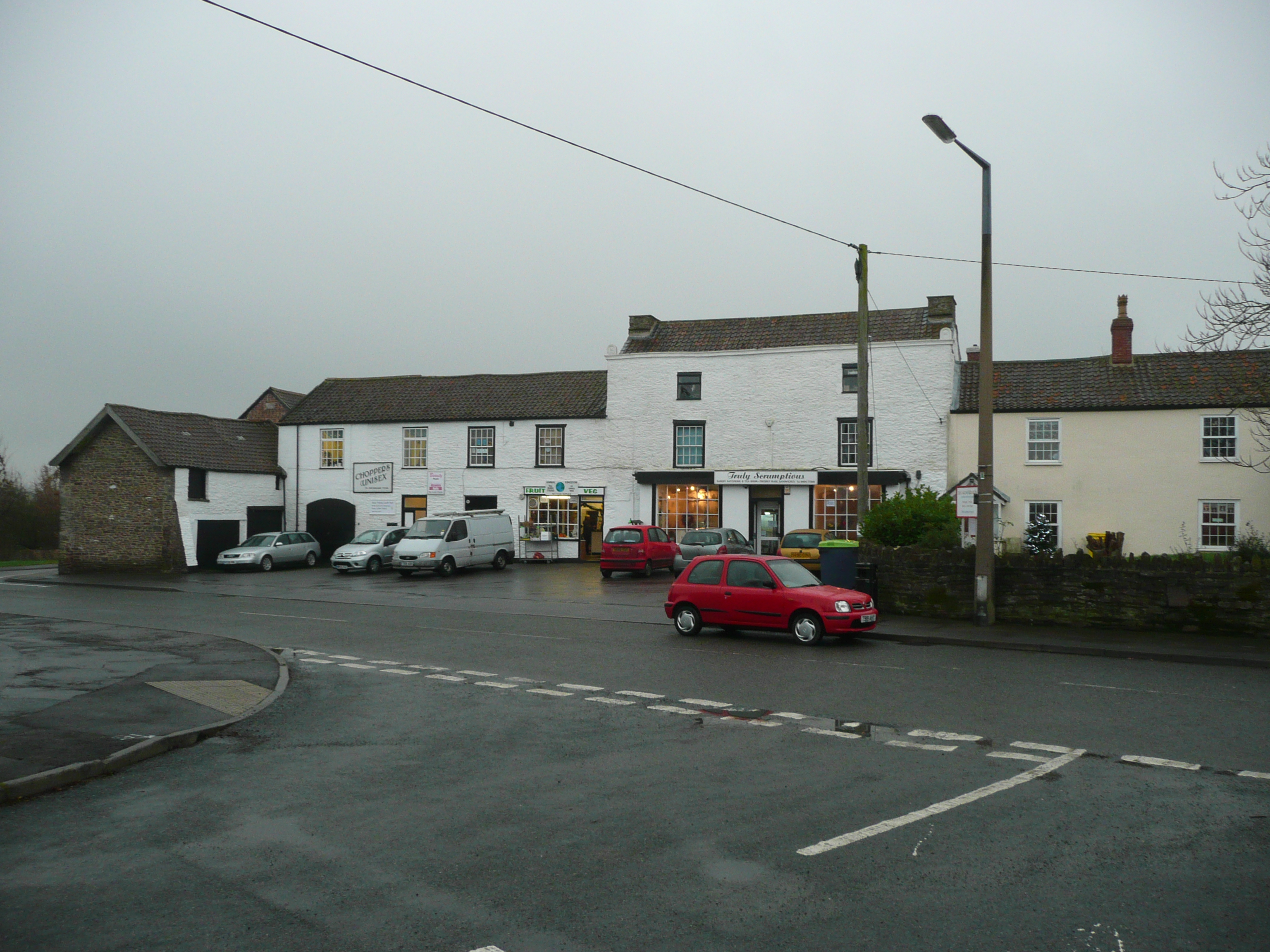
Dullage- The row of shops at the Frampton End Road/Church Road junction, believed to be the site of a Roman settlement in the village

Very little archaeological work has taken place in the Frampton Cotterell area so knowledge of the area prior to the Anglo-Saxon arrival is limited. Local historians tend to use field names and street names to work out the distant history of the village. It is believed from place names that there were two settlements in the area in the Roman times. One centred on the group of shops at the Church Road/Frampton End Road junction, where the name Dullage survived until the 1940s. The second was in rural farmland west of Cogmill in between Frampton Cotterell and Iron Acton, here several fields held the name Chessolds from the old English 'ceastel' meaning 'a heap of stones'.

=== Anglo-Saxon and Medieval history ===
The name Frampton means 'the settlement (farmstead or village) on the Frome'. Frampton Cotterell was recorded as Frantone in the Domesday Book (1086). All the other local villages (Westerleigh, Stoke Gifford and Winterbourne) also have Old English names, suggesting they were either conquered or resettled between 577 and 1066.

Early in the 11th century, Frampton may have been under the manor of Winterbourne, a later medieval record refers to 'the Lordship of Frampton and Winterbourne'. This would have included Stoke Gifford. However, at no point after 1066 were these three manors owned by the same person. The name of a lane in the village, 'Harris Barton' also may be of pre-Norman origin, Barton comes from the Anglo-Saxon 'bere' and 'tun' meaning 'place where grain was stored' this suggests there was a farm here prior to Norman conquest.

In 1086 Frampton was held by Walter the Crossbowman (Balistarius) and then contained 10 villagers and 11 smallholders. Indicating a total population of about 100, to this total should be added slaves and their families. In 1086 there was a church which was not there before 1066 (so under 20 years old) this church was probably on the site of St. Peter's church today. There were also two water mills, probably behind the church (near Mill Lane today) and at Cogmill.

By 1301 Frampton had a third watermill, probably at 'Frampton Lido' upstream from the church (where remains of a mill could be seen as late as the 1970s), a windmill, on the site of the current one at Brockeridge. and a coal pit, presumably at Coalpit Heath (although this name did not appear until around 1680)

By the 13th century the village was known as Frampton Cotell. The name Cotell or Cotterell is derived from the Cotele Family, lords of Frampton Manor in the 12th and early 13th centuries. Their manor house was not at modern day Frampton Court, it was probably located behind the church on the east of Mill Lane, here the field names 'Hall Marsh' and 'Hall Marsh Mead' survived into the 19th Century.

The medieval village was long and rectangular, located on the ridge between (Lower) Stone Close and the River Frome, and between Church Road and Rectory Road. The village was provided for using the open field system. Surrounding the village would have been three big fields; these fields were cultivated by peasants who held scattered strips in the many furlongs which made up the fields, every year one of the fields would be left unploughed and would be fertilised by the manure from the local animals. This system would have provided for the village.

Besides these fields there were also common wastes, Frampton Common, Adam's Land, Brockridge, Goose Green, Woodend Green, and Tovey's Green to name a few.

This system lasted until about 1550 by which time the big fields had made way for compact farms, cultivated by independent farmers as they saw fit. This boosted the village's economy, providing dairy products, cider, pigs, and turnips.

Frampton Cotterell was the residence of Sir John Seymour (1526-1627) brother to Queen Jane Seymour, and his wife Lady Jane Poyntz (1538-1593). Of the subsequent five generations of the Seymour family, the most notable was Lt. Colonel John Seymour, 10th Royal Governor of Maryland, USA.

=== Industrial era ===
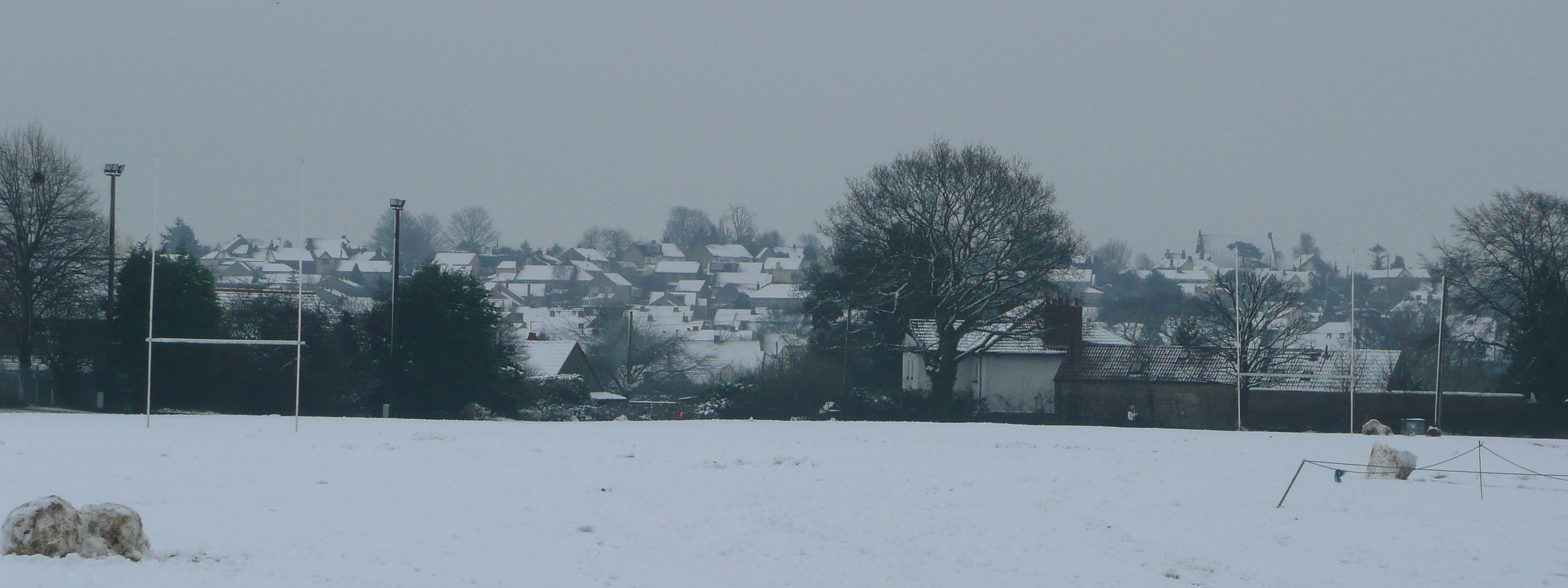
Frampton Cotterell developed on a sloping bank of the River Frome, as seen here from Frampton Common on the other side of the river. St. Peter's Church is off to the left of the picture.

During the 18th and 19th centuries, the hamlets of Brockridge, Adam's Land and others joined together with Frampton Cotterell to form the modern village. Since then the modern village has joined with Winterbourne, Watley's End and Coalpit Heath. One notable Industrial Revolution landmark in the village is the hat factory on Park Lane.

Frampton Cotterell Church of England Primary School was established on School Road in the village in the 19th century. It was moved to its present location on Rectory Road in the 1960s.

=== 20th and 21st centuries ===
Ordnance Survey maps from the middle of the 20th century show open land between the three villages of Frampton Cotterell, Coalpit Heath and Winterbourne. Hamlets at Watley's End, Frampton End and Harris Barton, all of which are now part of Frampton Cotterell and Winterbourne, were still separate at this time.

The most dramatic changes have occurred in the south-east of the village at the boundary with Coalpit Heath, in 1928 Beesmoor Road was constructed through farmland, connecting Badminton Road, the main Yate – Bristol thoroughfare, with the Woodend area of Frampton Cotterell. Since then estates of closes, drives and cul-de-sacs have been built up in the green land between Park Lane and Woodend Road.

In the 1960s Church Road, the main thoroughfare, was rerouted A field in between Rectory Road and Church Road called 'Benson's Field' was sold for housing becoming the 'Benson's Estate'. This estate comprises Beaufort Road, Foxe Road, Winchcombe Road and Brookside Close. Another field north of School Road was built on becoming Robel Avenue and Western Avenue. Houses on Heather Avenue and Beesmoor Road were built. Watermore close and Meadow View were constructed on what was previously Watermore fields, off Lowerstone close. This included the building of formerly, Highcroft junior school rebuilt in the 2010s and a rung of shops on Lowerstone Close that is now the primary shopping area of the village in conjunction with the shops of Church road.

In 1996, an area of farmland to the south of the village was sold in a joint contract with housing estate developers Barratt and Taywood. In the years 1996–2000 they built a large housing estate known as Park Farm, adding an extra 200 3,4 and 5 bedroomed homes to the settlement. There was fierce opposition from local residents, particularly those living on Beesmoor Road. This followed another 20th-century housing development between Woodend Road and Beesmoor Road. In 2011 Barratt Homes began building another large estate on Denny's Field, alongside Park Farm and Heather Avenue, again despite fierce opposition from residents.

== Geography ==
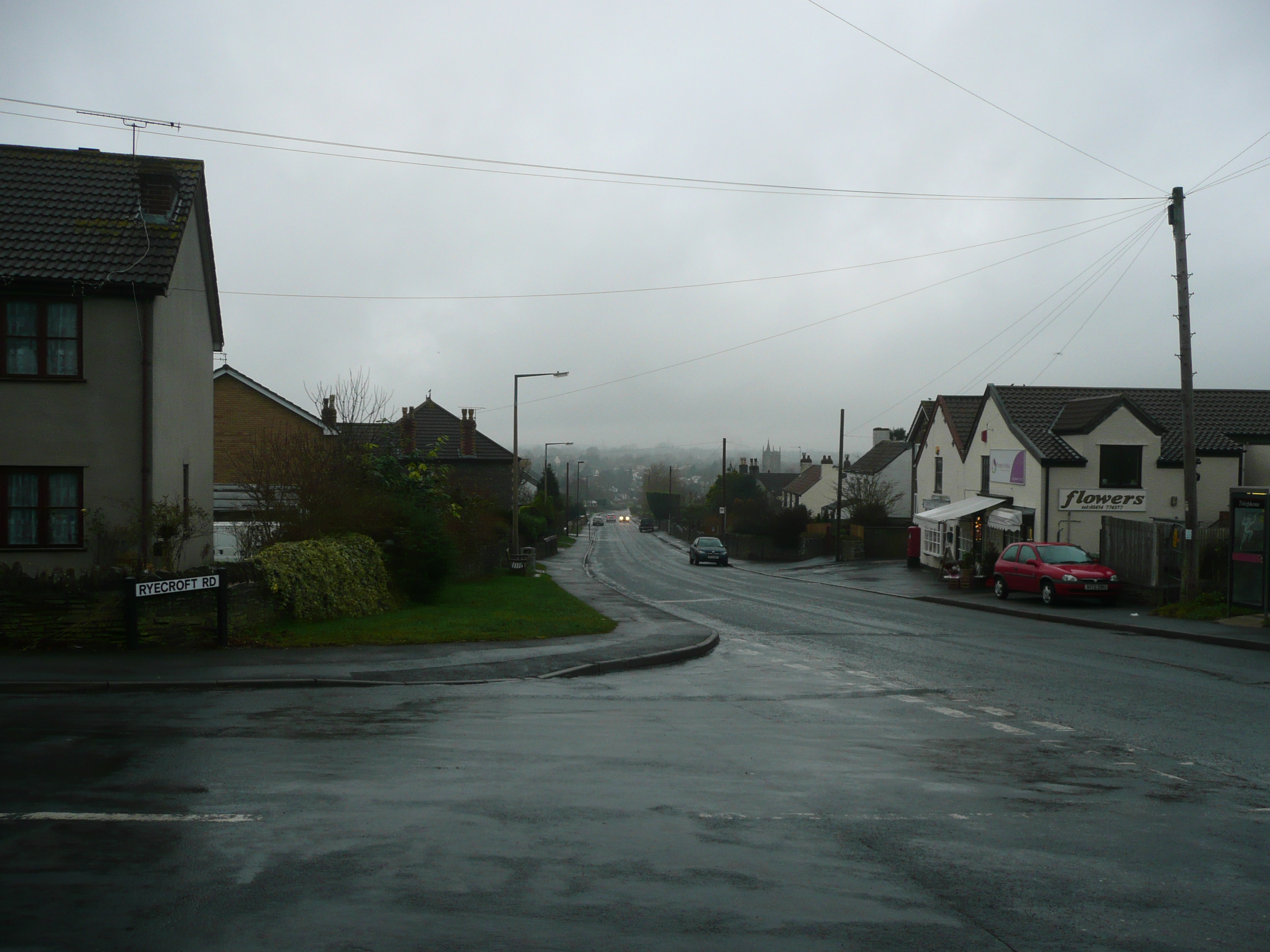
The centre of Frampton Cotterell, looking down Church Road from Ryecroft Road, towards the River Frome, St. Peter's Church is visible. The former post office is on the right.

Frampton Cotterell is seven miles north east of Bristol City centre, and two miles outside the city's ring road, and lies in the commuter belt. It is joined to the villages of Winterbourne and Coalpit Heath, forming a sizeable settlement with a collective population of around 17,500. It is linked by the A432 to Yate and Chipping Sodbury to the north and Downend to the south.

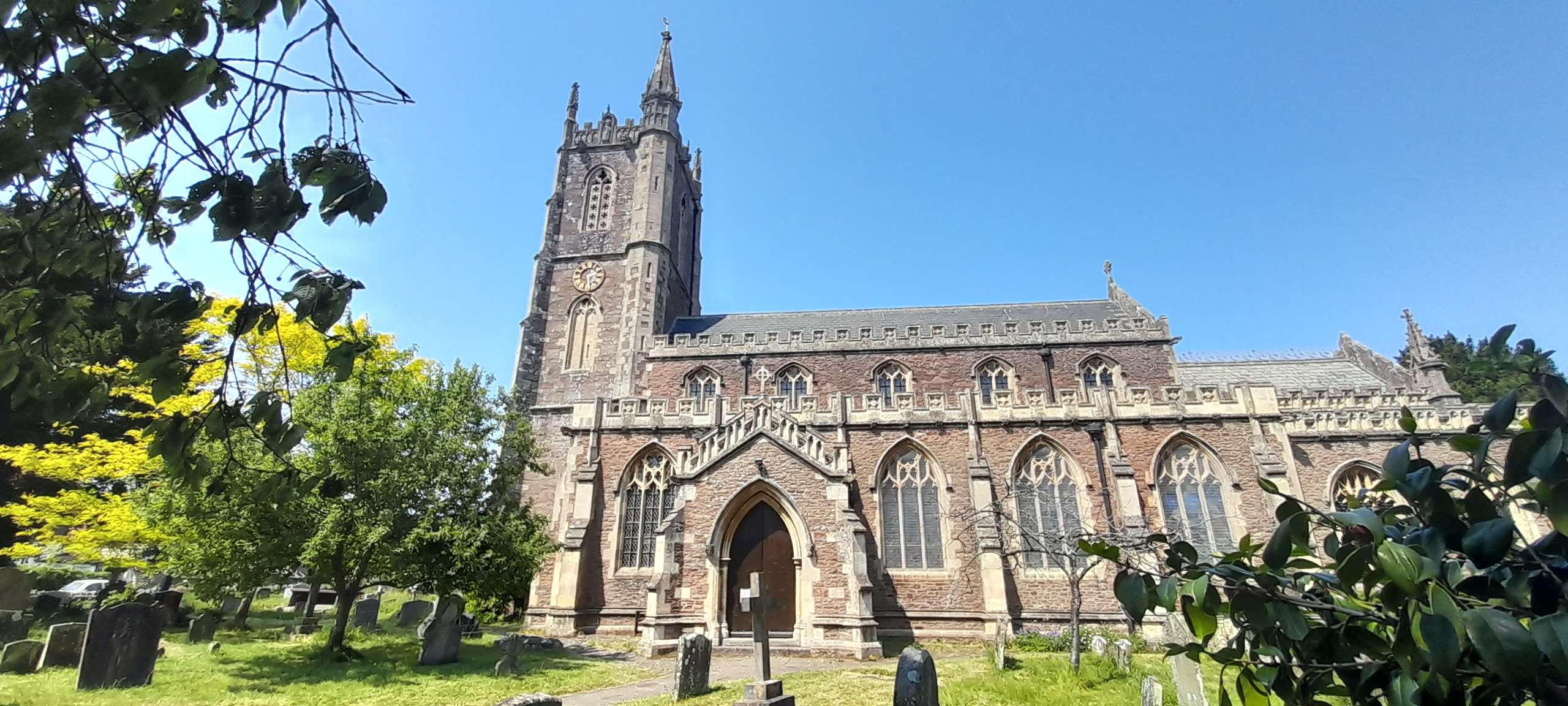
St. Peter's Church, Frampton Cotterell

The A432 is used by residents to travel into nearby Yate and Downend for services.

Frampton Cotterell is twinned with Kelbra, Germany.

== Governance ==
An electoral ward in the same name exists. This ward stretches from Frampton Cotterell in the south to Iron Acton in the north. The total population of this ward taken at the 2011 census was 7,327.

=== Cogmill ===
Cogmill is a historical, and now almost non-existent hamlet in the north of Frampton Cotterell parish in South Gloucestershire. It is located on the B4058 between Frampton Cotterell and Iron Acton, and was possibly the site of a Roman settlement. The name derives from the site of a watermill that was the originally recorded in the 1086 Doomsday census as "Cock Mill" and served as a gristmill for "Cock Mill Farm". The last known recording of this spelling was in the Appointment Roll of 1841 Tithe Map, from then on it has been known as Cogmill.

The watermill remained functioning until the early 19th century and was finally demolished in 1958 by a compulsory purchase order by South Gloucestershire Council to eliminate a sharp corner on the B4058 road. Cogmill Farm still remains but the only evidence of the watermill is the remains of the tail-race tunnel and spill tunnel each side of the current river bridge. An article describing the mill was published by the Bristol Industrial Archaeological Society in 1981 (BIAS Journal, volume 13, page 2)

In 2006 near the site of Cogmill, South Gloucestershire Council selected an area of land for a residential site for Gypsies and Travellers called Frampton Park.
