= Winterbourne Down, Gloucestershire =

Coordinates: 51.515°N 2.503°W

Winterbourne Down
- Village
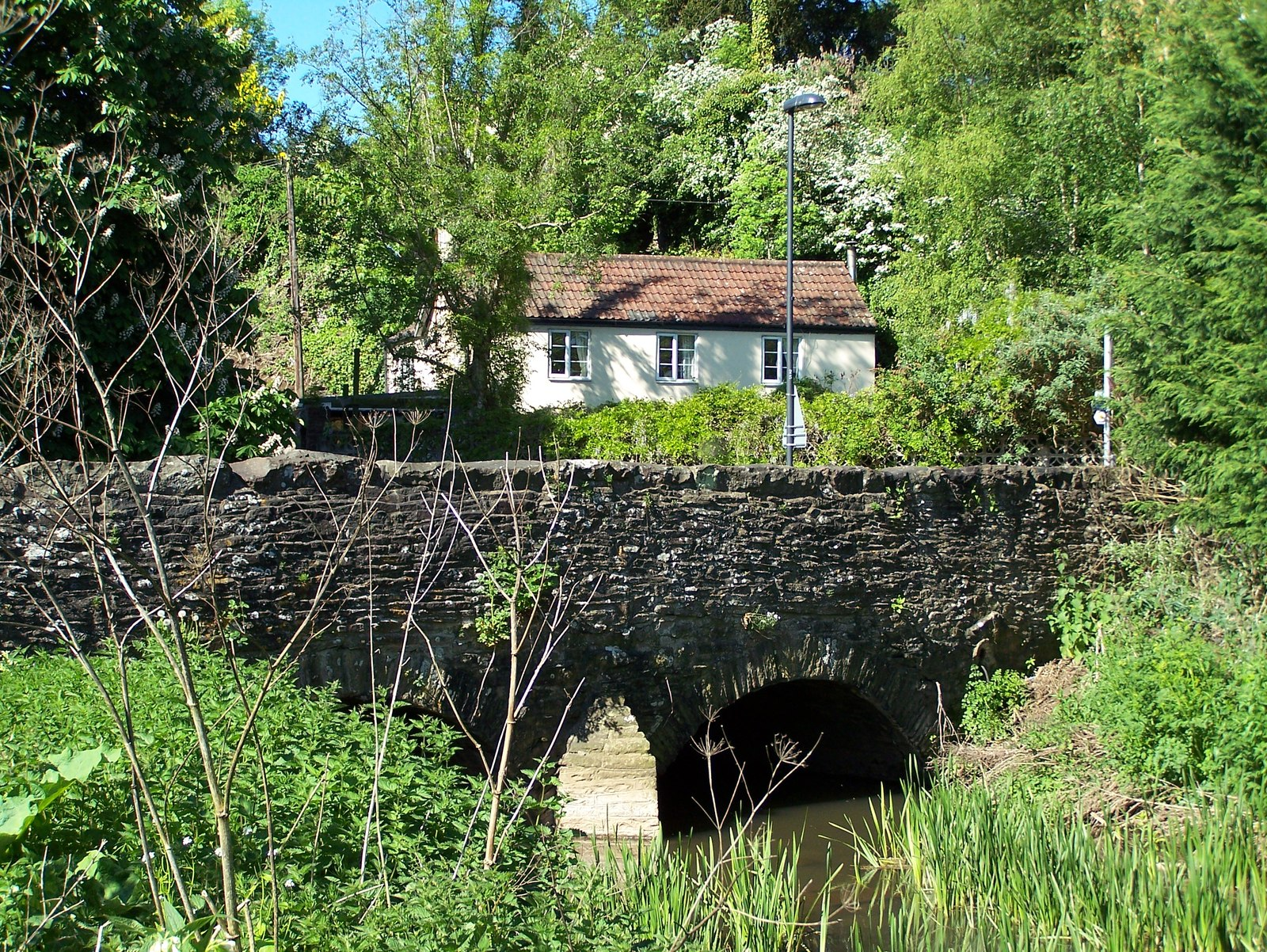
- Damsons Bridge, Winterbourne Down

- Location within Gloucestershire
- Civil parish: Winterbourne
- Unitary authority: South Gloucestershire
- Ceremonial county: Gloucestershire
- Region: South West
- Country: England
- Sovereign state: United Kingdom
- Post town: Bristol
- Postcode district: BS36
- Police: Avon and Somerset
- Fire: Avon
- Ambulance: South Western
- UK Parliament: Filton and Bradley Stoke

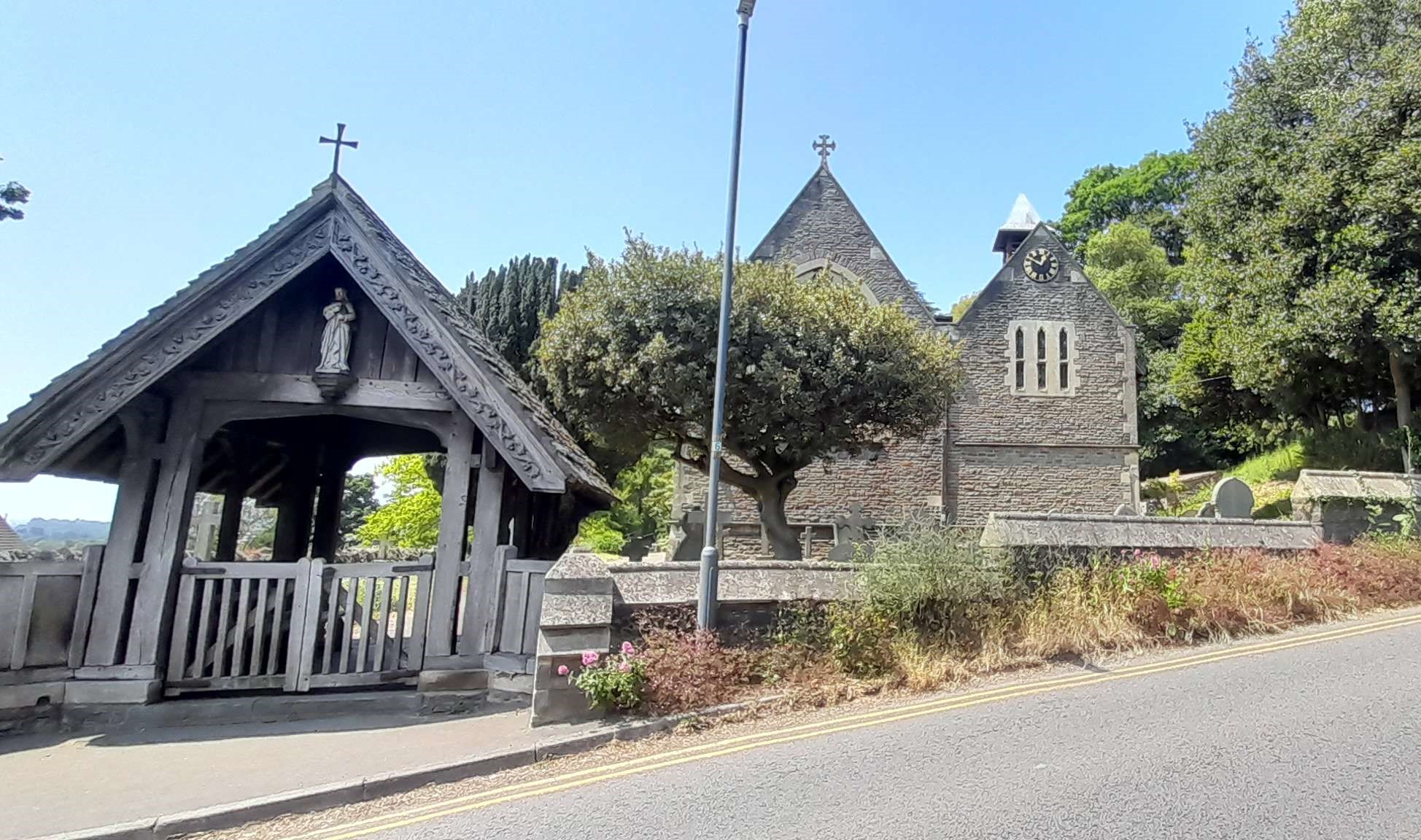
Church of All Saints, Winterbourne Down

Winterbourne Down is a village in South Gloucestershire, England. It is part of the civil parish of Winterbourne. Situated 7 miles (11 km) north-east of Bristol city centre, it is separated from the main Bristol Built-up Area by the Avon Green Belt. The parish's annual May Day carnival is held here.

The Frome Valley Walkway passes through the village and provides views of the Huckford Viaduct. The village contains the Anglican All Saints Church and the Methodist Bethesda chapel. Winterbourne Down is also noted for its extensive wooded areas, quarrying legacy and the remains of a Roman camp.
