= Warbelton v Gorges =

1347 heraldic law case in England

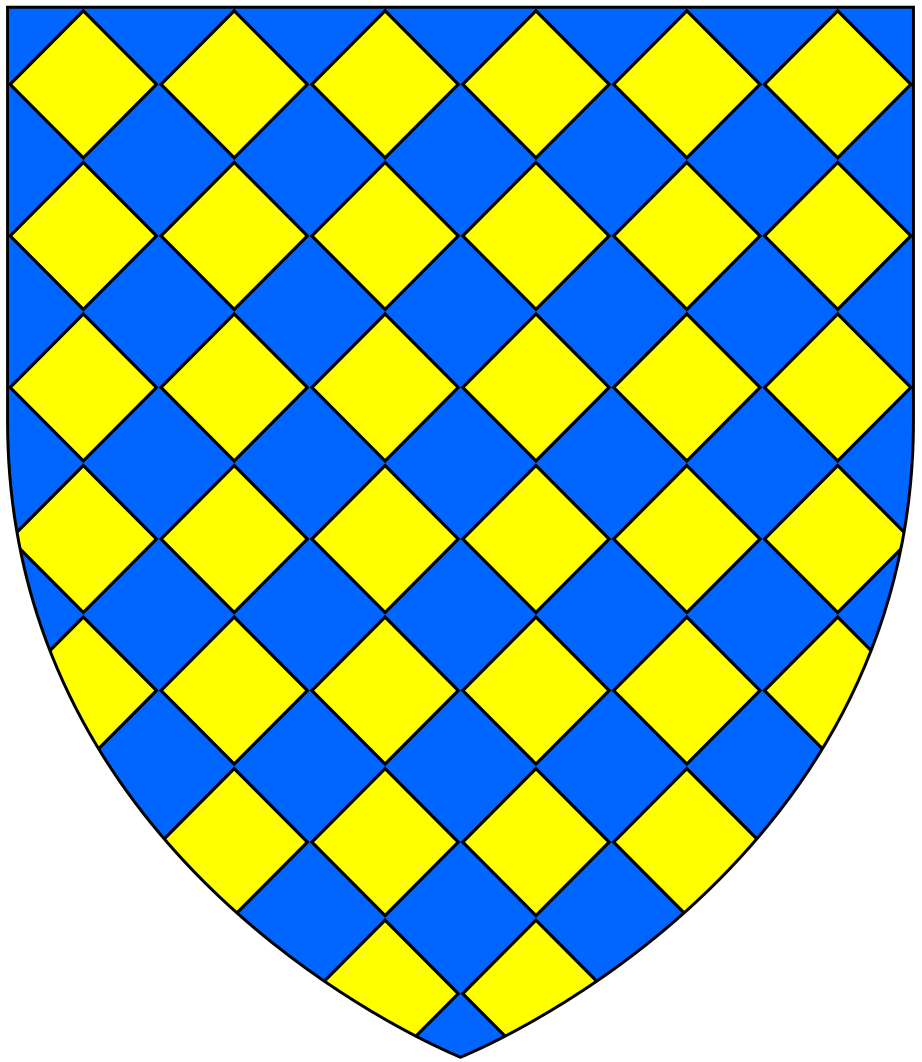
- Lozengy or and azure, the arms subject of the 1347 dispute between Warbelton & Gorges. As depicted on the Dering Roll (1270/80) for Thomas de Warbotone
- Court: Court of Honour
- Full case name: John de Warbelton v Theobald de Gorges
- Decided: 1347

Holding
- (1) The same undifferenced arms could not be held by two English armigers at the same time. (2) Warbelton demonstrated a superior claim to the arms Lozengy Or and azure, and Gorges must either difference the arms or choose new ones.

Court membership
- Judges sitting: Lord Lancaster, Lord Huntingdon, Lord Cobham, Lord Manny, Lord Morley, Steven de Cosinton

Case opinions
- Decision by: Per curiam

Warbelton v. Gorges (Note: Spoken as "Warbelton and Gorges." The v in the case title is an abbreviation of the Latin in versus, but is normally pronounced "and" for civil cases in England and Wales.) was one of the earliest heraldic law cases brought concerning English armory, in 1347. It concerned the coat of arms blazoned Lozengy Or and azure; that, is, a checkerboard pattern of blue and gold, rotated by 45°. The arms were borne by the unrelated families of Warbelton, from Hampshire, and Gorges, from Somerset, apparently without knowledge of each other or their common usage, until John de Warbelton and Theobald de Gorges served together in the English army at the Siege of Calais in 1346/7. A gentleman's armorial bearings represented his very identity and were of enormous importance to him, both as a matter of family pride and for practical purposes of personal recognition in battle and in legal seals. Warbelton made a formal complaint to the officer appointed by the king to resolve such matters, namely Henry of Grosmont, Earl of Lancaster, seneschal of England, who was commanding the English forces. A 6-man court of honour was convened and the pair were cross-examined, with evidence being sought from knights of their own localities also serving at the siege.

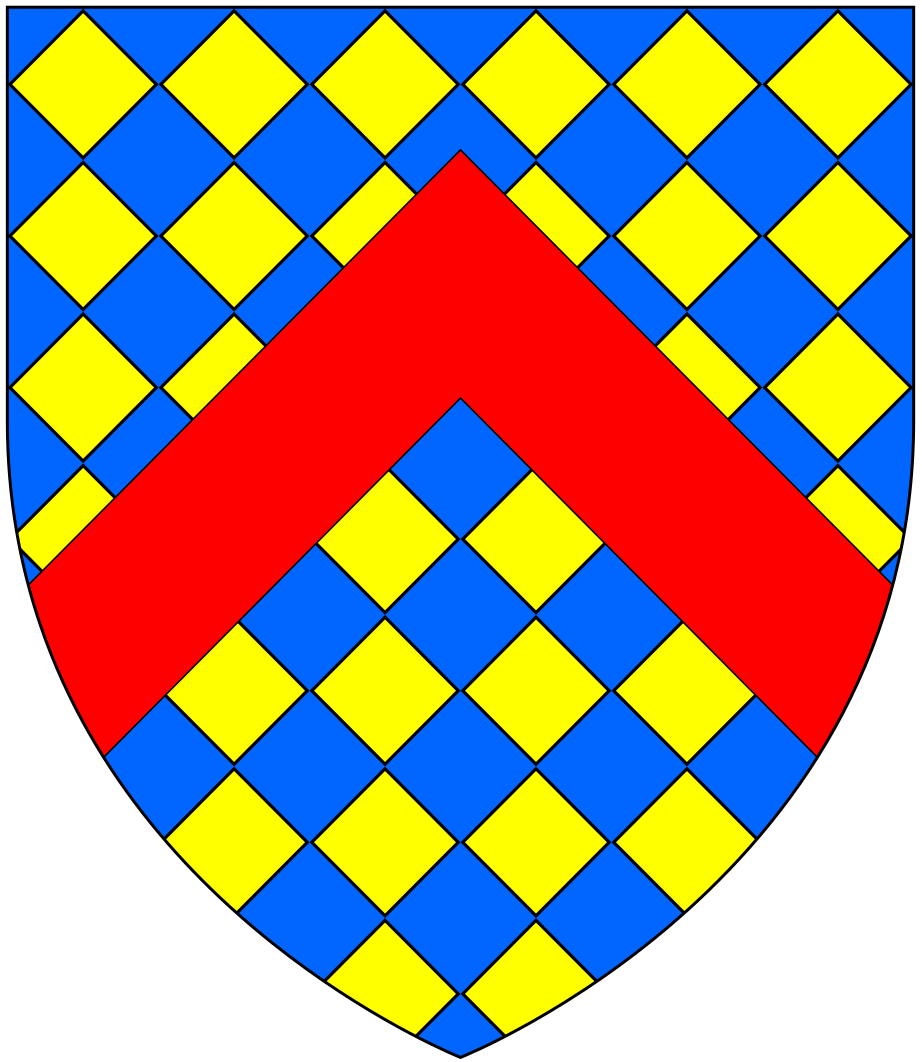
New arms of Theobald Russell "de Gorges" adopted following the judgement of 1347, known as "Gorges Modern": Lozengy or and azure, a chevron gules

The case was won by Warbelton, who proved a better title to the arms, and Gorges, in order not to contravene the judgement, retained the arms with the addition of a chevron gules (red chevron) for difference. The charter drawn up in 1347 to record the judgement is preserved in the College of Arms, from which an accurate drawing was made when it was in the possession of Peter Le Neve during his tenure as Norroy King of Arms (1704–1729), which facsimile forms folio 144 of Ashmole manuscript 1137 preserved in the Bodleian Library, Oxford. At the time of the drawing it still had appended to it 5 of the original 6 seals, which provide valuable heraldic information. The timing of the case is of importance, coming just one year before the very height of the "Age of Chivalry", symbolised by the founding by King Edward III of the Order of the Garter (1348), accompanied by a lavish tournament (which was heraldry's greatest showcase) at Windsor Castle.

== Charter ==
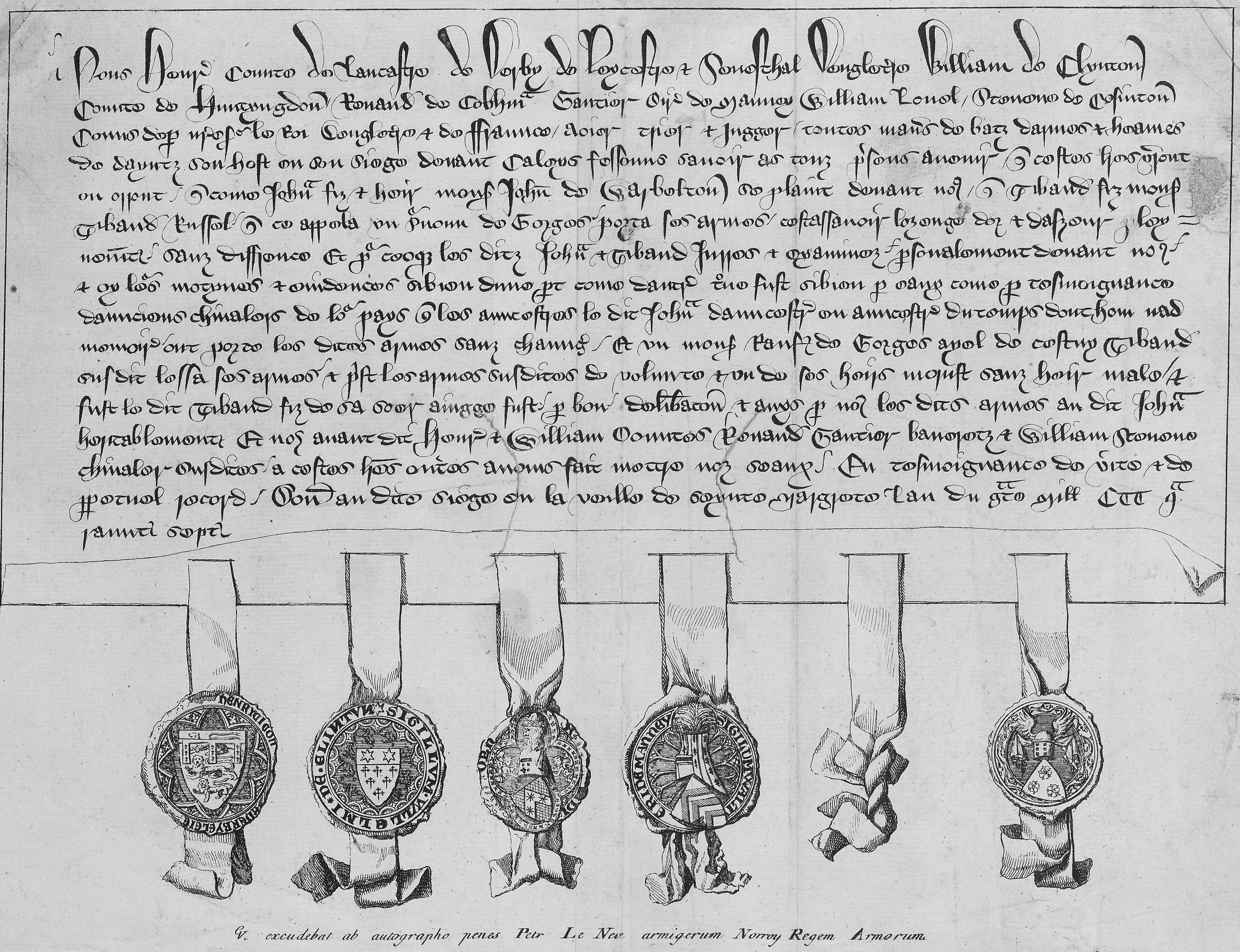
Award dated 19 July 1347 of a court of honour convened before Calais in the matter of Warbelton v. Gorges. MS Ashmole 1137, f.144, Bodleian Library

A transcript of the original mediaeval French charter follows:

Nous Henri counte de Lancastre de Derby de Leycestre et seneschal d'engletere William de Clynton counte de Huntyngdon Renaud de Cobham Gautier sire de Manney William Lovel Stevene de Cosinton comis de monseigneur le roi d'engletere et de ffraunce aoier trier et jugger toutes maniers de batz d'armes et heames de dayntz son host en son siege devant Caleys fessouns savoir as touz presens avenir cestes.....ou ….... come Johan fiz et heir monseigneur Johan de Warbelton se plaint devant nous / Tibaud fiz monseigneur Tibaud Russel se appela …... nom de Gorges porta ses armes cestassavoir lozenge d'or et d'aszeur ... sanz diffrence et ... les ditz Johan et Tibaud jurres et examinez personalement devant nous et … … … et evidences … … … come d'autre … fust... par sang come par tesmoignance d'aunciens chivalers de leurs pays / les auncestres le dit Johan d'auncestre en auncestre du temps... ...memoire ont porte les dites armes sanz chaunge / Et vu monsiegneur Rauf de Gorges ayel de cestuy Tibaud susdit lessa ses armes et (prist?) les armes susdites de volunte et vu de ses heirs morust sanz heir male / et fust le dit Tibaut fiz de sa soer augge fust par bon delib(er)acon et avis par nous les dits armes au dit Johan heritablement Et nous avant dit Henri et William countes Renaud Gautier baneretz et William Stevene chivaler susdites a cestes (lettres ouvertes?) avons fait mettre nos seaux en tesmoignance de vite et de perpetuel record Done au dite siege en la veille de seynte Margrete l'an du grace mill CCC qaraunte sept.

Translation:

We Henry, Earl of Lancaster, Derby and Leicester, seneschal of England; William de Clinton, Earl of Huntingdon; Reginald de Cobham; Walter Lord de Manny; William Lovel; Steven de Cosinton; commissioned by the lord king of England and of France to hear, try and judge all manner of disputes of arms and helms (i.e.crests?) within his host in the siege before Calais, make known to all present and future this (decree). Whereas John son & heir of Sir John de Warbelton makes plaint before us; Theobald son of Sir Theobald Russell calls himself by name of de Gorges carries his arms, that is to say lozengy or and azure … without difference and … the said John & Theobald have been sworn and examined personally before ourselves … and evidence … (taken) … by blood as well as by witness of ancient knights of their counties; the ancestors of the said John from ancestor to ancestor from time (immemorial) have borne the said arms without change; and Sir Ralph de Gorges uncle of the present Theobald herestated relinquished his arms and took up the said arms voluntarily and his heirs died without male heir; and the said Theobald was the son of his sister. It has been adjudged by good deliberation and counsel by us that the said arms (belong to) the said John hereditably. And we the foresaid Henry and William, earls; Reginald, Walter, bannerets; and William, Steven, knights; above stated, to these (letters patent?) have caused to be placed our seals in witness as present and perpetual record. Given at the said siege on the eve of St Margaret (i.e. 19th July) the year of grace one thousand three hundred and forty-seven.

== Members of court of honour ==
The members of the court of honour convened to resolve the dispute are as follows, with the blazon of the arms shown on the appended seals given for each, left to right:

- Henry of Grosmont, Earl of Lancaster: England with a label of France of 3 points, that is in full: Gules, 3 lions passant guardant or charged with a label of 3 points azure each charged with 3 fleurs de lys or (see Armorial of the House of Plantagenet)
- William de Clinton, 1st Earl of Huntingdon: Argent, 6 crosslets fitchees sable on a chief azure 2 mullets or (per Calais roll of arms, quoted by Boutell, Charles, Heraldry Historical and Popular, London, 1863, p. 171/2)
- Reginald de Cobham, 1st Baron Cobham: Gules, on a chevron or 3 estoiles sable (Calais Roll, quoted by Boutell op.cit., p. 167)
- Walter de Manny, 1st Baron Manny: Or, 3 chevronels sable (quoted by Boutell, p. 137)
- William Lovel, 7th Baron Morley jure uxoris: seal missing.
- Steven de Cosinton: 3 roses.

== Background ==
Original canting arms of Gorges: Argent, a gurges (whirlpool) azure. These arms were used continuously by the senior line of Gorges of Tamerton Foliot, Devon, but were dropped by Ralph IV, 2nd Baron Gorges, in favour of the arms of his distant ancestor de Morville, Lozengy, or and azure. He is recorded as having borne the latter at the Siege of Caerlaverock in 1300

As the charter records, the Warbelton family had borne the arms Lozengy or and azure from time immemorial, that is to say probably from about 1215 when the use of heraldic devices became widespread in England. At the same time the arms had also been adopted by the de Morville family of Knighton, Isle of Wight; Bradpole, Dorset; and Wraxall, Somerset. A cadet branch of the Gorges family had married the heiress of the last de Morville early in the 13th century, that is to say very shortly after the Morvilles had adopted these arms. Yet the Gorgeses had by then chosen their own canting arms of a whirlpool (Latin gurges) depicted by a blue whorl on a white field, blazoned Argent, a gurges azure. The senior branch of Gorges settled at Tamerton Foliot in Devon, whilst the cadet line, which had married the de Morville heiress, became seated in the former Morville manors in Somerset, Dorset and the Isle of Wight. It was perhaps to difference themselves from the Tamerton Foliot line that they relinquished the paternal arms of the gurges and take up the former Morville "lozengy" arms. Certainly this change had been made by Ralph III, 1st Baron Gorges (d.1324), before 1300 as the Caerlaverock roll of arms records, composed by heralds at the Siege of Caerlaverock, in which the alternative term "masculy" is used for "lozengy":

Ilucques vi-je Rauf de Gorges
Chevalier nouvel adoube
De peres a tere tumbe
E defoule plus de une foiz
Car tant estoit de grant bufoiz
Ke il ne s'en deignoit departir
Tout son harnois e son atire
Avoit masole de or e de asur

Rendered into English thus by Rev. Frederick Brown, FSA, from whose notes Raymond Gorges produced his "History of the Family of Gorges", 1944, op.cit.:

Sir Ralph de Gorges there I saw
One newly bound to knighthood's law
Down to the earth was prostrate thrown
More than once struck by some great stone
Or staggered by the rushing crowd
Still to recede he was too proud
Upon his arms and surcoat fold
Was masculy of blue and gold

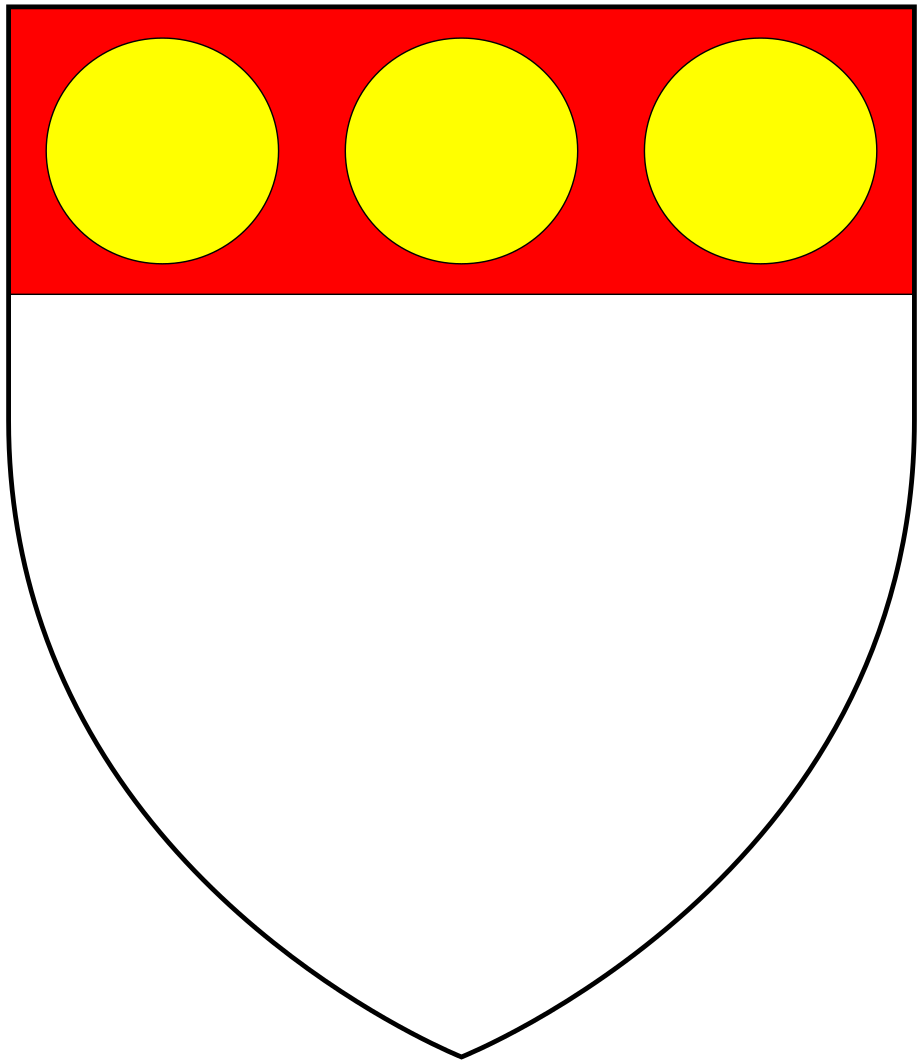
Arms of Russell of Kingston Russell, Dorset: Argent, on a chief gules 3 bezants, the paternal arms relinquished by Theobald Russell "de Gorges" following his inheritance of the Gorges lands from his uncle

The Calais charter of 1347 confirms that the Gorges family had made such change voluntarily. Yet the matter is made more complex by the fact that the cadet branch of the Gorges family had died out in the male line on the death of Ralph IV, 2nd Baron Gorges, without issue in 1331. The latter, seemingly in an effort to preserve his family name and arms, had made one of his younger nephews his heir, apparently on condition that he should adopt the name and arms of Gorges. This nephew was William Russell, the second son of his second sister Eleanor de Gorges who had married Sir Theobald Russell (d.1341) of Yaverland, Isle of Wight, and of Kingston Russell, Dorset. Yet on William's early death in 1342 the Gorges inheritance passed to his younger brother Theobald Russell "de Gorges", the defendant in the Calais court of honour. Theobald, who died in 1381, went on to found a notable line, seated at Wraxall, Somerset, which carried on the Gorges name and "modern arms" for several centuries, a member of which was Sir Ferdinando Gorges, founder of the American province of Maine.

== Sequel ==
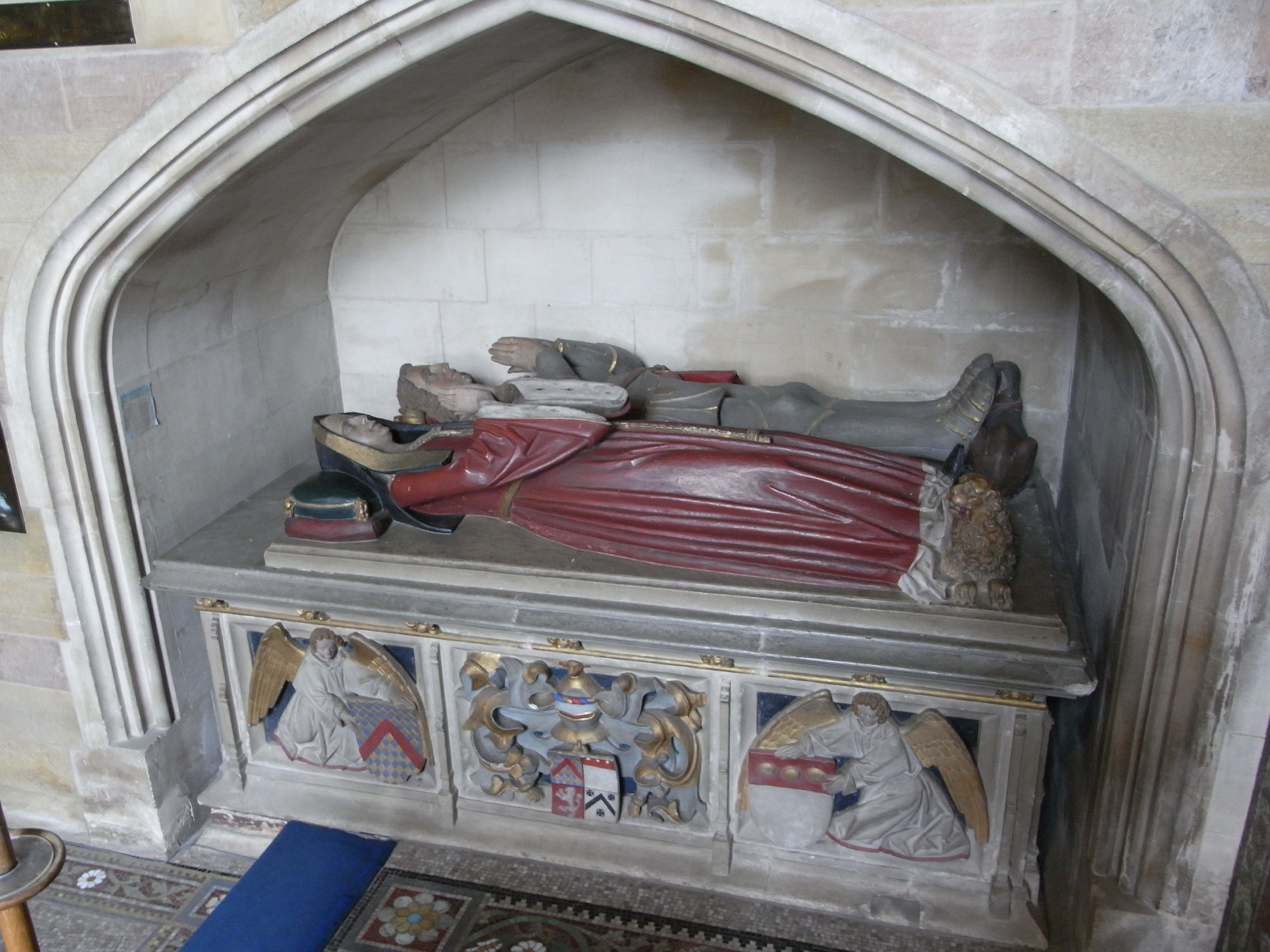
Tomb at Wraxall, of Sir Edmund Gorges (d.1512), showing on base in dexter "Gorges Modern", in sinister arms of Russell. A drawing of this tomb was made by Samuel Hieronymus Grimm.

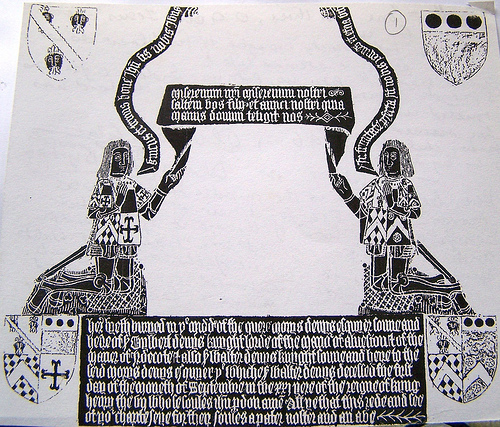
Denys monumental brass at Olveston, Glos., 1505. "Gorges Modern" is shown in the 3rd quarter of both the lower shields and on the fronts and sleeves of both tabards. The shield in the upper sinister position shows the Russell arms, the Denys arms being in the upper dexter position

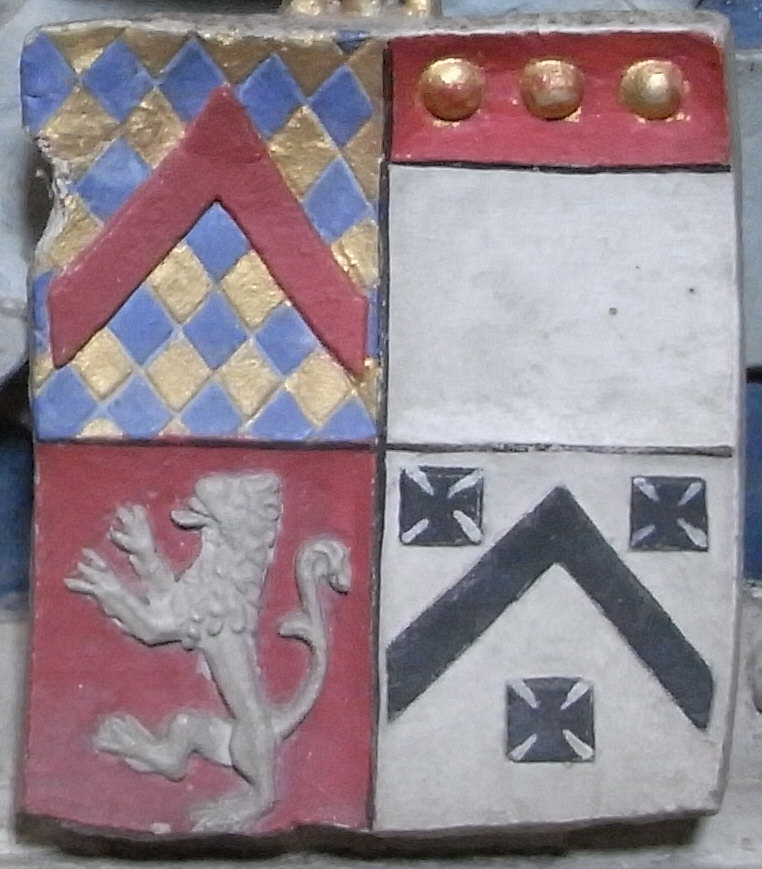
Gorges quartered escutcheon, 1512, Wraxall (detail)

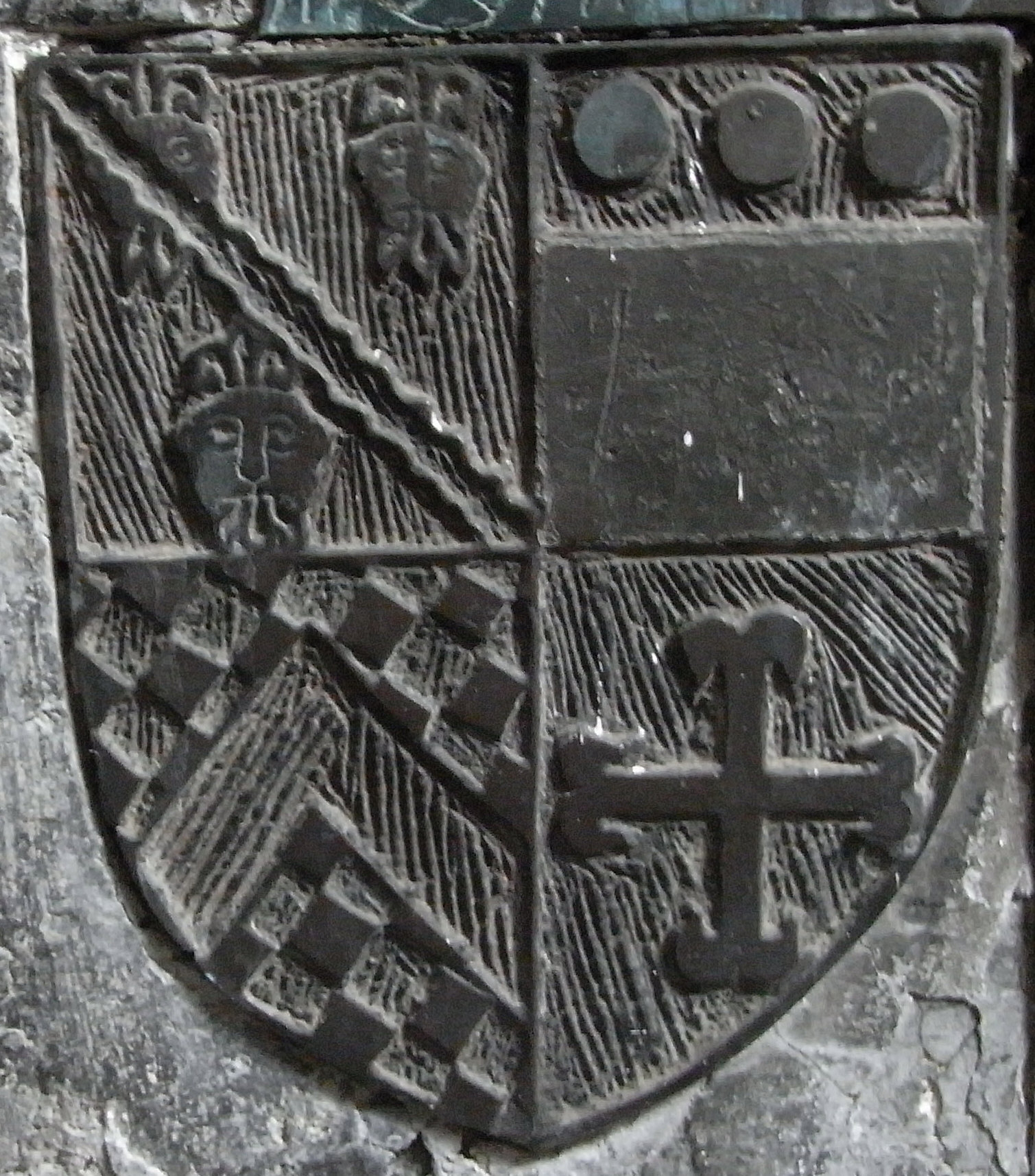
Denys quartered escutcheon, 1505, Olveston (detail)

Theobald lost no time in having a chevron cut into his existing seal-die, as the existence of a charter dated 1347 bearing his new arms proves, now held in the British Museum. The arms of "Gorges Modern" are displayed in the dexter position on the tomb at Wraxall, of Sir Edmund Gorges (d.1512), K.B. (great-great-grandson of Theobald Russell "de Gorges") and his wife Ann Howard, daughter of John Howard, 1st Duke of Norfolk (d.1485). Also shown on the tomb in the sinister position are the arms of Russell: Argent, on a chief gules 3 bezants. The arms of "Gorges Modern" are also quartered in the Denys monumental brass at Olveston, Gloucestershire, commemorating Sir Walter Denys (d.1505), great-grandson of Sir Maurice Russell (d.1416) of Dyrham, Gloucestershire. The judgement of 1347 appears to have been applied retrospectively in this instance as Sir Maurice Russell was the son of Ralph Russell of Yaverland, Isle of Wight, the elder brother of Theobald Russell "de Gorges". Thus, the closest male Gorges ancestor of the Denys family was Ralph de Gorges III, 1st Baron Gorges (d.1324), grandfather of Theobald Russell "de Gorges". This seems to suggest that Sir Maurice Russell himself quartered "Gorges Modern", as the Denys family would no doubt have followed his precedent in their heraldic usage, and would have had many heraldically embellished heirlooms of his from which to make their escutcheons.

== Other famous cases ==
Other famous mediaeval heraldic disputes which came before the jurisdiction of the Earl Marshall are as follows:

- Poyntz v. FitzAlan, dispute mentioned in Roll of Caerlaverock (pre-1300)
- Harding v. St. Loo (1312)
- Sytsylt v. Fakenham (1333)
- Hugh Maltby v. Hamon Beckwith (1339)
- Scrope v Grosvenor (1385), the most famous, costly & lengthy case.

== See also ==
- High Court of Chivalry

== Sources ==
- Gorges, Raymond & Brown, Frederick, Rev., FSA. The Story of a Family through Eleven Centuries, Illustrated by Portraits and Pedigrees: Being a History of the Family of Gorges. Boston, USA (Merrymount Press privately published), 1944.
- Boutell, Charles. Heraldry Historical and Popular, London, 1863.
