= Edmund Cheyne =

Member of the Parliament of England

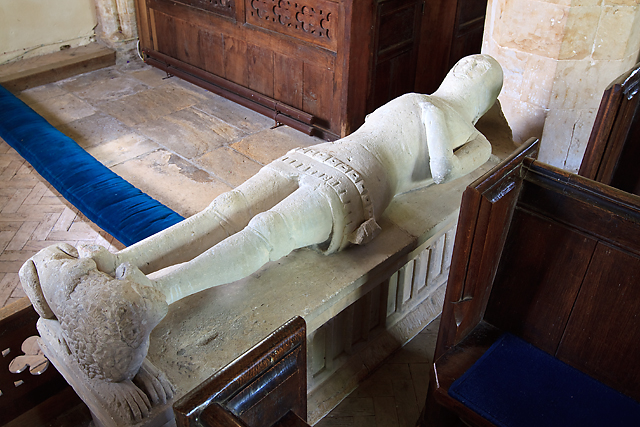
Late 14th century effigy of a knight in All Saints Church, Poyntington, possibly of Edmund Cheney (died 1374/83)

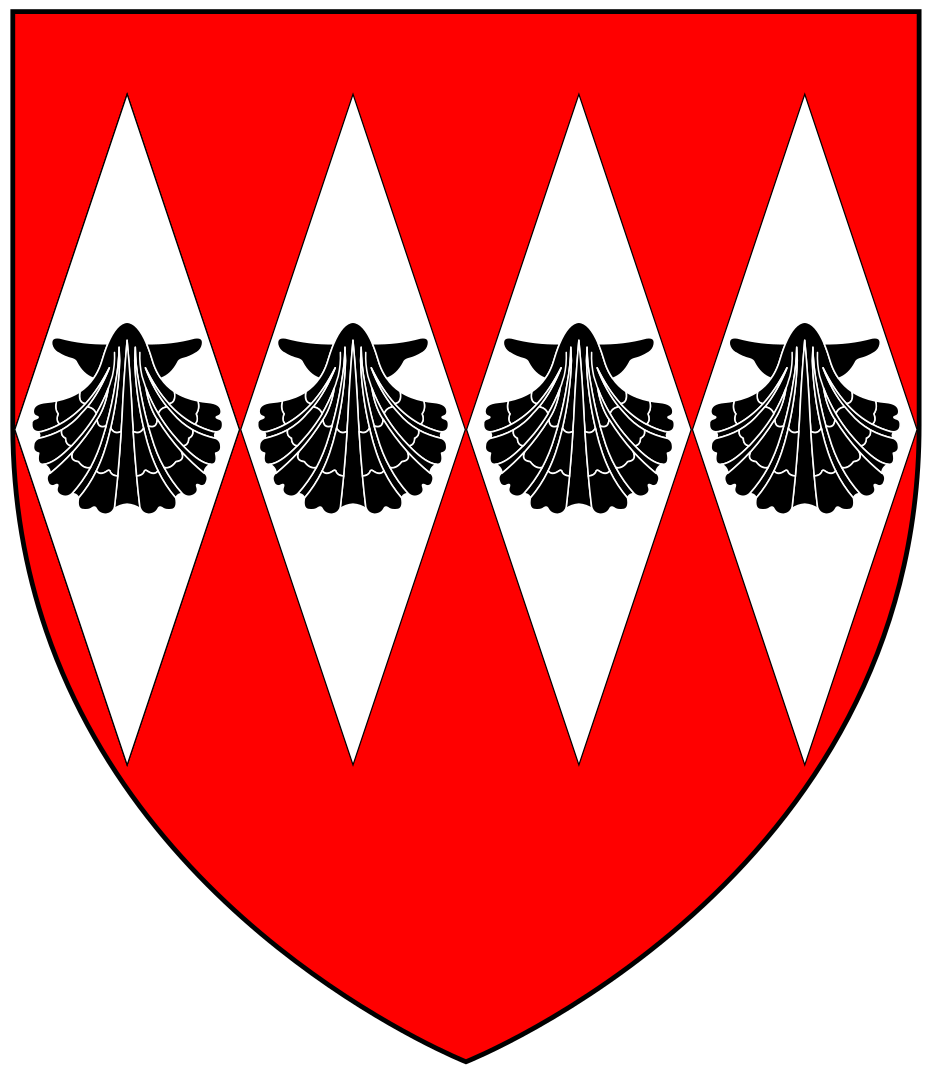
Arms of Cheyne/Cheney: Gules, four fusils in fess argent on each an escallop sable

Sir Edmund Cheyne (d.1374/83) of Poyntington in Somerset, was a Member of Parliament and served as Warden of the Channel Islands 1358–1367.

== Origins ==
He was the eldest son and heir (by his first wife) of Sir William Cheyne (d.1345) of Poyntington. His younger half-brother (by his father's second wife Joan Gorges, a daughter of Ralph Gorges of Bradpole in Dorset) was Sir Ralph Cheyne (c. 1337–1400) of Brook in the parish of Westbury in Wiltshire, thrice a Member of Parliament for Wiltshire and Deputy Justiciar of Ireland in 1373 and Lord Chancellor of Ireland 1383-4 and Deputy Warden of the Cinque Ports.

The Cheney family (alias Cheyney, Cheyne, etc.) Latinized to de Caineto, possibly from the French chêne, an oak-tree, was an ancient family, branches of which were scattered throughout southern England, from Kent to Cornwall, and in the Midlands. Their name survives attached to several of their former manors. The family which inherited Brook was seated at Upottery in Devon from the time of King Henry III (1216-1272).

== Career ==
Edmund was Warden of the Channel Islands 1358–1367.

== Marriage and Family ==
He married a certain Katherine (d.1422), step-mother of the Devonshire heiress Cecily Stretche (c. 1371 – 1430), the wife of his nephew Sir William Cheyne (1374-1420) of Brook, MP for Dorset in 1402, and younger daughter and co-heiress of Sir John Stretch, of Pinhoe and Hempston Arundel in Devon, three times MP for Devon. The marriage was without progeny.

He had at least one daughter, Ann Cheney, who was coheir of his holdings. She was the wife of Sir John Willoughby, Knight.

== Death and succession ==
He died in 1374 or 1383, leaving as his heir his younger half-brother Sir Ralph Cheyne of Brook. His daughter, Ann Willoughby, was coheir.
