= Gorges family =

Medieval and later English family

Location of Gorges in Normandy

Original arms of Gorges, with heraldic gurges or whirlpool: Argent, a gurges azure. These arms were used continuously by the senior line at Tamerton Foliot, but were dropped by the first Baron Gorges in favour of the arms of Morville, which latter he is recorded as having used at the Siege of Caerlaverock in 1300

The Gorges family was a gentry family established in the southwest of England.

== Early history ==
Believed to have come from Gorges in Normandy, the first documented member was Sir Ralph Gorges (died 1272) who held the manor of Wraxall in Somerset. He married Eleanor Morville (died 1291), who apparently brought into the family the manors of Bradpole in Dorset and Knighton on the Isle of Wight. They had a daughter Eleanor, who married Sir John Maltravers (died 1341) and became the mother of John Maltravers, 1st Baron Maltravers, together with a son Sir Ralph Gorges (died 1297) who was the father of Sir Ralph Gorges (died 1323), created Baron Gorges.

His two daughters were his heiresses: Joan Gorges, who married Sir William Cheyne (died 1345) and was mother of Sir Ralph Cheyne, and Eleanor Gorges who married Sir Theobald Russell (died 1341), of Kingston Russell, son of Sir William Russell. She inherited the Gorges manors of Wraxall and Knighton, passing Wraxall to her younger son Theobald Russell (died 1380), later knighted, who adopted the surname and arms of Gorges and so continued the family line.

The younger Theobald had a son Thomas Gorges (died 1403) who married Agnes Beauchamp (died 1419) and was father of Sir Theobald Gorges (died 1470). From his first marriage to Joan Hankford (died 1433), sister of Sir Richard Hankford, he left three children: Joan Gorges who married John Hatch (died 1476), Elizabeth Gorges who married Sir Thomas Grenville (died 1485), and his heir Walter Gorges.

== Gorges of Longford and Dundalk ==
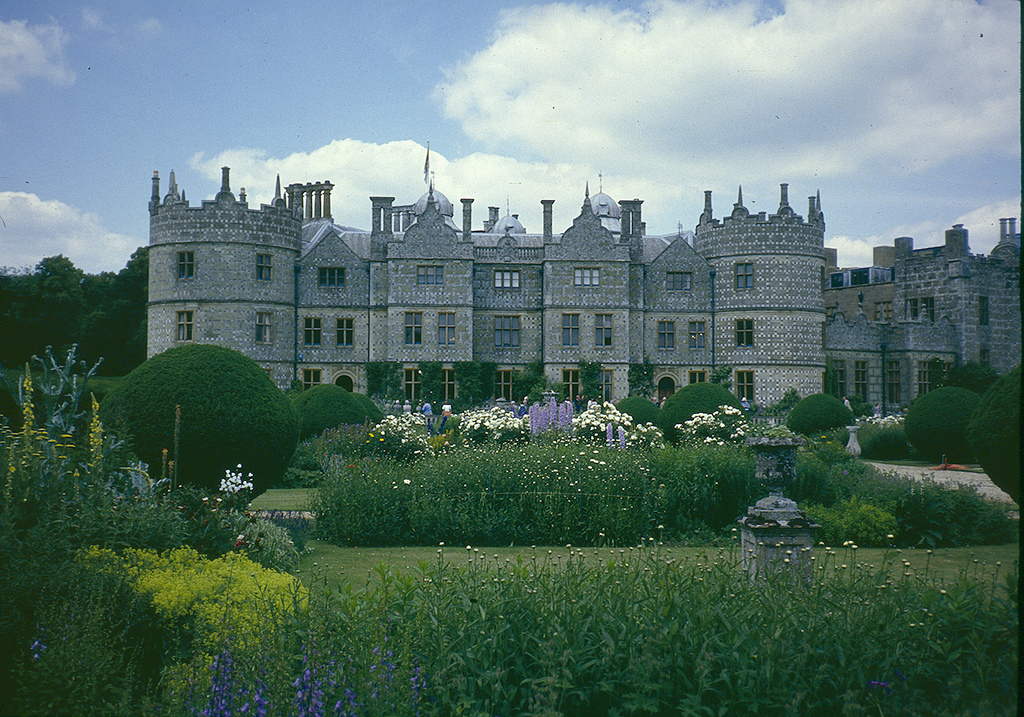
Longford Castle, mansion of Sir Thomas Gorges

Walter Gorges' son was Sir Edmund Gorges (1454–1512), who married Anne Howard and became the father of Sir Edward Gorges (1481–1566). His son, from his second marriage to Mary Poyntz, was Sir Thomas Gorges (1536–1610) who acquired the manor of Longford in Wiltshire in 1573 and built there Longford Castle. He married (as her second husband) Helena Snakenborg, Marchioness of Northampton (1549–1635), a Swedish noblewoman and lady in waiting to Queen Elizabth I, through whose influence Swedish-style architecture was adopted in the construction of the mansion and who has a notable monument in Salisbury Cathedral.

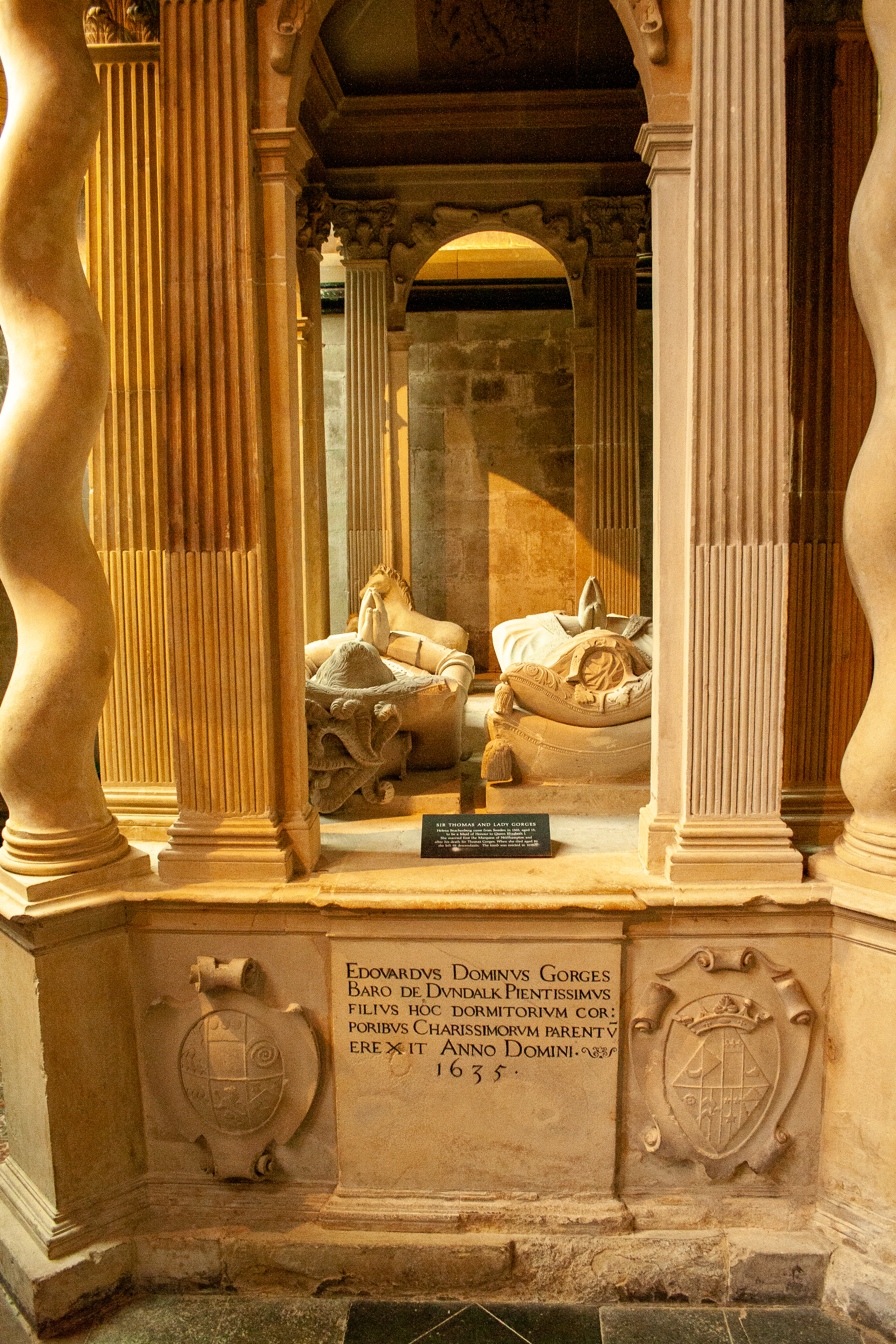
Monument in Salisbury Cathedral of Helena Snakenborg and her second husband Sir Thomas Gorges

Their son Edward Gorges was created a baronet in 1611 and obtained the barony of Dundalk in Ireland. Both he and his son Richard Gorges (died 1712) sat in the Parliament of Ireland for the constituency of Ratoath. Richard Gorges' tomb can be seen in the church of Stetchworth in Cambridgeshire.

== Coat of arms ==
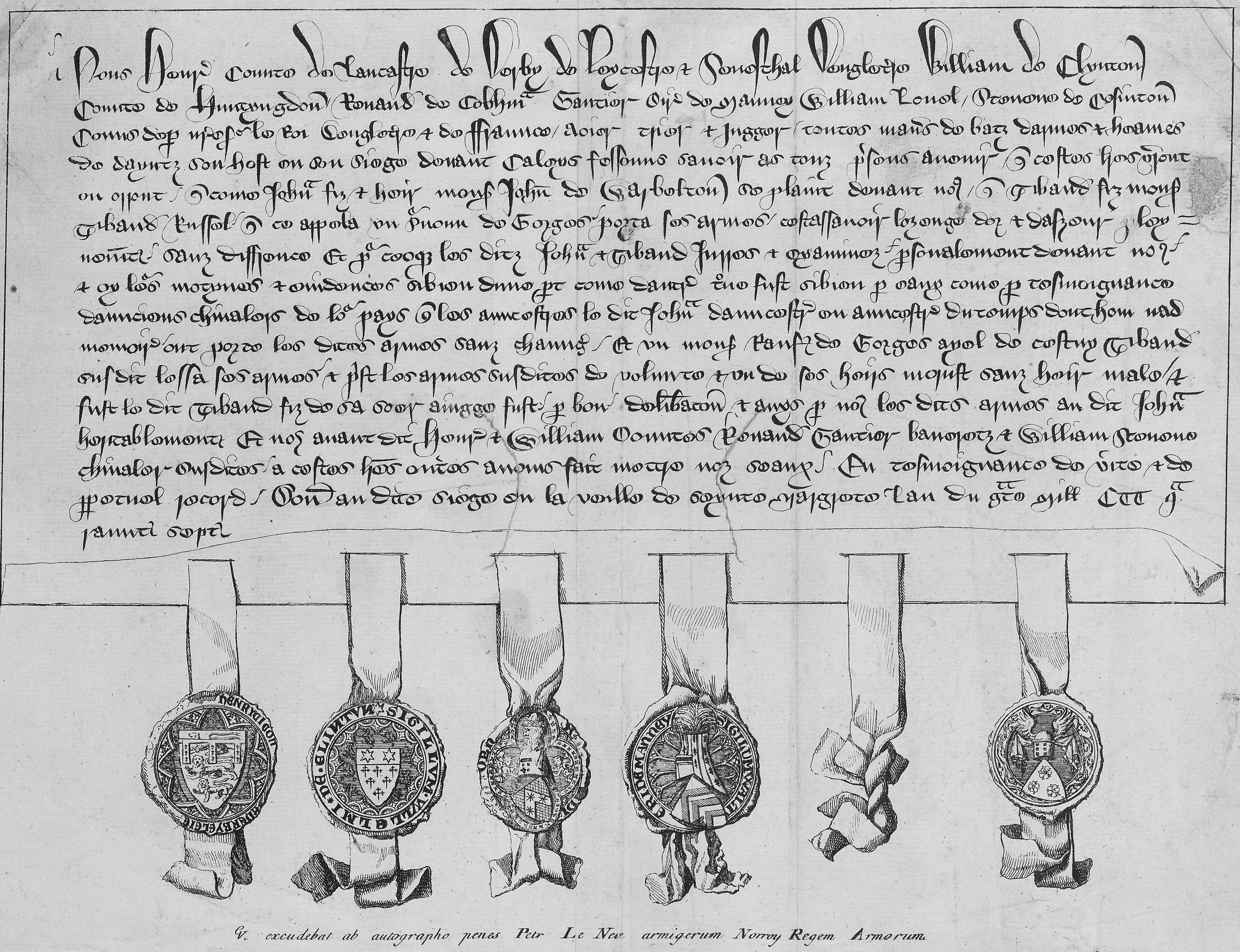
Award of a court of honour convened before Calais in 1347 in the matter of Warbleton vs. Gorges. MS Ashmole 1137, f.143r, Bodleian Library

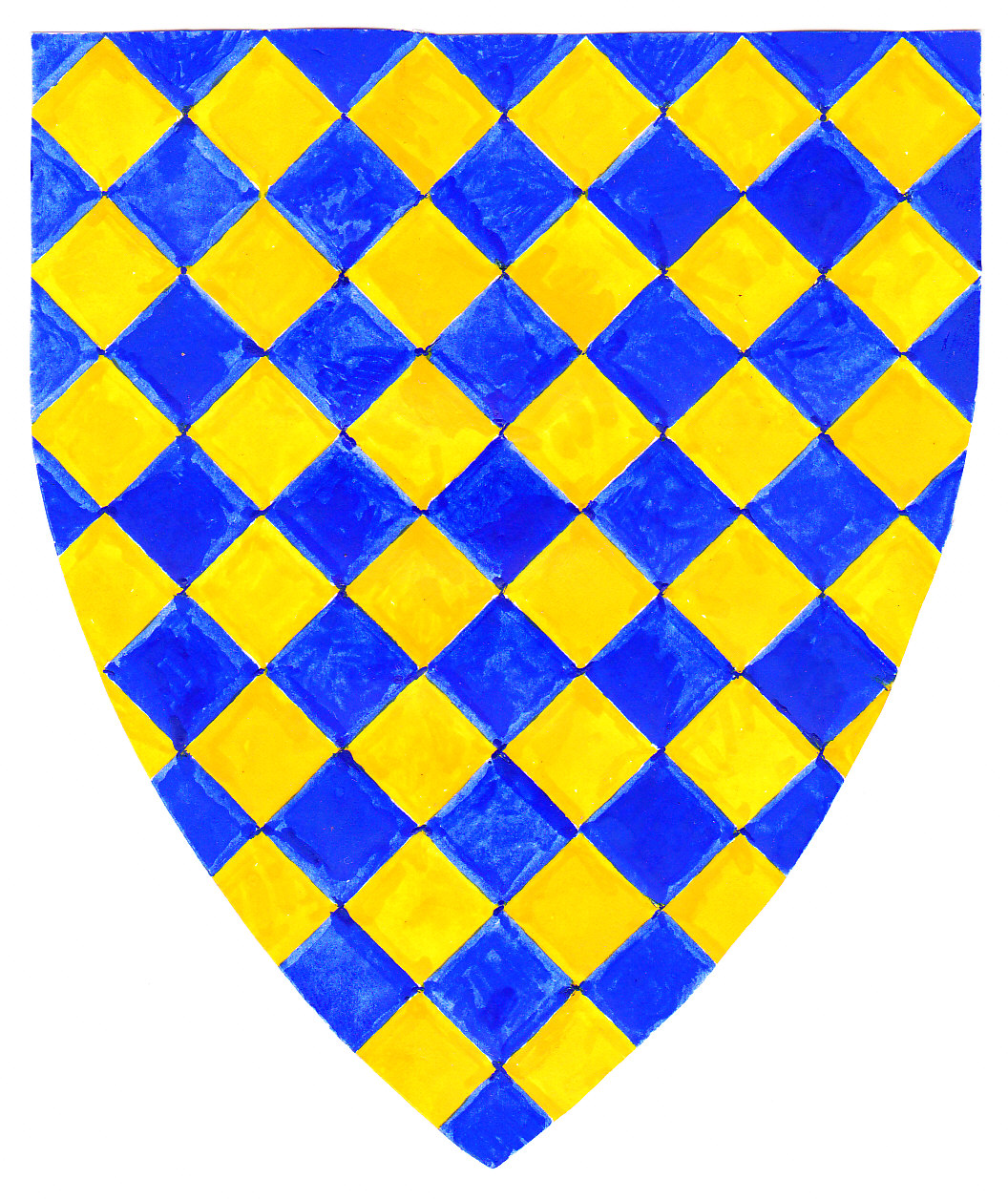
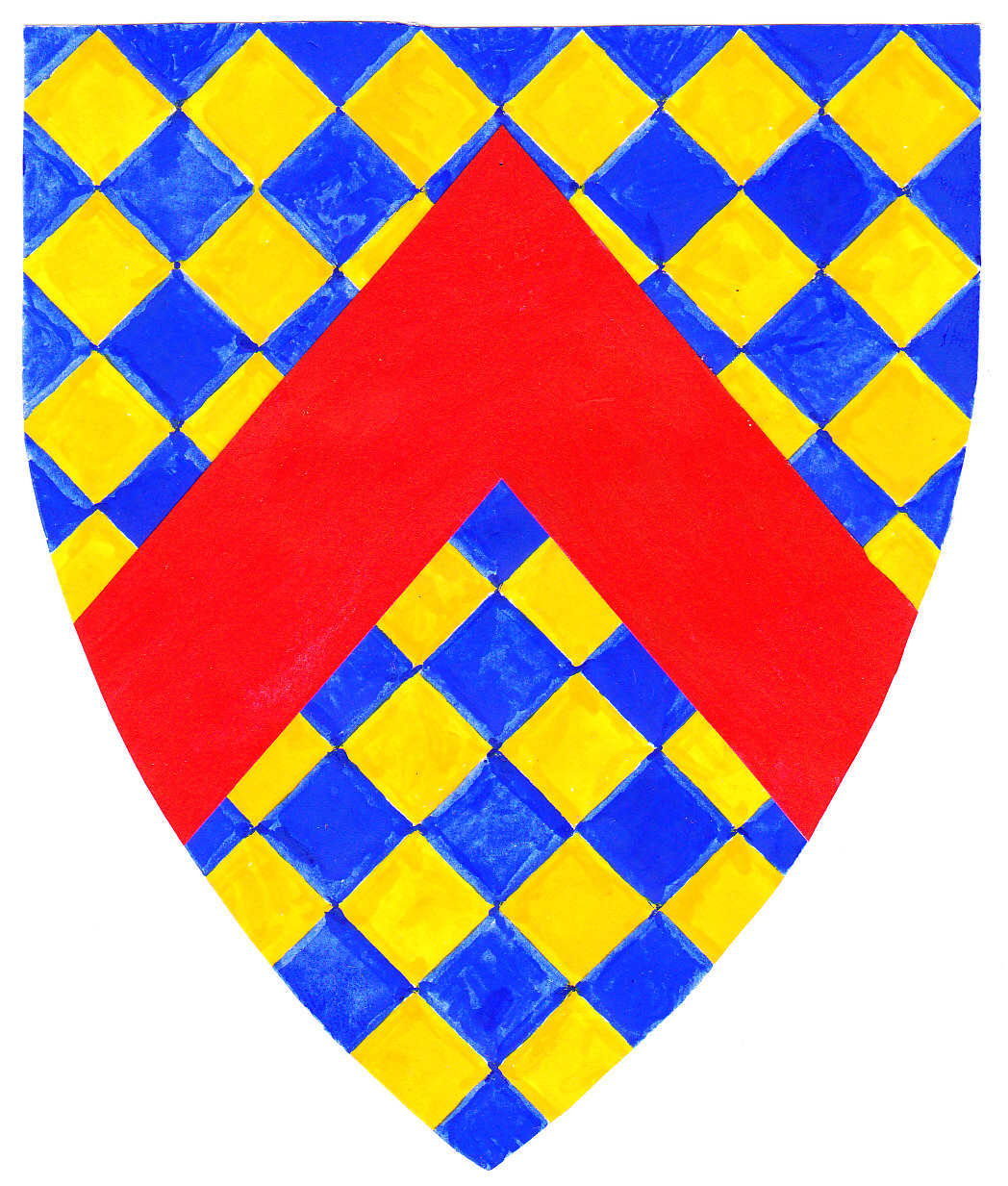
Later arms of Gorges: left, Morville, lozengy or and azure, adopted by the 1st Baron Gorges before 1300 in lieu of his paternal arms; right, arms of Theobald Russell alias Gorges adopted in 1347, known as "Gorges Modern": Lozengy or and azure, a chevron gules
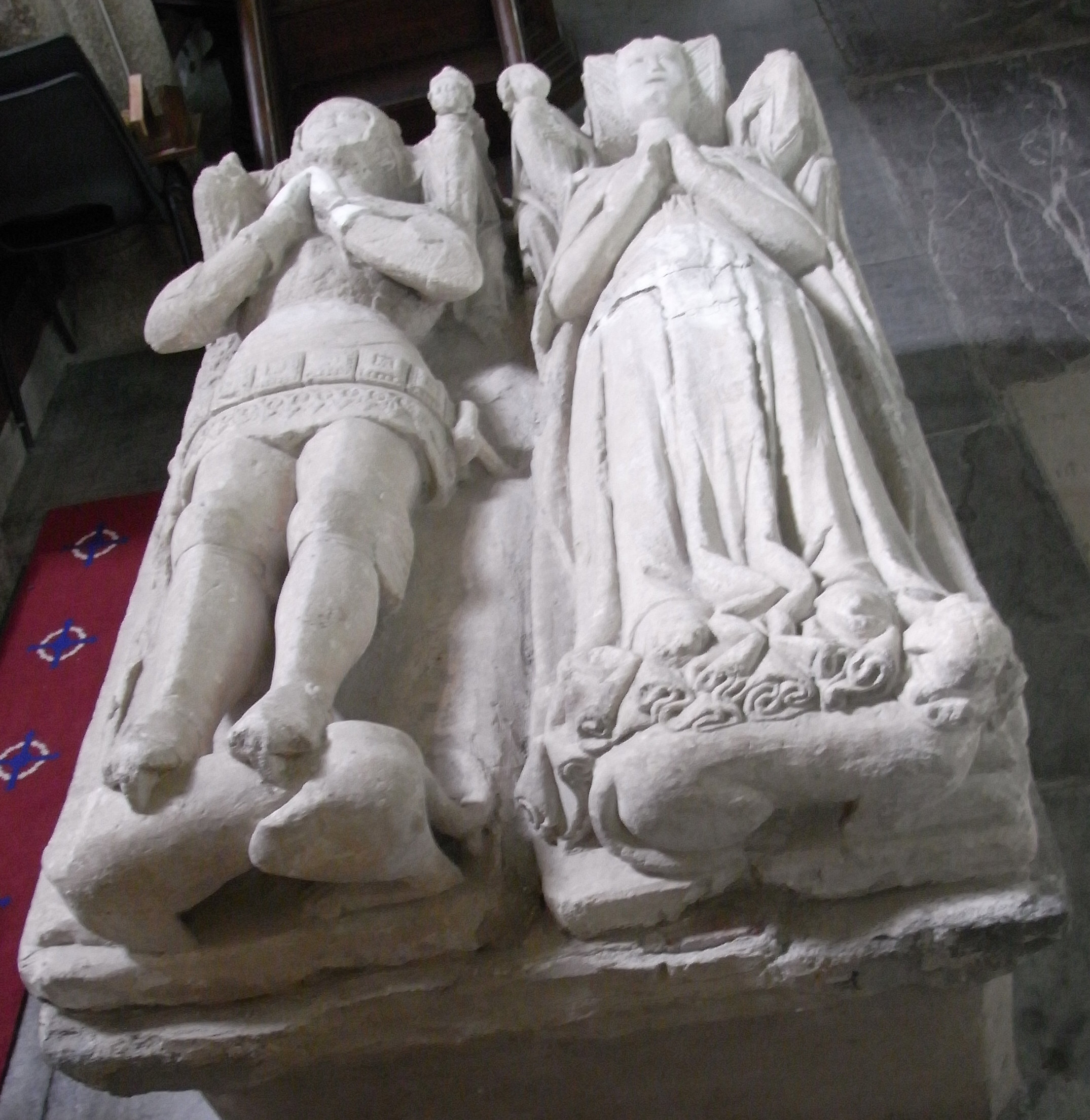
Gorges effigy, St Mary's Church, Tamerton Foliot, perhaps reptesenting John Gorges of Warleigh House, lord of Tamerton Foliot, who flourished at the start of the 15th century, with a 19th-century drawing showing the Gorges whirlpool motif on knight's jupon.

In 1341 Theobald Russell "de Gorges” adopted the Gorges arms used by his uncle and grandfather, that is to say, those taken from their de Morville heiress who brought them Wraxall. In 1347 he was challenged by Sir John Warbleton (or Warburton), a knight from Cheshire who happened to be serving with him at the Siege of Calais, who noticed they both bore the same arms on their shields, "Lozengy or and azure" (a field of gold and blue lozenges). The case was brought before a court of honour convened at Calais and presided over by Henry of Grosmont, Earl of Lancaster which adjudged on 19 July 1347 the disputed arms to Warbleton. Theobald Russell "de Gorges" thus added a "chevron gules" (red chevron) to the de Morville arms as a difference, in order not to contravene the judgement. Thus the new Gorges arms, known as Gorges Modern, became "Lozengy or and azure, a chevron gules", and one of the more celebrated and historic heraldic cases heard in a military court was recorded. This coat of arms was afterwards used by Sir Ferdinando Gorges. The ancient Gorges canting arms of "Argent, a gurges azure", being a blue whirlpool on a white (or silver) background, gurges signifying in Latin a whirlpool, had been retained some generations before by the senior Gorges line seated at Tamerton Foliot, Devon, the cadet line having married the de Morville heiress.

The whirlpool arms as borne by the senior branch can be seen in Tamerton Foliot Church of St. Mary as a whorl in the 9th. quartering on the 1617 Coplestone funerary monument. The Coplestone family inherited Tamerton Foliot by marriage to a Gorges heiress. In the form of 3 concentric annulets the arms were formerly visible sculpted on the tunic of the adjacent knightly effigy, said by Raymond Gorges op.cit to represent John Gorges of Warleigh House, lord of the manor of Tamerton Foliot, who flourished at the start of the 15th century, and his wife. Fire damage has since removed all visible traces of any armorial bearings on the knight's tunic. A pair of the wooden roof bosses of the church at Chagford, Devon, display whorls, believed to be the Gorges arms, as the family was connected with that manor. G.W. Ormerod, in his "Historical sketch of the Parish of Chagford", states that the Gorges family had "a great influence in the parish between 1439 and 1461 being descended in the female line from the Wibberi family".

== Notable Family Members ==
- Baron Gorges
- Baron Gorges of Dundalk, descended from a coheiress of the last Baron Gorges
- Thomas Gorges (1536 - 30 Mar 1610), a courtier and Groom of the Chamber to Queen Elizabeth I[1], and second cousin of Queen Anne Boleyn, mother of Queen Elizabeth I. He was the second husband of Helena Snakenborg, Marchioness of Northampton and the uncle of Arthur Gorges (see below)
- Sir Arthur Gorges (1569–1625) was a poet, translator, and courtier.
- Sir Tristram Gorges (1562–1608) was a sea captain under the command of Sir Francis Drake. He fought against the Spanish Armada and was the jailer of Pedro de Valdez.
- Sir Ferdinando Gorges (1565–1647), called the "Father of English Colonization in North America"[1], was an early English colonial entrepreneur and founder of the Province of Maine in 1622. Gorges himself never set foot in the New World.
- Edward Gorges (1631-1708), MP for Somerset.
- Samuel Gorges (1635-1686), Edward's brother, judge of the Court of Common Pleas (Ireland).

== Sources ==
- Burke, John. A General Dictionary of the Peerages of England, Ireland and Scotland, p. 226, Gorges- baron Gorges, page 226
- Burke, John Bernard. A Genealogical History of the Extinct and Dormant Baronetcies, p. 222
- Fox-Davies, Arthur Charles. A Complete Guide to Heraldry, p. 153
- Lower, Mark Antony. Patronymica Britannica, p. 134
- Burke, John. The General Armory, London, 1884, p. 413
- Mémoires de la Société des antiquaires de Normandie, 2nd bunch, p. 228
- Moule, Thomas. Heraldry of a Fish: Notices of the Principal Families Bearing Fish in their Arms, p. 86
