= Ralph Cheyne =

Member of the Parliament of England

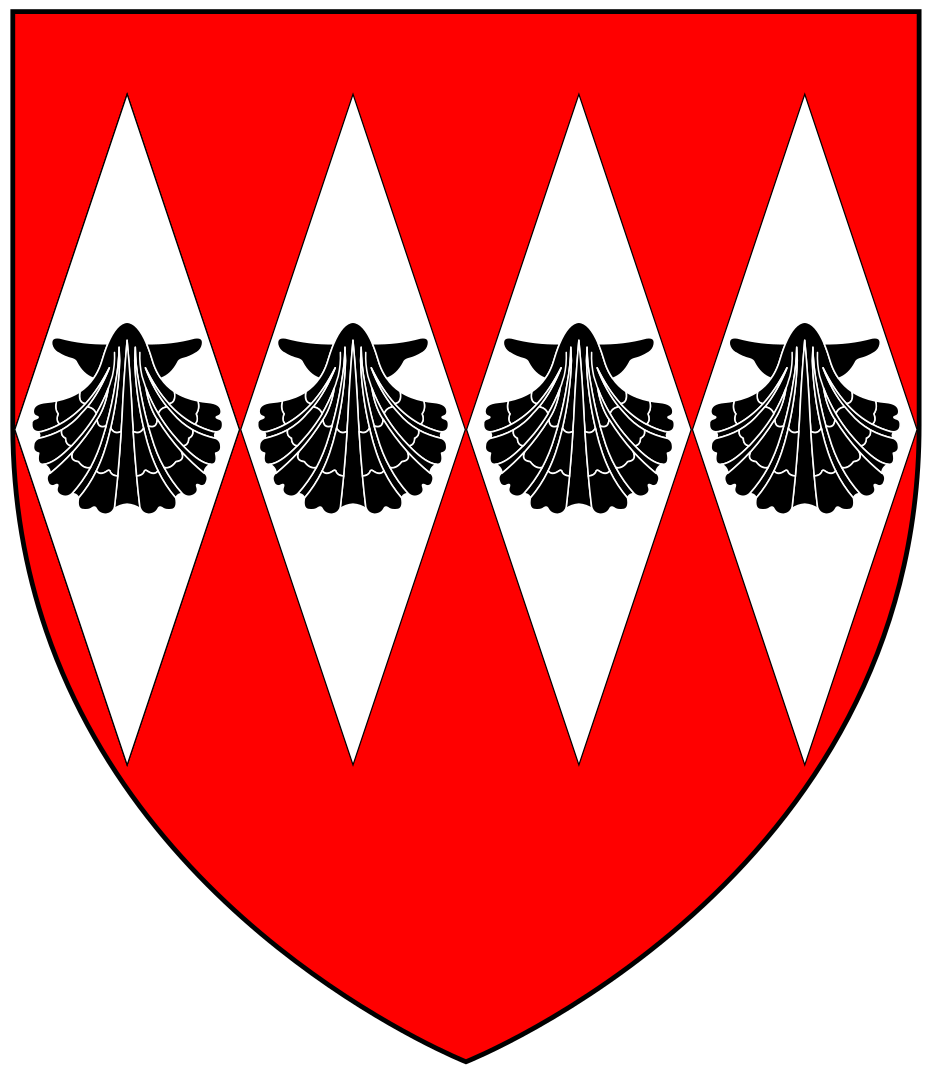
Arms of Cheyne/Cheney: Gules, four fusils in fess argent on each an escallop sable

Sir Ralph Cheyne (c. 1337 – 1400) (alias Cheney), of Brooke, in the parish of Westbury in Wiltshire, was three times a Member of Parliament for Wiltshire and was Deputy Justiciar of Ireland in 1373 and Lord Chancellor of Ireland 1383–4. He was Deputy Warden of the Cinque Ports.

== Origins ==
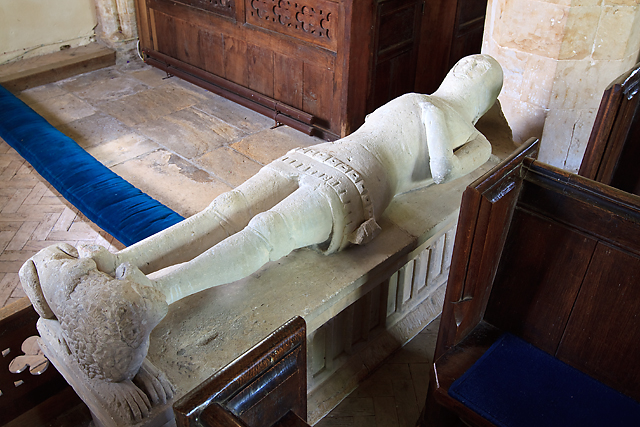
Late 14th century effigy of a knight in All Saints church, Poyntington, possibly of Edmund Cheney (died 1374/83), elder half brother of Sir Ralph Cheney

He was the second son and eventual heir of Sir William Cheyne (died 1345) lord of the manor of Poyntington in Somerset by his second wife Joan Gorges, a daughter of Ralph Gorges of Bradpole in Dorset. His elder half-brother was Sir Edmund Cheyne (died 1374/83), Warden of the Channel Islands, who married a certain Katherine (died 1422) but died without children and whose estates Ralph eventually inherited. Katherine remarried to Sir John Strecch (died 1391) of Wambrook in Somerset. Her ledger stone, with a much-worn black-letter Gothic inscription describing her as "Lady of Poyntington" ("Kath[er]ina St[re]cchi d[omi]na de Pountyngton") survives in Poyntington Church, reset in the south-west wall. It was in 1401 that her penultimate husband's half-nephew Sir William Cheney (died 1420) married the heiress of Stretch of Pinho.

=== Ancient origins ===
Wilhelmina, Duchess of Cleveland (1819–1901) in her 1889 work The Battle Abbey Roll with some Account of the Norman Lineages made some attempt at identifying the ancient origin of this family, called Chaunduit in the lists of Leland. Concerning the armorials of Cheney of Brook, according to the Survey of Cornwall by Richard Carew (died 1620):

"The arms of the Cheneys of Bodanon (in Cornwall) were Gules, on a fesse of four lozenges argent as many escallops sable, in memory (as tradition says) that one of this family going into the Holy Land with Richard or Edward carried such shells for taking up water in the hotter climate of Asia".

== Career ==
He spent part of his official career in Ireland, having apparently been recommended for service there by Robert de Ashton, Lord Chief Justice of Ireland, who was his mother's cousin. He served as Deputy Justiciar of Ireland in 1373, and Lord Chancellor of Ireland 1383–4. Despite only serving a year in the latter role he was handsomely remunerated. He was three times a Member of Parliament for Wiltshire in 1378, 1386 and September 1388 and High Sheriff of Wiltshire for 1376-77 and 1388–89. He served on numerous official commissions throughout his career. He was Deputy Warden of the Cinque Ports.

== Marriage and children ==
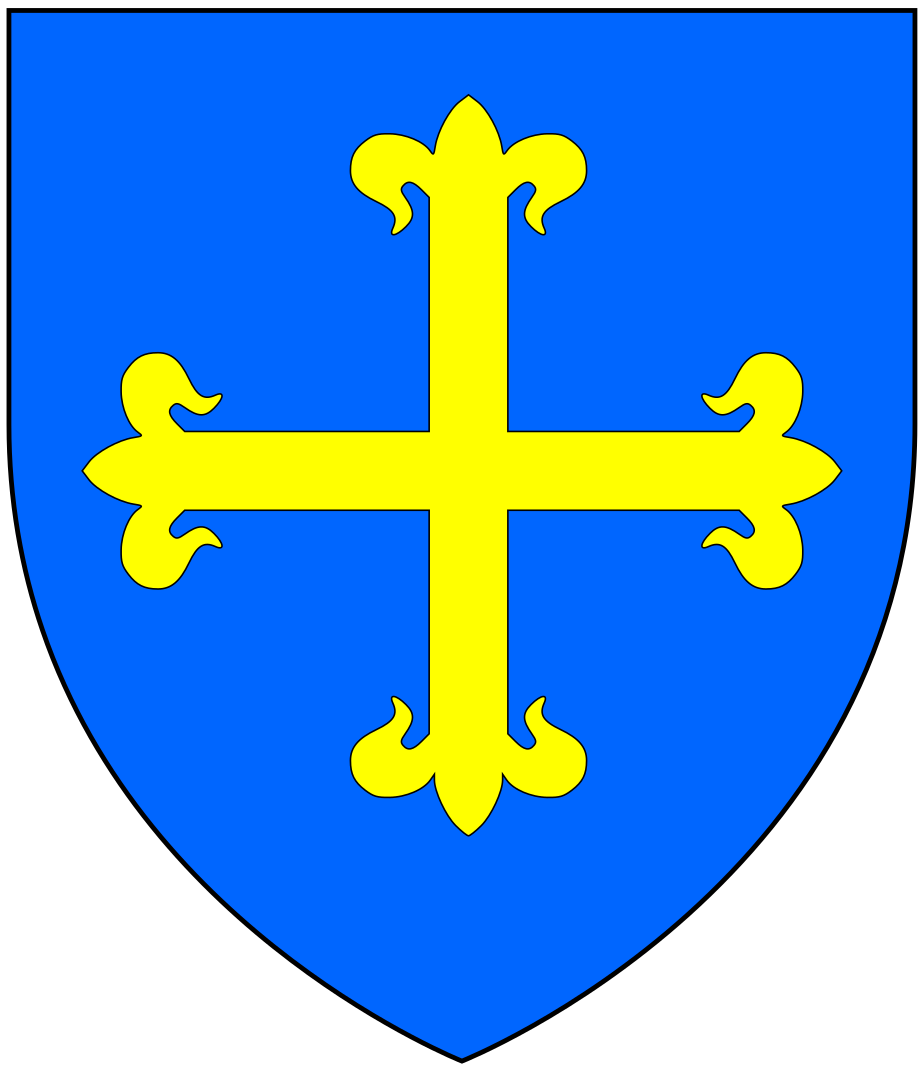
Arms of Paveley: Azure, a cross flory or

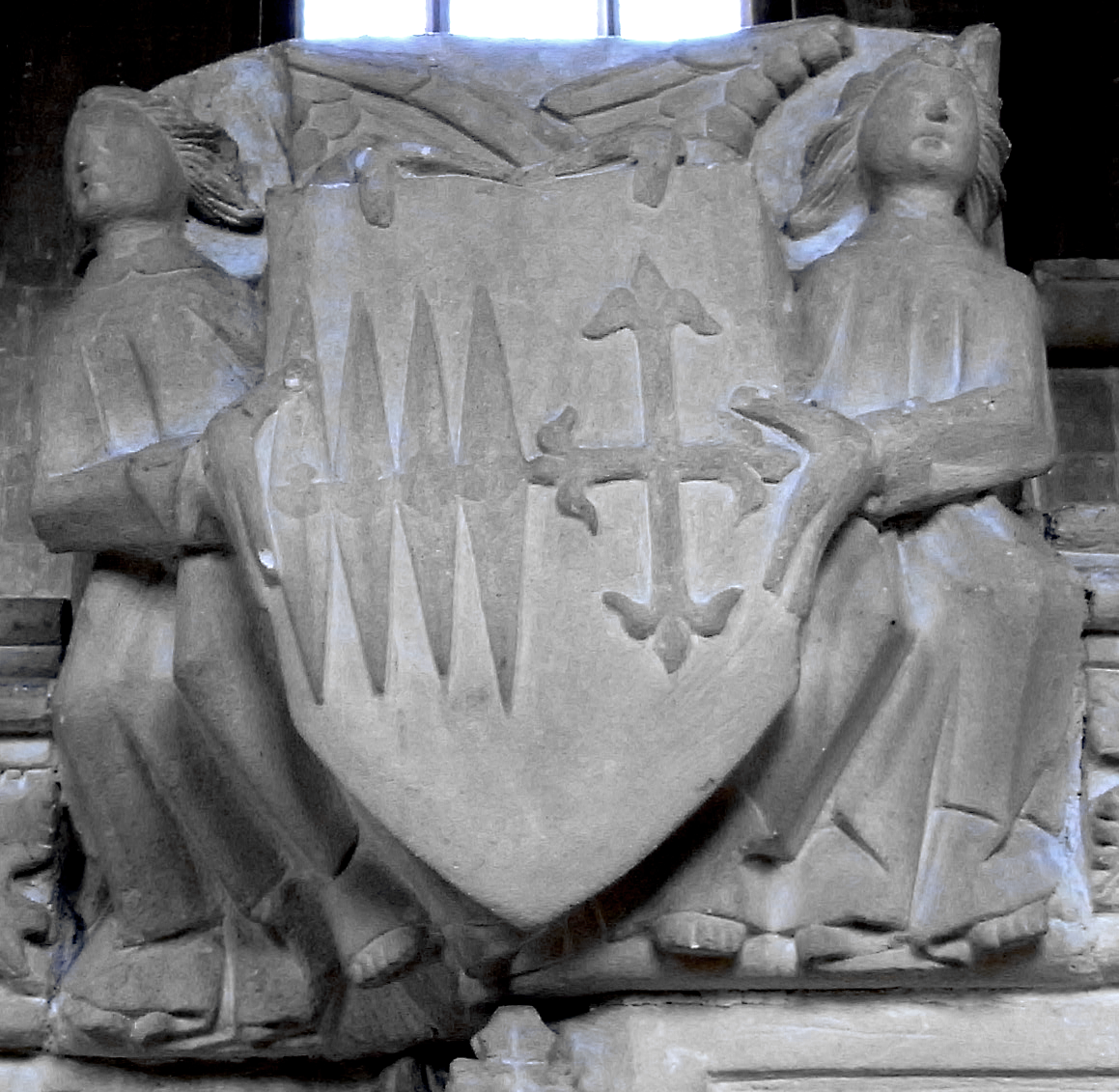
Sculpted escutcheon on monument to Sir Ralph Cheney in Edington Church showing the arms of Cheney impaling Paveley: Azure, a cross flory or

In 1368, he married Joan Pavely (1353 – before 1400), a daughter and co-heiress of Sir John Pavely of Brooke. Through this marriage, he inherited the Brooke manor, which he made his seat. Joan's mother, Agnes de la Mare (d. 1361), was the sister of Robert de la Mare and the daughter of Peter de la Mare of Steeple/Market Lavington, Wiltshire. Before marrying John Pavely, Agnes was first married to John Forstal of Lavington, the brother of Robert Forstal. By his wife, Joan de Pavely, he had one son and heir, Sir William Cheyne (c. 1374 – 1420), MP for Dorset in 1402, who married Cecily Stretch (c. 1371 – 1430), younger daughter and co-heiress of Sir John Stretch, of Pinhoe and Hempston Arundel in Devon, three times MP for Devon. Cecily was the widow of Thomas Bonville (died 1412), third son of Sir William Bonville (died 1408) of Shute in Devon. Sir William had two sons. His eldest son was Edmund Cheyne (died 1430), of Brook, who married Alice Stafford, daughter of Sir Humphrey Stafford of Hooke, and aunt to Humphrey Stafford, 1st Earl of Devon (died 1469). His other son, John Cheyne of Pinhoe, received the manor from his mother Cecily Stretch. His daughter married Sir John Wadham (died 1502) of Merryfield and Edge.

== Death and burial ==
He died on 11 November 1400 and was buried in the Church of Edington Priory in Wiltshire, where survives his chest tomb within its own small chantry chapel.

=== Monument in Edington Priory Church ===
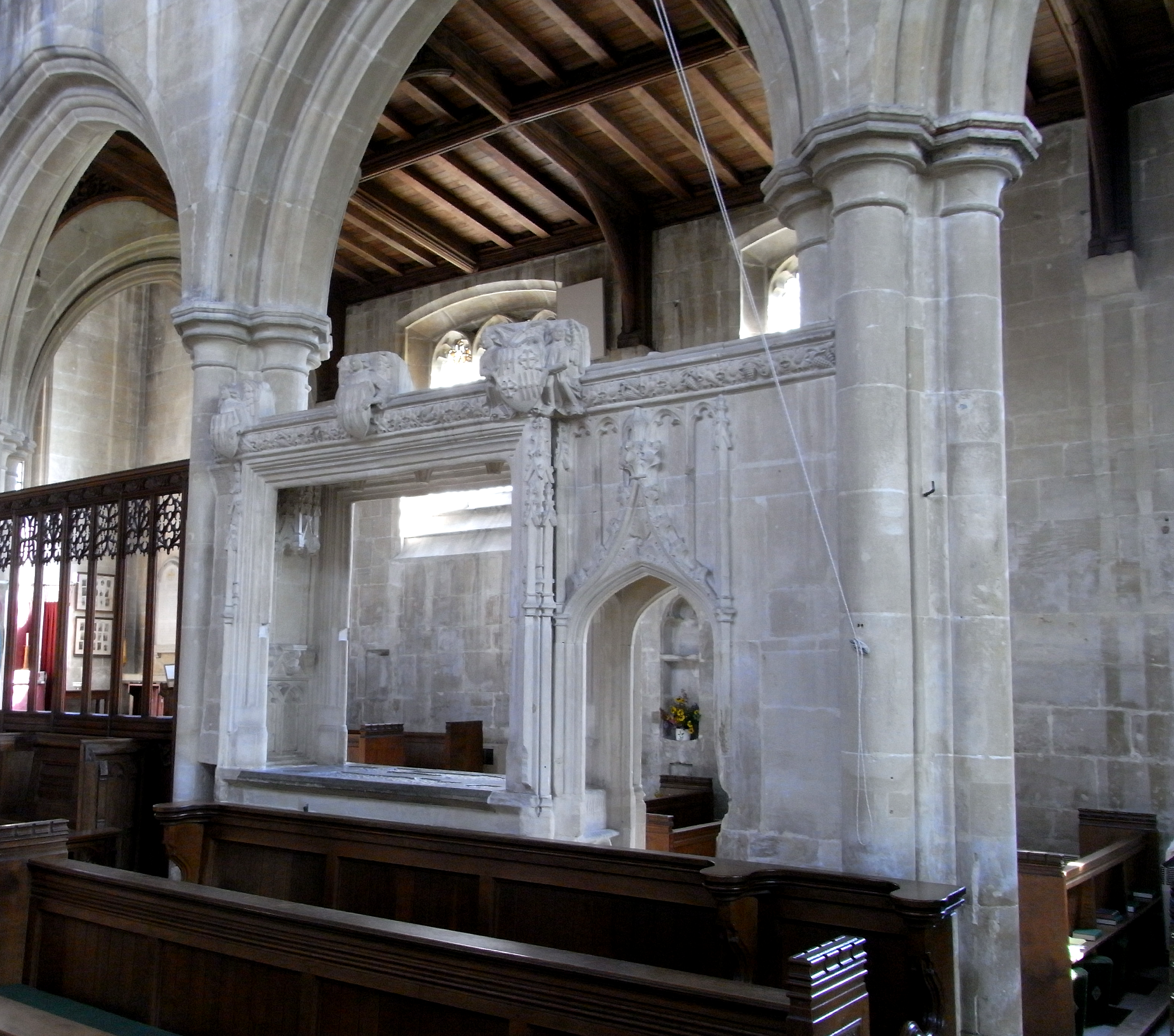
Chantry chapel monument to Sir Ralph Cheney, Edington Priory Church

The ledger stone on top is missing its original monumental brasses, but the stonework of the chantry chapel retains several relief sculptures of heraldic escutcheons, some held by angels. Also shown is the heraldic badge of a ship's rudder, later adopted by Robert Willoughby, 1st Baron Willoughby de Broke (c. 1452 – 1502) (the eventual heir of Brooke) visible on his chest tomb in Callington Church in Cornwall. Hamilton Rogers (1890) described the chantry chapel monument to Sir Ralph Cheney as follows:

"The monument is under the second arch of the nave, west of the transept, in the south aisle. It consists of a high tomb with canopy, flanked by an entrance-doorway forming part of one composition, extending the whole breadth of the arch. This was originally one of the enclosing screens of a Chantry, the other two, east and west, dividing it from the aisle having been removed. In the wall of the aisle opposite the tomb, is a two-storied piscina, which was formerly within the area of the Chantry, and against the east division doubtless stood the antient altar. The cover-stone of the tomb is Purbeck marble, and on it are the indents of a knight and lady, but not of large size. The knight's head appears to have rested on a helmet with lambrequin, and an animal was at his feet. The lady in long robe and head on a cushion. Two shields were above their heads, and two more below their feet. There was no ledger-line. Below the tomb are traceried panels with shields in their centres, on them is carved these arms:—1: A rudder; 2: Four fusils in fess, each charged with an escallop (Cheney); 3: Four escallops, two and two (Erleigh?). These charges are exactly repeated on both sides. The canopy is of square form, flanked by buttresses pinnacled on their faces, and the groining within shews five fan-traceried pendants. At the east end is a large niche, the west is open. The doorway is surmounted by a rich ogee crocketted canopy with finial, and is panelled above. A continuous cornice surmounts both tomb and doorway, of vine foliage and mouldings, crested originally by the Tudor flower, only a part of which now remains. It is broken on each side by four angels holding shields. On the north side are two single angels supporting the arms of Cheney, at the west corner are two angels holding a larger shield quarterly of four, 1 and 4 Cheney; 2 and 3: A cross fleurie (Paveley). On the south side the single angels display the arms of Paveley, and the pair at the end Cheney impaling Paveley. Over the inner doorway the rudder is again carved—here at Edington its earliest appearance. In the churchyard, near the porch, is a large broken Purbeck marble stone, probably removed from the pavement of the Chantry 9 within. On it are the indents of a knight, and lady in horned head-dress, under an ogee crocketted canopy, flanked by pinnacles, evidently of contemporary date with the tomb. Above the figures are two shields, below their feet the space is powdered with scrolls, and a ledger-line enclosed the whole."

== Rudder heraldic badge ==
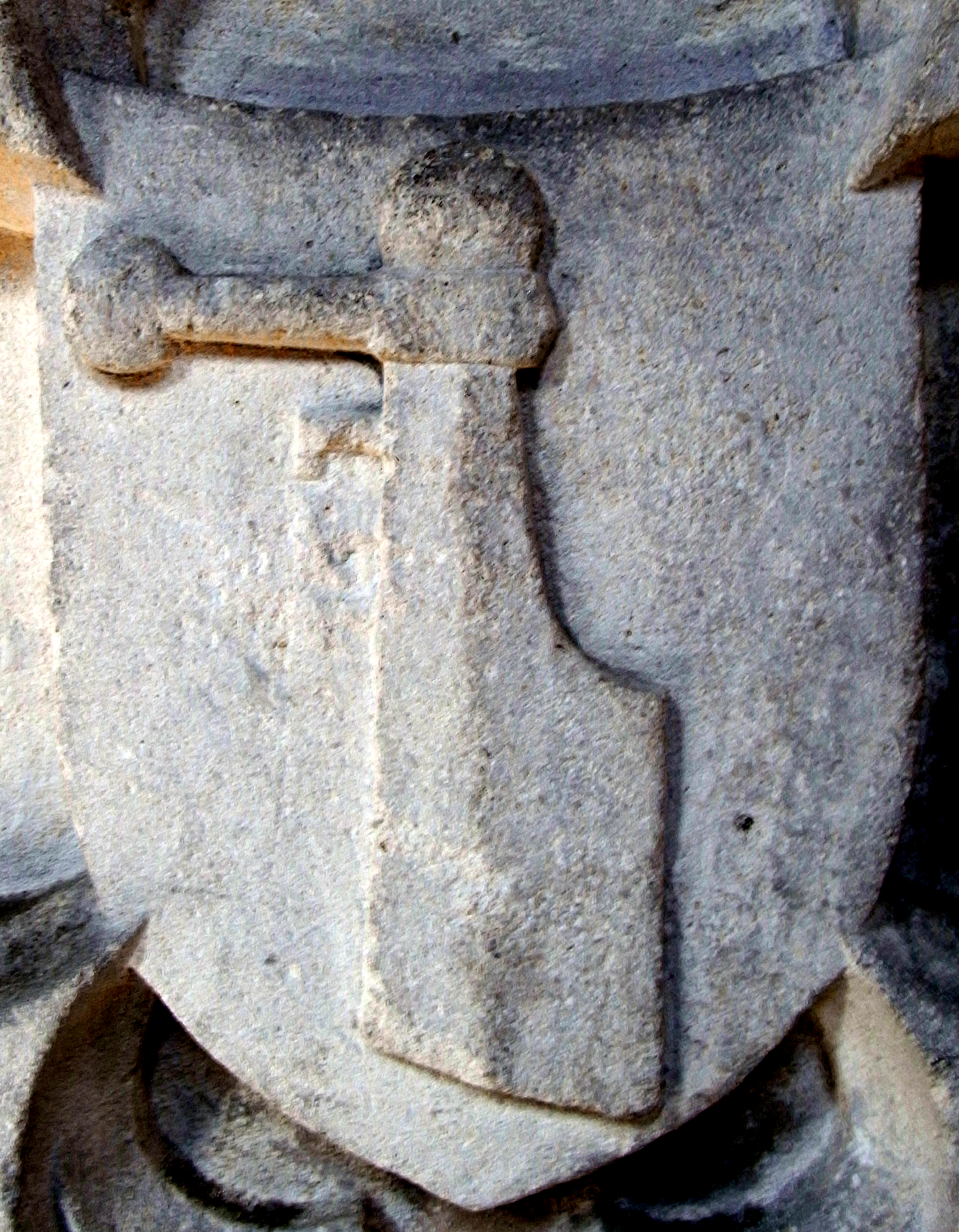
Rudder heraldic badge, relief sculpture on monument of Sir Ralph Cheney, Edington Priory Church

Cheney's heraldic badge was a rudder, apparently first adopted by his ancestors the Pavely family of Brook. Aubrey stated concerning his visit to Brook Hall: "Mr Wadman would persuade me that this rudder belonged to the Paveleys who had this place here". Use of the Rudder badge descended to Cheney and then to Willoughby. Camden stated of Cheney's descendant: "Lord Willoughby, by report Admiral, used the helme of a ship for the seal to his ring". Aubrey asserted that it had been used by "Lord Willoughby de Broke" in the reign of Edward III. However "there was no such baron until Hen. VII. and no Willoughby, Admiral, appears in Rapin's List".

The device of a Rudder in stained glass windows was recorded by John Leland (1503–1552) when he visited Brook. It survives today in Edington Church, and Aubrey noted the presence in a chapel south of the chancel in Westbury Church "in one window some rudders of ships or". Also present in the church of Seend.

== Sources ==
- Woodger, L. S., biography of Cheyne, Sir Ralph (c. 1337 – 1400), of Brooke in Westbury, Wilts., published in History of Parliament: House of Commons 1386-1421, ed. J.S. Roskell, L. Clark, C. Rawcliffe., 1993
