= Brook, Heywood =

Estate in Heywood, Wiltshire, England

Coordinates: 51.2801°N 2.2156°W

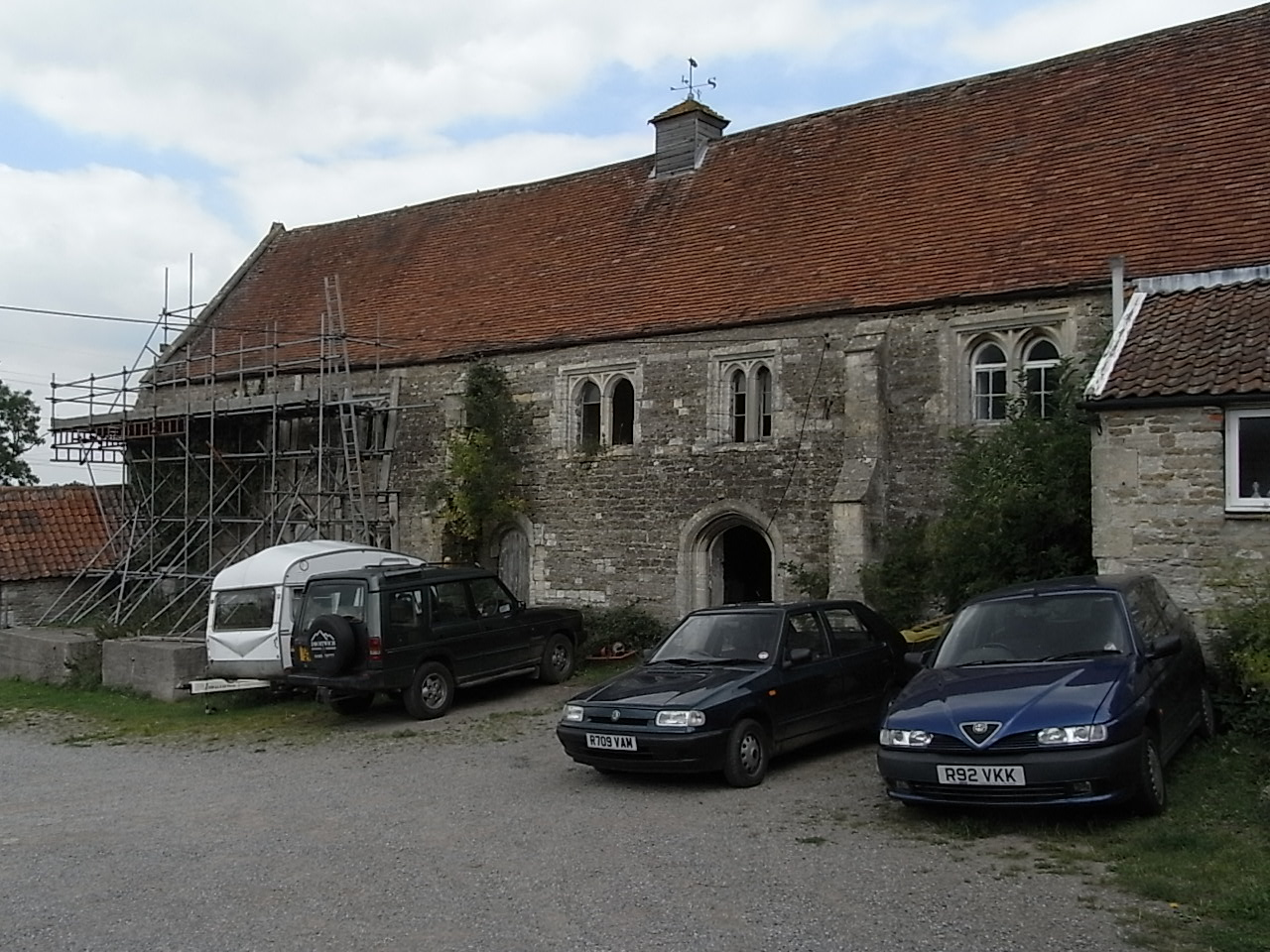
Mediaeval wing of Brook Hall, looking north-westwards, 2011

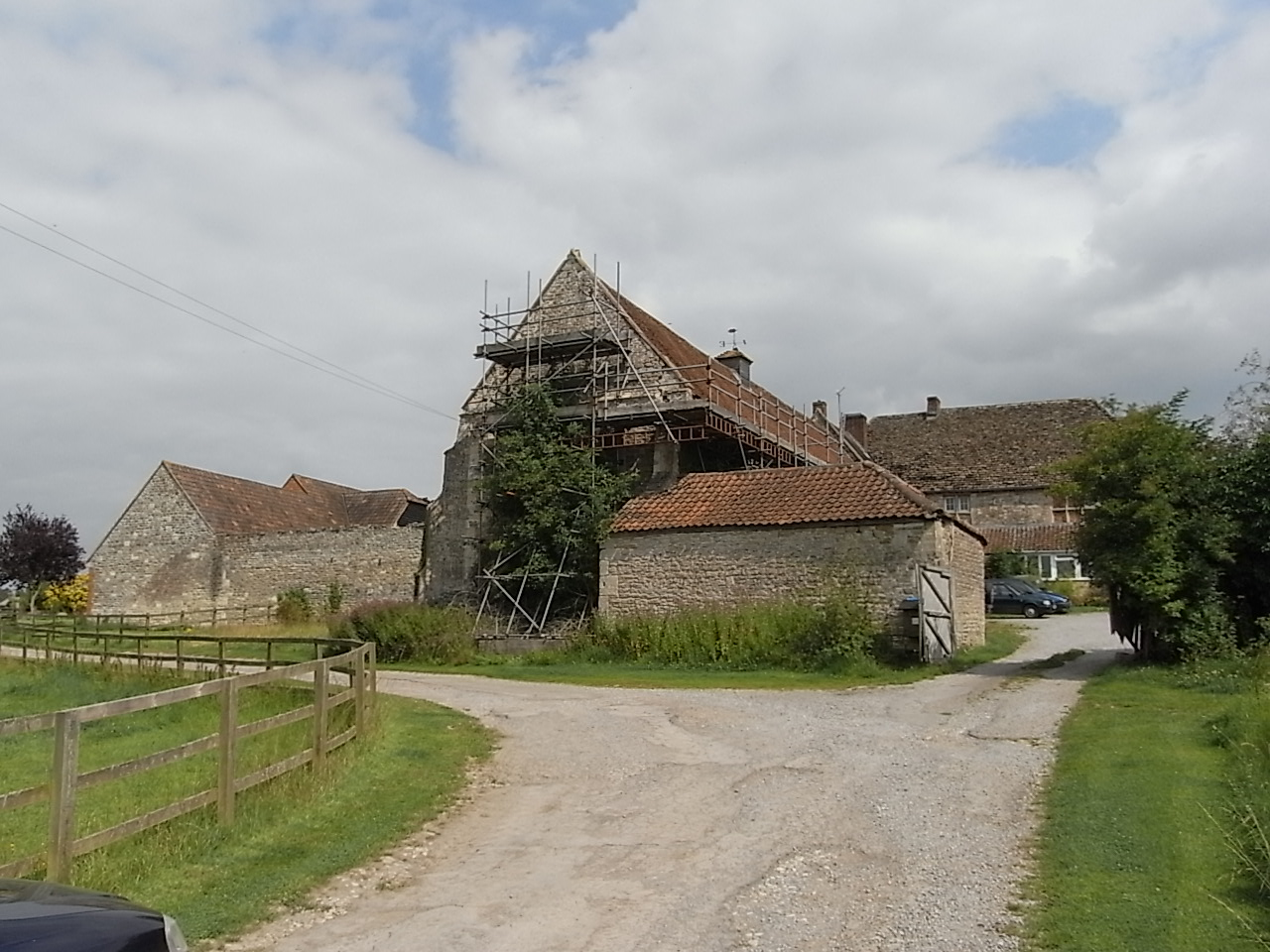
Brook Hall viewed from S-W, 2011. The western gable-end of the mediaeval wing, shored-up with scaffolding, is visible in centre

Brook in the parish of Heywood, north of Westbury in Wiltshire, England, is an historic estate. It was the seat of Robert Willoughby, 1st Baron Willoughby de Broke (c. 1452 – 1502), KG, an important supporter of King Henry VII, whose title unusually incorporates the name of his seat, in order to differentiate him from his ancestors Barons Willoughby of Eresby, seated at Eresby Manor near Spilsby in Lincolnshire. A medieval wing survives of the mansion house known as Brook Hall, a Grade I listed building which stands near the Biss Brook.

== History ==
The estate was held by Stanley Abbey from the 13th century until the Dissolution. It formed part of Westbury parish until 1896, when Heywood civil parish was created from the northern part of Westbury.

== Descent ==
=== Paveley ===
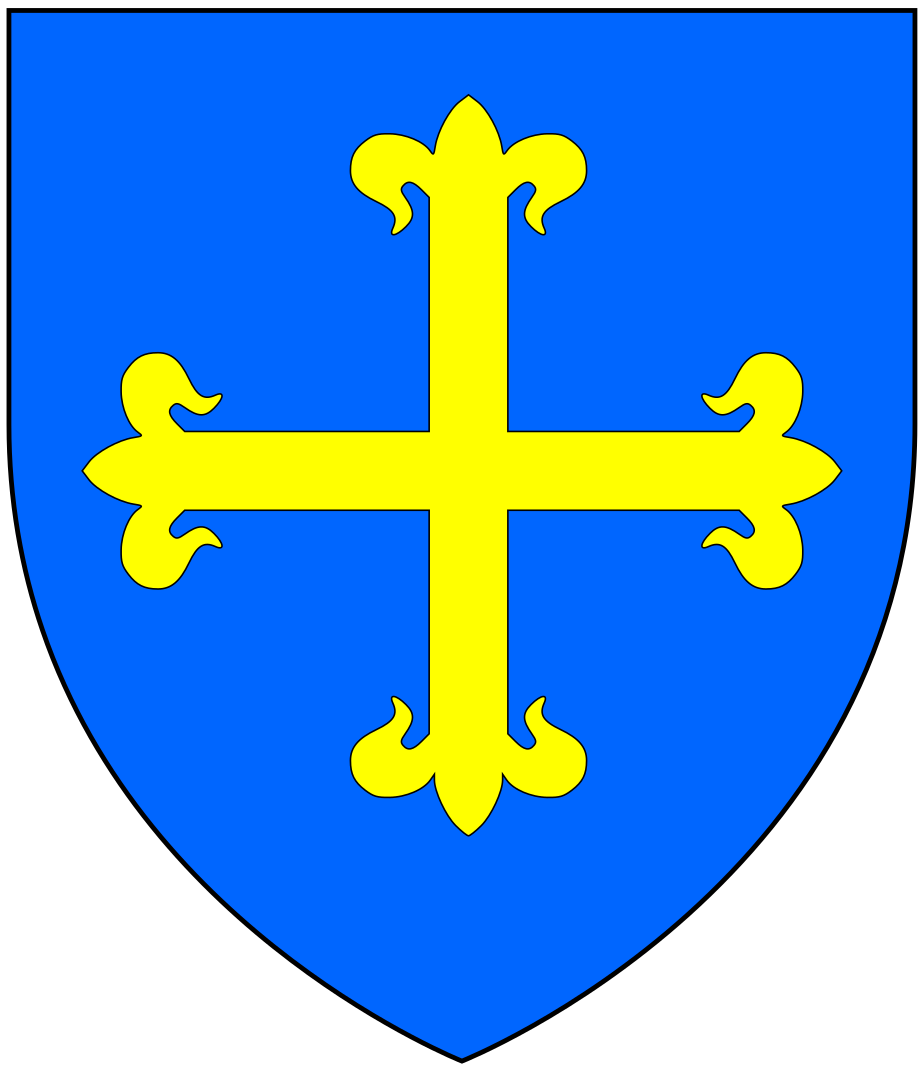
Arms of Paveley: Azure, a cross flory or. Shape of cross as visible on the monument to Sir Ralph Cheney (d.1400) of Brook, in Edington Priory Church

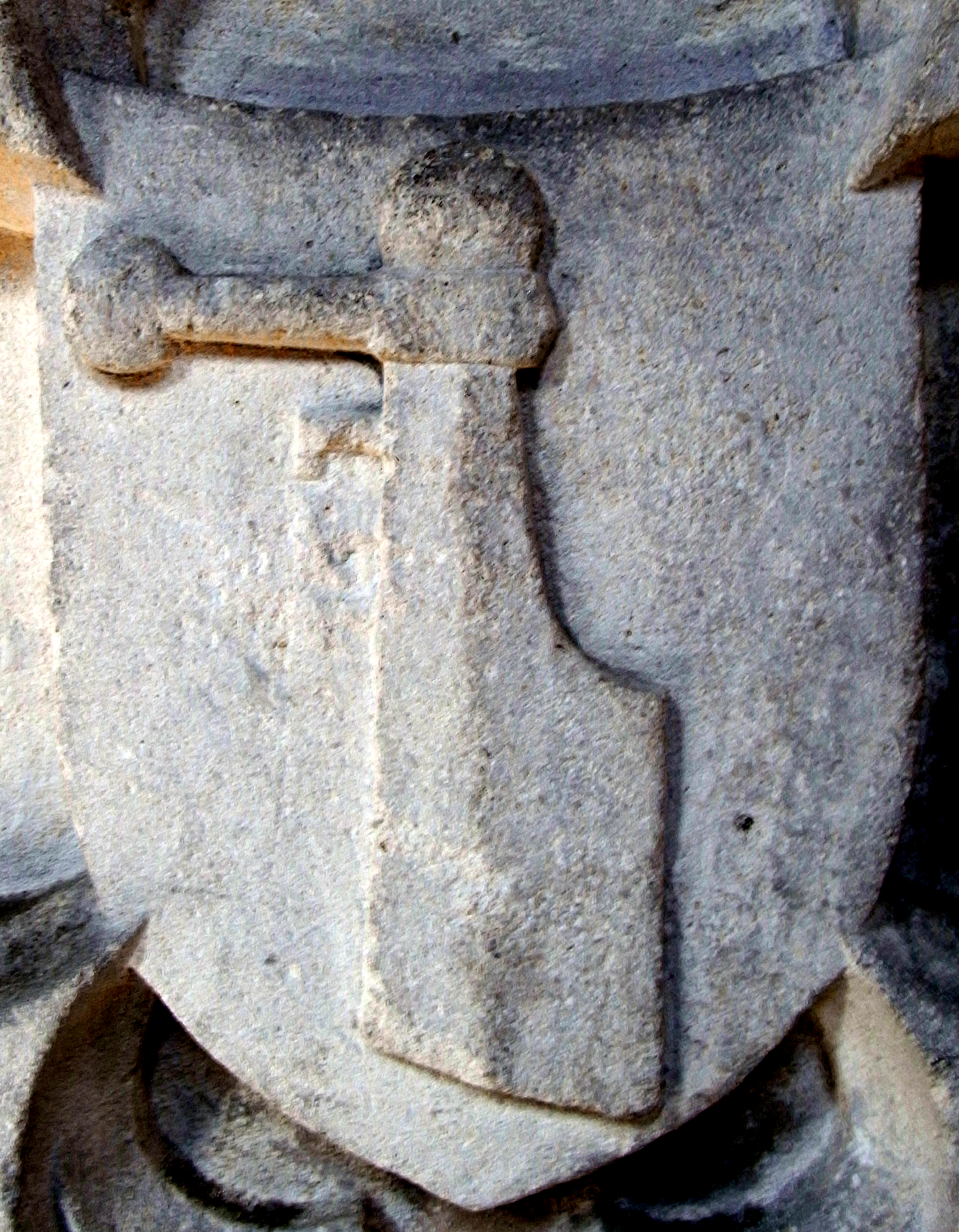
Heraldic badge of a rudder, first adopted by the Paveley family, as Aubrey stated concerning his visit to Brook Hall: "Mr Wadman would persuade me that this rudder belonged to the Paveleys who had this place here". It was later used by Sir Ralph Cheney and by Robert Willoughby, 1st Baron Willoughby de Broke, and appears sculpted on the monuments of both men.

The earliest recorded holder is the Paveley family, which held it in the reign of Henry I of England (1100–1135). Rogers gives the descent of Brook as follows:

- Reginald de Paveley, lord of the manor of Westbury
- Walter I de Paveley
- Walter II, lord of the manor of Westbury in 1255.
- Reginald de Paveley (died 1279)
- Walter de Paveley (died 1323), of Hilperton, Wiltshire, Sheriff of Wiltshire, 1297. He married (2nd) Alice _____.
- Reginald de Paveley, Knt. (born about 1293, died 1347), of Westbury and Brook (in Westbury), Wiltshire, Sheriff of Wiltshire, 1335–6, younger son. He married (2nd) by license dated 22 June 1333 Alice Wallis (died 1346), widow of John de Saint John, Knt. (died 1329), 1st Lord Saint John of Lageham. His relative appears to have been Sir Walter Paveley (1319–1375) Knight of the Garter, of Kent, a Knight Founder of the Order of the Garter and the son of Sir Walter Paveley (died 1327) of Kent, by his wife and Maud Burghersh (1304 – c. 1366), daughter and heiress of Sir Stephen Burghersh (died 1310), the elder son of Robert Burghersh (died 1306).
- John de Paveley, who married Agnes de la Mare, but died without male progeny. His two daughters and co-heiresses were as follows:
  - Joan de Paveley (1353 – d.pre-1400), heiress of Brook, who married Sir Ralph Cheyne (c. 1337 – 1400);
  - Alice de Paveley, who married Sir John St Loe (died 1366), MP. St Loe survived his wife and on 20 Nov 1368 (sic), a moiety of the profits of the fair of Westbury (previously granted in 1297 to Walter de Pavilly by King Edward I) was delivered to him to hold by Courtesy of England. He died without male progeny leaving several daughters as co-heiresses, between whom and the Cheneys there were arguments concerning the distribution of the Paveley estates. Cheyne had married Joan Paveley in 1368, after the Paveley estates had been divided between Joan and her sister Alice, and he deemed Joan's share to have been inadequate. He thus obtained the making of a second partition which was more favourable to his wife and by which he gained moieties of the hundred of Westbury and the manor of Brooke, a half-share of the profits of the view of frankpledge and the market and fair at Westbury, the hamlets of Ditteridge and Hawkeridge and £6 of yearly rent from the manor of Westbury.

=== Cheney ===
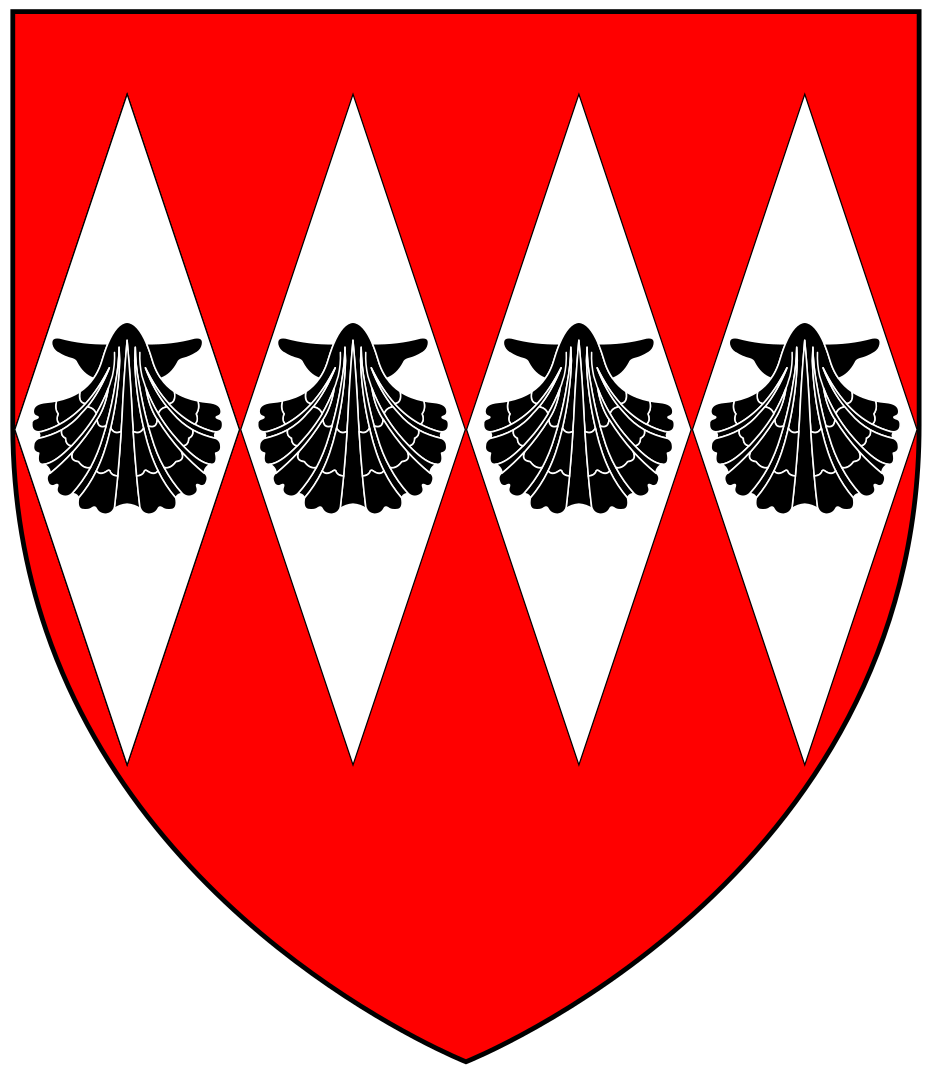
Arms of Cheney: Gules, four fusils in fess argent on each an escallop sable

The Cheney family (alias Cheyney, Cheyne, etc.) Latinized to de Caineto, possibly from the French chêne, an oak-tree, was an ancient family, branches of which were scattered throughout southern England, from Kent to Cornwall, and in the Midlands. Their name survives attached to several of their former manors. The family which inherited Brook was seated at Upottery in Devon from the time of King Henry III (1216–1272).

==== Sir Ralph Cheyne (c.1337–1400) ====
Sir Ralph Cheyne (c. 1337 – 1400), was thrice a Member of Parliament for Wiltshire and was Deputy Justiciar of Ireland in 1373 and Lord Chancellor of Ireland 1383–4. He was Deputy Warden of the Cinque Ports. His monumental chantry chapel survives in Edington Priory Church in Wiltshire. He was the 2nd son and eventual heir of Sir William Cheyne (died 1345) of Poyntington in Somerset by his 2nd wife Joan Gorges, a daughter of Ralph Gorges, 1st Lord Gorges of Dundalk in the peerage of Ireland, of Bradpole in Dorset. Sir Ralph Cheyne inherited the estates of his childless elder half brother Sir Edmund Cheyne (d.1374/83), Warden of the Channel Islands. Sir Ralph Cheyne married Joan Pavely (1353 – d.pre-1400), daughter and co-heiress of Sir John Pavely, of Brook (in Westbury), Wiltshire.

==== Sir William Cheyne (c.1374–1420) ====
Sir William Cheyne (c. 1374 – 1420), only son and heir, MP for Dorset in 1402. He married Cecily Stretch (c. 1371 – 1430), younger daughter and co-heiress of Sir John Stretch, of Pinhoe and Hempston Arundel in Devon, Sheriff of Devon, 1379–80, Sheriff of Somerset and Dorset, 1383–4, Knight of the Shire for Devon, 1385, 1386, 1388, by his 1st wife, Maud, daughter and heiress of John Multon, Knt. Cecily was the widow of Thomas Bonville, third son of Sir William Bonville (died 1408) of Shute in Devon. Sir William Cheyne's younger son was John Cheyne, who was given by his mother the manor of Pinhoe, where he established his own family, having married Elizabeth Hill, daughter of John Hill of Spaxton.

==== Sir Edmund Cheyne (d.1430) ====
Sir Edmund Cheyne (born 1401, died 1430), eldest son and heir, of Brook, MP for Wiltshire in 1429. He married Alice Stafford (died 1469), widow of William Boteler, de jure 6th Baron Sudeley (died 1417), of Sudeley in Gloucestershire, and daughter of Sir Humphrey Stafford II of Hooke, "With the Silver Hand," of Hooke, Dorset and of Southwick, Wiltshire, by his wife Elizabeth Mautravers (died 1420), daughter of Sir John Mautravers of Hooke. Alice Stafford was the aunt of Humphrey Stafford, 1st Earl of Devon (died 1469). Alice survived her second husband and married (3rd) Walter Tailboys, of Newton-Kyme, Yorkshire, by whom she had a daughter Eleanor, wife of Thomas Strangeways, of Melbury, Dorset, ancestor to the Earls of Ilchester. Sir Edmund Cheyne's landholdings included: Brook (in Westbury), Avon (in Bremhill), Ditteridge (in Box), and Imber, Wiltshire, Cheyneys (in Steeple Morden) and French Ladys (in Long Stanton), Cambridgeshire, Birch, Fair Oak (in Upottery), Rawridge (in Upottery), and Upottery, Devon, Cheyney-Cottered (in Cottered), Hertfordshire, Poyntington and Norton Hawkfield (in Chew Magna), Somerset, etc. Sir Edmund Cheyne died without male progeny, leaving two daughters and co-heiresses:

- Elizabeth Cheney (1424 – c. 1492), eldest daughter, wife of Sir John Coleshill, of Duloe, Cornwall, MP for Cornwall in 1453–1454 and Sheriff of Cornwall in 1466/7.
- Anne Cheney (born 1428), younger daughter and heiress of Brook, who married Sir John Willoughby (died 1471), who was knighted at the Battle of Tewkesbury. Her son was Robert Willoughby, 1st Baron Willoughby de Broke (c. 1452 – 1502), the eventual heir of Brooke.

=== Willoughby ===
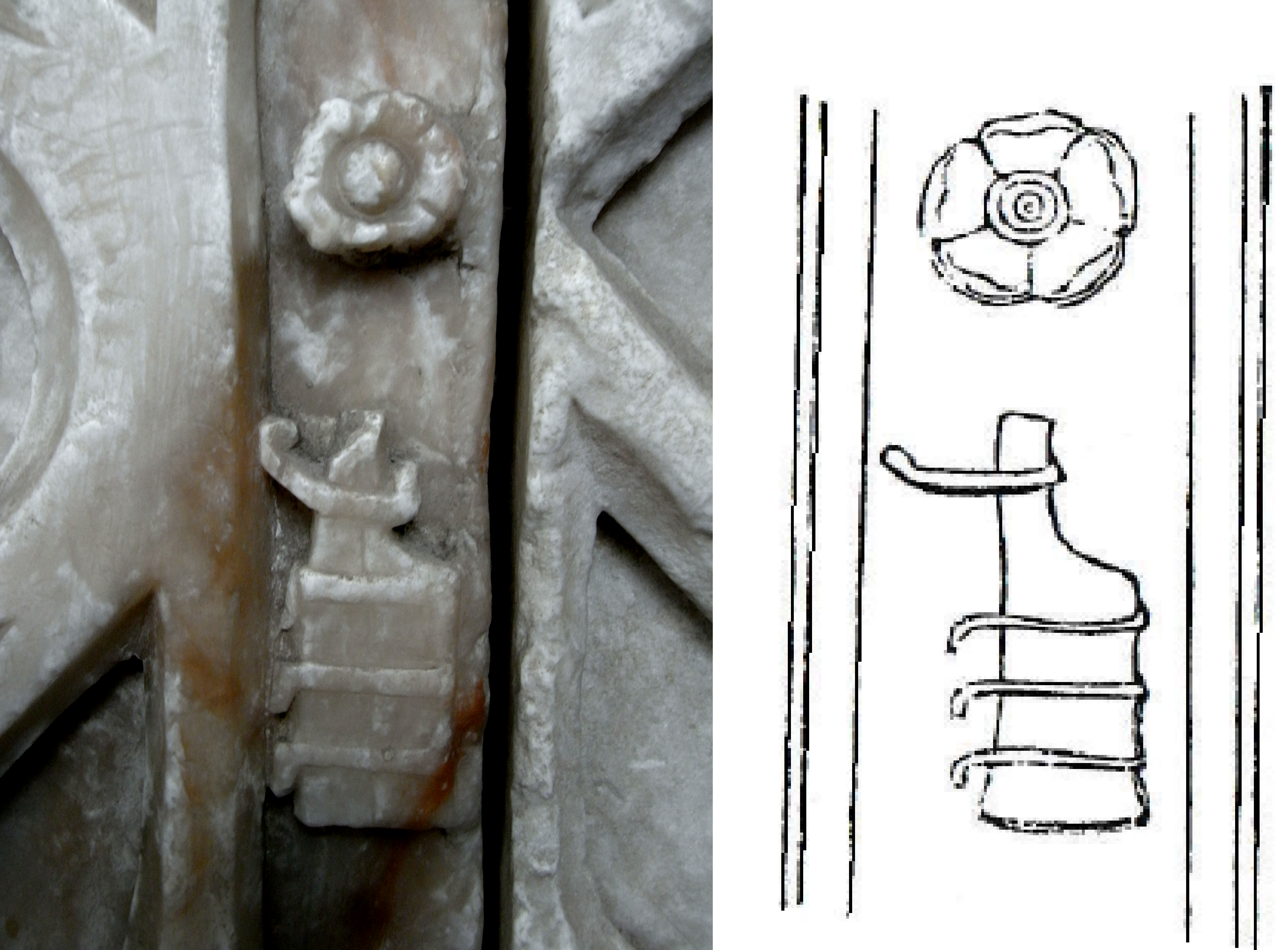
Rudder heraldic badge (apparently originated by the Paveleys of Brook) sculpted on the alabaster monument of Robert Willoughby, 1st Baron Willoughby de Broke (died 1502) in Callington church, Cornwall, with drawing by Rogers (1877)

Robert Willoughby, 1st Baron Willoughby de Broke (died 1502), was born and raised at Brook Hall. A close confidante of Henry VII, he was created the first Baron Willoughby de Broke.

He rebuilt Brook Hall and installed many heraldic stained glass windows, which were recorded and described in 1650 by John Aubrey on his visit to Brook. A common image in these windows was the heraldic badge of a rudder, which was noted earlier by John Leland (1503–1552) when he visited Brook. Sir Ralph Cheney's heraldic badge was a rudder, as is visible sculpted on his monument in Edington Priory church, but had apparently first been adopted by his ancestors the Paveley family of Brook. Aubrey stated concerning his visit to Brook Hall: "Mr Wadman would persuade me that this rudder belonged to the Paveleys who had this place here". Use of the badge descended to Cheney and then to Willoughby. William Camden stated of Cheney's descendant: "Lord Willoughby, by report Admiral, used the helme of a ship for the seal to his ring". A small rudder is sculpted on the alabaster monument and effigy of Robert Willoughby, 1st Baron Willoughby de Broke (died 1502) in Callington church in Cornwall. Two relief sculptures of rudders survive today in Edington church, and Aubrey noted in a chapel south of the chancel in Westbury Church "in one window some rudders of ships or". They were also formerly visible in Seend church.

=== Verney ===
While the title Baron Willoughby de Broke survives today, held by the Verney family formerly of Compton Verney in Warwickshire, the family's connection with Brook faded away in the 17th century. Brook Hall went into a long decline and for most of its subsequent history was a tenanted farm.

== 20th century ==
In 1968, three related buildings were recorded on the National Heritage List for England. The Early Wing, from the 15th century, was designated as Grade I while the adjoining farmhouse (c. 1600) and a barn (late 17th century) are Grade II.

For 20 years the Early Wing was listed on Historic England's Heritage at Risk Register. Following many years with shoring scaffolding for structural support following local authority statutory powers enforcement, following a change of ownership in 2014 the hall was subject to repairs in 2017/18 and was described as a success story for the register.

== Descriptions ==
=== Description by John Leland (1503-1552) ===
Brook House is described by the antiquarian John Leland (1503–1552), which text was commented on in an article called "Leland's Journey through Wiltshire" published in the Wiltshire Archaeological Magazine, 1883. Part of the old House of the Paveleys was visible when Leland visited. His description is as follows:

"There was of very aunciente tyme an olde maner place wher Brooke Hall is now, and parte of it yet appearithe, but the buyldynge that is there is of the erectynge of the Lorde Stewarde unto Kynge Henry the VII. The wyndowes be full of rudders. Peradventure it was his badge or token of the Amiraltye. There is a fayre parke, but no great large thynge. In it be a great nombar of very fair and fyne greyned okes apt to sele howses. The broke that renithe by Brooke is properly caulyd Bisse, and risethe at a place namyd Bismouth, a two myles above Brooke village, an hamlet longynge to Westbyry paroche. Thens it cummithe onto Brooke village, and so a myle lower onto Brooke Haule, levinge it hard on the right ripe, and about a two miles lower it goith to Trougbridge, and then into Avon"

=== Description by Aubrey (1626–1697) ===
The Antiquarian John Aubrey (1626–1697) visited Brook Hall and in his 1650 work on South Wiltshire wrote describing it as "a very great and stately old howse" with "a hall which is great and open, with very olde windowes". There was a "canopie chamber", a dining room, parlour and chapel, and the windows were filled with coats shewing the armorial descent of Willoughby, which he described. The windows "are most of them semée with rudder of a ship, or. He observes "the Rudder everywhere". This was the heraldic badge of Robert Willoughby, 1st Baron Willoughby de Broke, apparently inherited from Cheney, as it is shown also on the monument to Sir Ralph Cheyne (died 1400) of Brook, in Edington Priory Church. Aubrey wrote as follows, describing the coats of arms then visible in the stained glass windows of the Great Hall and the "Canopie Chamber":

"Brook House in Westbury parish is a very great and stately old howse. In the Hall, which is great and open, with very old windowes, remaines only the coate of Paveley: Azure a cross flory or (illustrated as plate xxxvii., No. 549). In the Canopie Chamber, in the windows:

==== Windows of Canopie Chamber ====
- [550] Sir (Humphrey) Stafford: Or, a chevron gules, and bordure engrailed sable, impaling for Elizabeth his wife, daughter and heir of Adam Greyvill, six lioncells rampant sable, 3, 2, 1. Field not coloured (for Greynville or Greyvile of Southwick Court) (Argent, six lions rampant gules is one of the coats of Greville).
- [551] (Sir Humphrey) Stafford, quartering Greyvill; impaling: Sable, a fret or, for Elizabeth daughter and heir of John Maltravers.
- [552] Sir John Maltravers, as before, impaling, for Elizabeth daughter and heir of (Robert) Cifrewast, Azure, 2 bars gemelles argent.
- [553] Sir John Maltravers quartering Cifrewast, both as before, Impaling, for Elizabeth daughter of Sir William (and coheir of her brother William) Aumarle or Almerle, Per fess Gules and Azure, 3 crescents argent.
- [554] Sir Edmund Cheyne, G(ules), on 4 lozenges in fess a(rgent), 4 escallops S(able), impaling Stafford quartering 1. Greyvill. 2. Maltravers. 3. Cifrewast: all as before.
- [555] Sir John Willoughby, S(able), a cross engrailed o(r)r; quartering, G(ules), a cross moline a(rgent) (Beke) with a crescent at fess point; Impaling, Cheyney quartering 1. Stafford 2. Greyvill. 3. Maltravers. 4. Cifrewast. 5. Aumarle : all as before".
- [No. 556] Robert Willoughby (Lord Broke): of 10 coats. 1. Willoughby and Beke quarterly. 2. Cheney. 3. Stafford. 4. Greyvill. 5. Maltravers. 6. Cifrewast. 7. Aumarle. 8. As 1 : all as before. The windows are most of them semee with a Rudder of a Ship.
- [No. 557] Willoughby Lord Brooke, tempore Edwardi III, gave the rudder of a ship or, for his cognizance (Vide Speed). Mem(orandum): in Hen. 7th's time Lord Willoughby of Broke was Admirall. Mr. Wadman would persuade me that this Rudder belonged to Paveley who had this place here.

==== Windows of Dining Room ====
- [No. 558] Willoughby quartering Beke, a crescent for difference; 2. Latimer. 3. Cheney. 4. Stafford. All as before.
- [559] France and England. King's Arms.
- [560] D(itt)o, within a bordure gobone A(rgent) and Az(ure), (Beaufort, Duke of Somerset). (See plate xxxviii)
- [561] France and England quarterly, impaling, 1. Quarterly, 1. Courtenay. 2 and 3. G. three fishes Or. 4. France (so drawn by Aubrey : but Q. France and England ?) 2 and 3. Mortimer. 4. O(r), a cross g(ules).
- [562] John, Lord Neville, impaling, G(ules), a cross patonce o(r), for Elizabeth, daughter and heir of William, Lord Latimer.
- [563] Sir (Thomas) Willoughby, quartering Beke: Impaling, Neville (all as before), for Elizabeth, daughter and coheir to Elizabeth Neville aforesaid.
- [564] Sir John Willoughby and Beke quarterly : quartering Latimer (all as before), impaling, for Johanna daughter and heir to Welby, S(able), 3 fleurs de lys A(rgent).
- [565] Willoughby, Beke, and Latimer; impaling Cheney: all as before.

==== Windows of the Parlour ====
- [567] The Sun in full glory with an eye in tears, a crest of Blount.

==== Windows of Chapel ====
- [571]
- [572]

=== Description by Sir Richard Colt Hoare, Bt. (1758–1838) ===
The Wiltshire historian Sir Richard Colt Hoare, 2nd Baronet (1758–1838) described Brook House in his work "Modern Wiltshire", concerning the hundred of Westbury.

=== Description by Edward Thomas (1878-1917) ===
The poet Edward Thomas (1878–1917) in his book In Pursuit of Spring, says this of Brook Hall (which he calls Brook House):

.... I reached the flat, rushy, and willowy green valley of the Biss. The road forded the brook and brought me up into the sloping courtyard of Brook House Farm. On the right was a high wall and a pile of rough cordwood against it; on the left a buttressed, ecclesiastical-looking building with tiers of windows and three doorways, some four or five centuries old; and before me, at the top of the yard, between the upper end of the high wall and the ecclesiastical-looking building, was the back of the farm-house, its brass pans gleaming. This is the remnant of Brook House. What is now a cowshed below, a cheese room above, has been the chapel of Brook House, formerly the seat of Paveleys, Joneses, and Cheneys. The brook below was once called Baron's brook on account of the barony conferred on the owner: the family of Willoughby de Broke are said to have taken their name from it. The cows made an excellent congregation, free from all the disadvantages of believing or wanting to believe in the immortality of the soul, in the lower half of the old chapel; the upper floor and its shelves of Cheddar cheeses of all sizes could not offend the most jealous deity or his most jealous worshippers. The high, intricate rafter-work of the tiled roof was open, and the timber, as pale as if newly scrubbed, was free from cobwebs — in fact, chestnut wood is said to forbid cobwebs. Against the wall leaned long boards bearing the round stains of bygone cheeses. Every one who could write had carved his name on the stone. Instead of windows there were three doors in the side away from the quadrangle, as if at one time they had been entered either from a contiguous building or by a staircase from beneath. Evidently both the upper and the lower chambers were formerly subdivided into cells of some kind.

The farm-house is presumably the remnant of the old manor house, cool and still, looking out away from the quadrangle over a garden containing a broad, rough-hewn stone disinterred hereby, and a green field corrugated in parallelograms betokening old walls or an encampment. The field next to this is spoken of as a churchyard, but there seems to be no record of skeletons found there. Half a mile off in different directions are Cutteridge, Hawkeridge, and Storridge, but nothing nearer in that narrow, gentle valley. . . .

=== Description by Michael Ford ===
Michael Ford says of Brook Hall:

The hall is situated at the end of a minor road which goes right up to the buildings, through a shallow ford. The building range in front of the 17c farmhouse is an early 16c lodging, 'Brook Hall', of two storeys and built of stone. It was used to accommodate guests and retainers and had stabling below with chambers above. This is Wiltshire's best example of a medieval lodging. It will hopefully be repaired and preserved in the near future now that the Wiltshire Historic Buildings Trust has taken over its management. They are looking for a partner to purchase the building, after completion of the work, for one of a variety of possible uses.

== Sources ==
- Aubrey, John. The Topographical Collections of John Aubrey AD 1659–70 with Illustrations, Corrected and Enlarged by John Edward Jackson, published by Wiltshire Archaeological and Natural History Society, Devizes, 1862, pp. 399–402, Brook House
- Hamilton Rogers, W.H., The Strife of the Roses & Days of the Tudors in the West, Exeter, 1890, "Our Steward of Household", Robert, Lord Willoughby de Broke, K.G., pp. 1–37 on-line text, freefictionbooks on-line text, with images, Project Gutenburg
- Pevsner, Nikolaus; Cherry, Bridget (revision) (1975) [1963]. Wiltshire. The Buildings of England (2nd ed.). Harmondsworth: Penguin Books. p. 474. ISBN 978-0-14-0710-26-7.
