= Gorges, Manche =

Gorges
- Commune
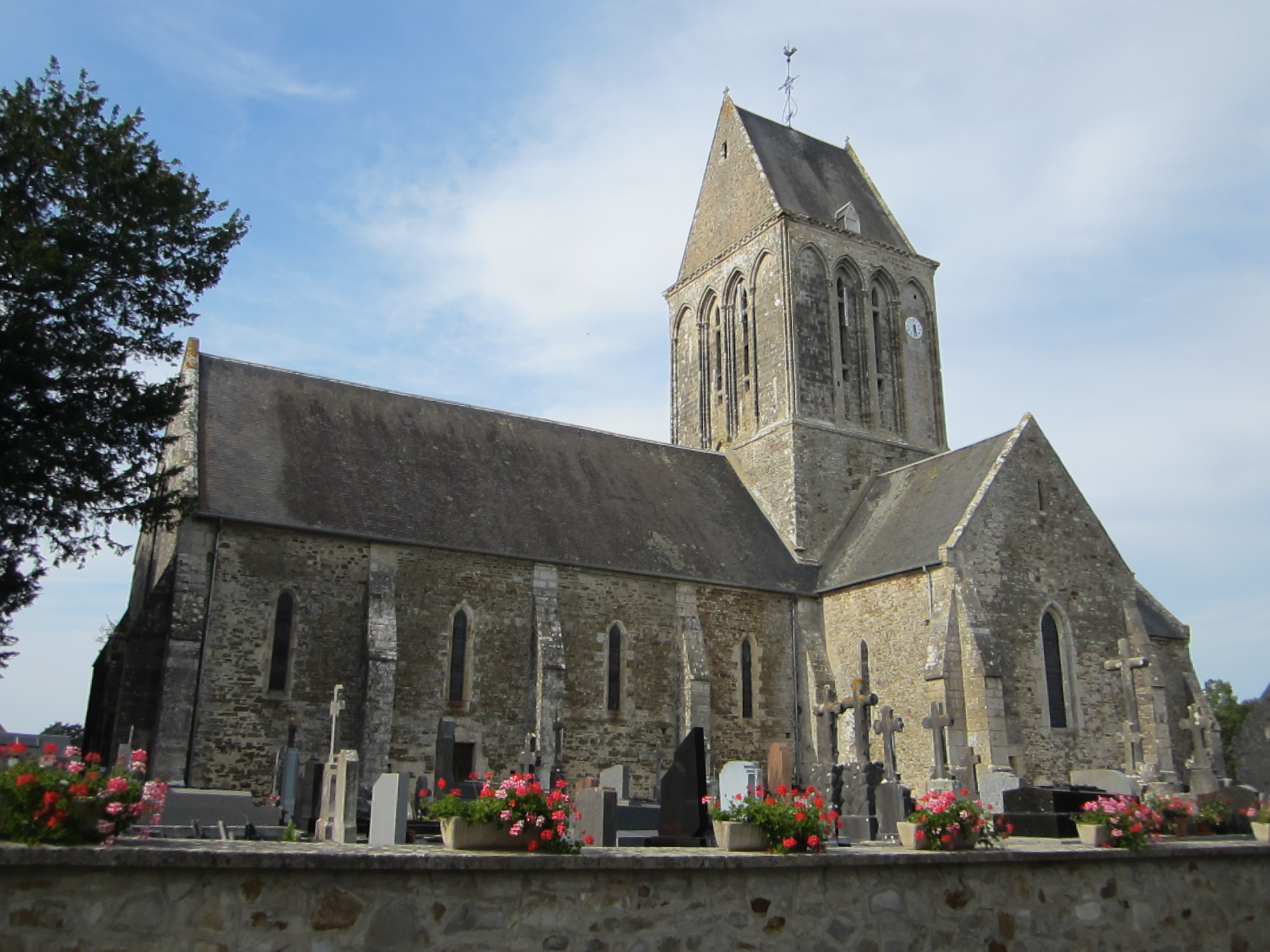
- The church of Notre-Dame
- Location of Gorges
- Location within France Location within Normandy
- Coordinates: 49°15′26″N 1°24′20″W
- Country: France
- Region: Normandy
- Department: Manche
- Arrondissement: Coutances
- Canton: Agon-Coutainville

Government
  - Mayor (2020–2026): David Cervantes
- Area^{1}: 22.67 km^{2} (8.75 sq mi)
- Elevation: 15 m (49 ft)
- Highest elevation: 38 m (125 ft)
- Lowest elevation: 1 m (3.3 ft)
- Population (2023): 350
  - Density: 15/km^{2} (40/sq mi)
- Time zone: UTC+01:00 (CET)
  - Summer (DST): UTC+02:00 (CEST)
- INSEE/Postal code: 50210 /50190
- ^{1} French Land Register data, which excludes lakes, ponds, glaciers > 1 km^{2} (0.386 sq mi or 247 acres) and river estuaries.

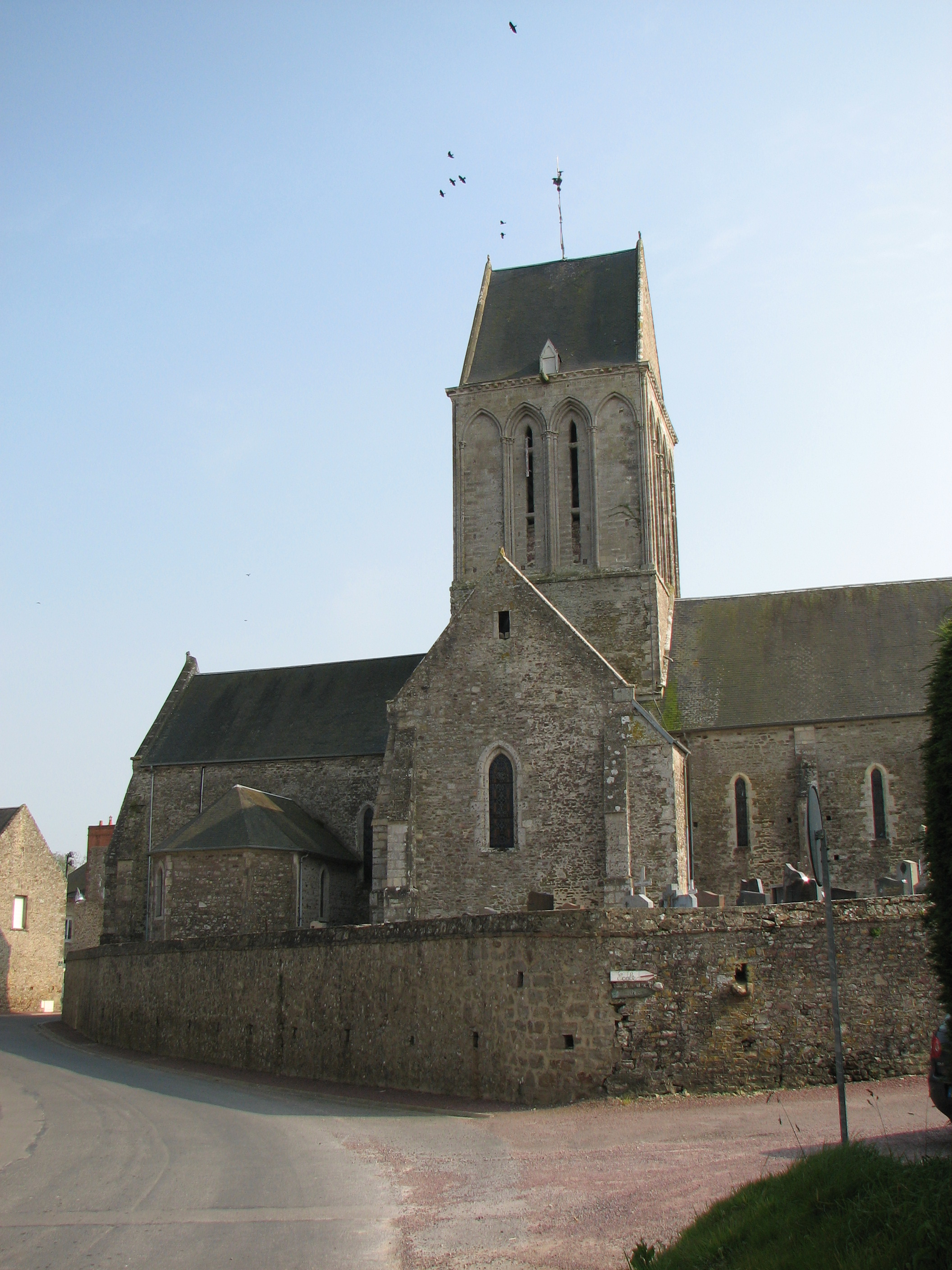
Gorges church

Gorges (French pronunciation: [ɡɔʁʒ]) is a commune in the Manche department in north-western France.

== See also ==
- The Anglo-Norman Gorges family has its origins in Gorges, Manche.
- Communes of the Manche department
