= Baron Gorges =

Medieval English peerage

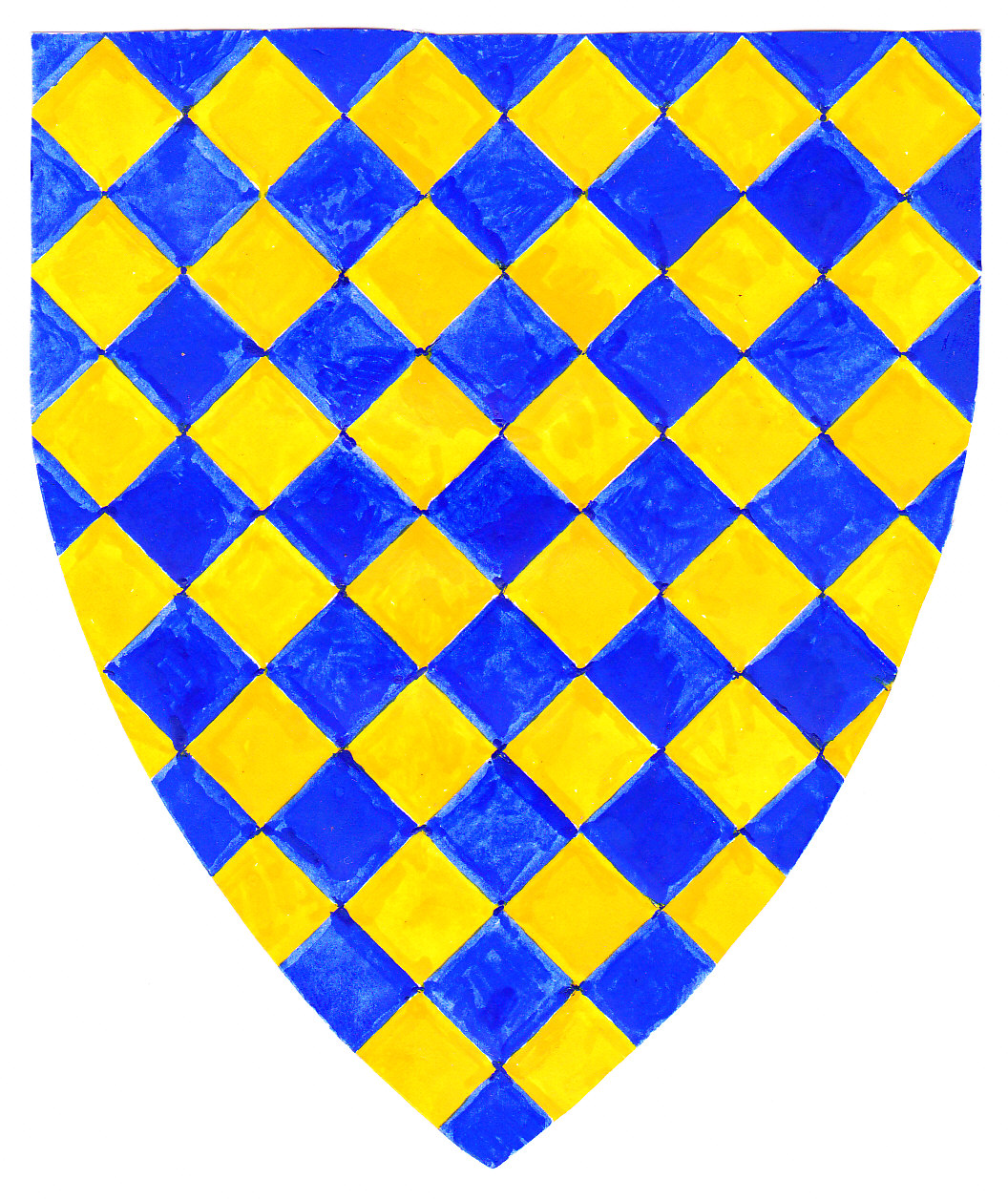
Arms of 1st Baron Gorges: lozengy or and azure

Baron Gorges was a title created in the Peerage of England for the soldier Sir Ralph Gorges (died 1323), of Wraxall in Somerset, who was summoned to Parliament as a baron in 1309. On the death of his son without children in 1344, any hereditary title expired.

== Barons Gorges (1309) ==
Sir Ralph Gorges (about 1284-1323), 1st Baron Gorges, in about 1301 married Eleanor, whose parents are unknown. After his death she married Sir John Peachey. They had four children:

- Ralph Gorges (1308-1344), 2nd Baron Gorges, only son and heir. About 1330 he married Elizabeth but died without children, so his title expired.
- Elizabeth Gorges (born about 1302), who married Sir Robert Ashton. She inherited the Gorges manors of Bradpole and Litton but died without surviving children.
- Eleanor Gorges (born about 1304), who married Sir Theobald Russell (died 1341), of Kingston Russell, son of Sir William Russell. She inherited the Gorges manors of Wraxall and Knighton, passing Wraxall to her younger son Theobald Russell (died 1380), later knighted, who adopted the surname and arms of Gorges and so continued the family line.
- Joan Gorges (born about 1306), who inherited the Gorges manor of Tothill and married (as his second wife) Sir William Cheyne (died 1345). They had a son and heir, Sir Ralph Cheyne (1337-1400).

== See also ==
- Gorges family
- Baron Gorges of Dundalk
- Gorges, Raymond & Brown, Frederick, Rev., FSA. The Story of a Family through Eleven Centuries, Illustrated by Portraits and Pedigrees: Being a History of the Family of Gorges, Boston, USA, Merrymount Press privately published, 1944. RG was also editor of The letters of Thomas Gorges, Deputy Governor of the Province of Maine, 1640-1643, Boston, 1928)
