= Bradpole =

Village in Dorset, England

Coordinates: 50.7455°N 2.7382°W

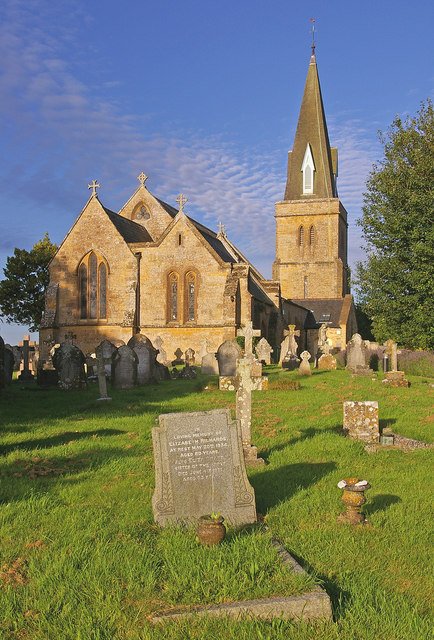
- Holy Trinity Church, Bradpole

- Location within Dorset
- Population: 2,339
- OS grid reference: SY480942
- Civil parish: Bridport
- Unitary authority: Dorset
- Ceremonial county: Dorset
- Region: South West
- Country: England
- Sovereign state: United Kingdom
- Post town: BRIDPORT
- Postcode district: DT6
- Dialling code: 01308
- Police: Dorset
- Fire: Dorset and Wiltshire
- Ambulance: South Western
- UK Parliament: West Dorset

Bradpole is a village in the civil parish of Bridport, in south west Dorset, England, in the Brit valley, 1 mile (1.6 km) outside Bridport. In the 2011 census the population of the parish was 2,339.

In 1651 Charles II passed through Bradpole in his efforts to evade capture after he failed to sail to France from Charmouth following his defeat at the Battle of Worcester. An inscribed stone in the south of the parish, where Lee Lane meets the A35 trunk road between Bridport and Dorchester, marks the place where he took a turning off the main road to escape from his pursuers.

Bradpole is the birthplace of industrialist and Liberal Party politician William Edward Forster (1818–1886), who was instrumental in bringing through the 1870 Elementary Education Act. He is commemorated by the village Memorial Hall.

The parish church was built in 1845, following two previous buildings on the same site. Its communion cup dates from the 16th century. A chapel of ease, St Andrew's, was built in 1858-60 and is now redundant.

The civil parish and parish council were abolished with effect from 1 April 2024, with the parish area taken into Bridport, part also went to Symondsbury.
