= Church of St Mary and St Edward, Barrow Gurney =

Church in Somerset, England

Church of St Mary and St Edward
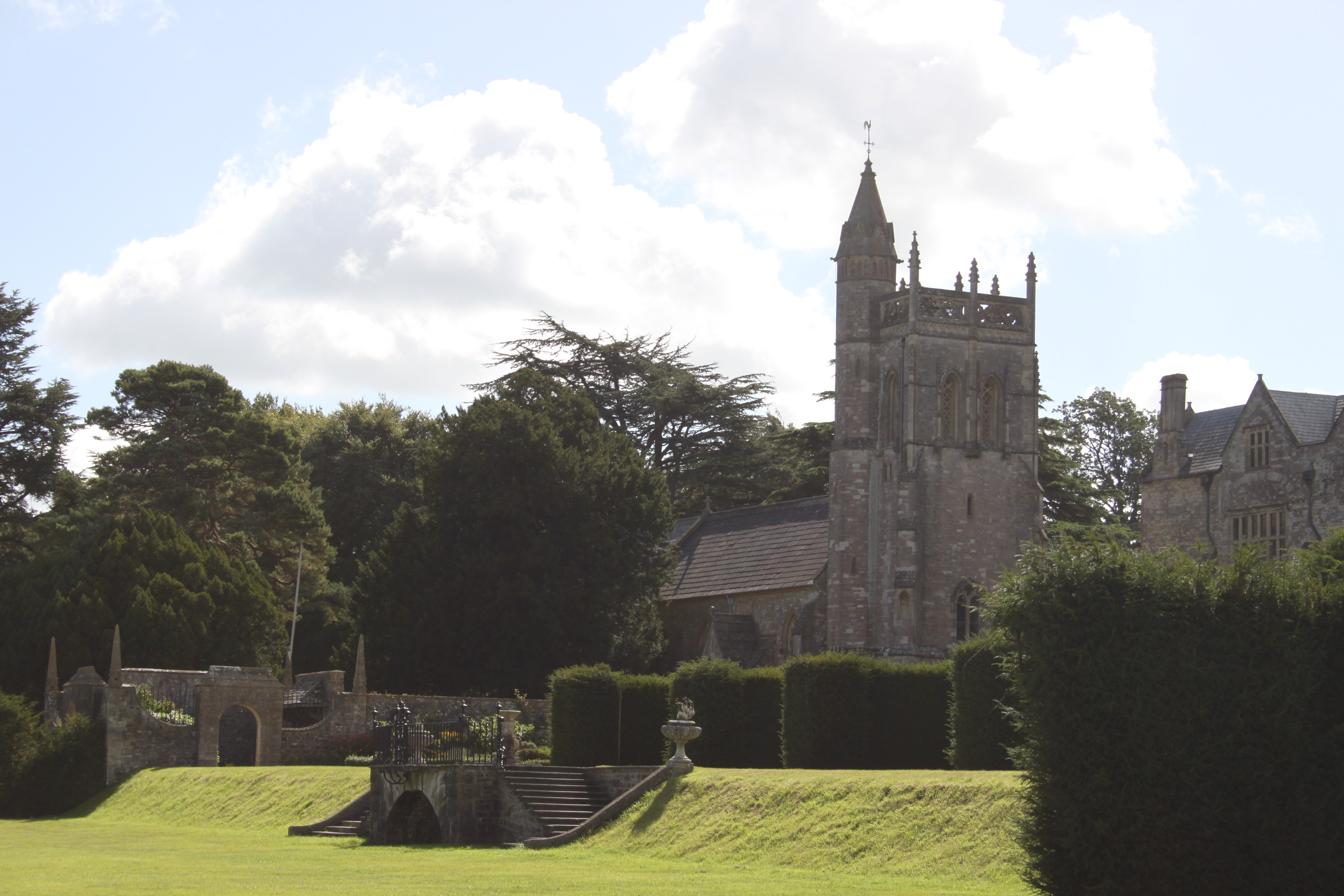

- Location within Somerset
- 51°24′47″N 2°41′58″W
- Location: Barrow Gurney, Somerset, England

History
- Built: 12th century

Listed Building – Grade II*
- Designated: 11 October 1961
- Reference no.: 1311925

The Church of St Mary and St Edward is an Anglican parish church in Barrow Gurney, Somerset, England. It was built in the 12th century, but largely rebuilt in the 1880s, and has been designated as a Grade II* listed building.

The church was originally connected to the neighbouring Barrow Gurney Nunnery which became Barrow Court. It was originally built in the 12th century but was virtually rebuilt by Henry Woodyer 1887–90 for Henry Martin Gibbs son of William Gibbs of Tyntesfield.

It has a three-stage west tower surmounted by pinnacles and a spirelet. There is a two bay chancel, with a Cosmati work floor and four bay nave.

In 2013 an appeal was made for funds to help make repairs to the church including redecoration and servicing of the organ, which was largely unchanged since its construction by Vowles of Bristol around 1890.

The parish is part of the benefice of Long Ashton with Barrow Gurney and Flax Bourton within the deanery of Portishead, and the archdeaconry of Bath.

== See also ==
- List of ecclesiastical parishes in the Diocese of Bath and Wells
