= Wraxall Court =

Building in Wraxall, Somerset, England

- Location within Somerset
- 51.4455°N 2.7359°W
- Location: Wraxall, Somerset, England

History
- Built: 1658
- Built for: Simon Gorges
- Rebuilt: c. 1720

Site notes
- Restored: 1912
- Restored by: T. Ruddington Davey

Listed Building – Grade II
- Official name: Wraxall Court
- Designated: 16 March 1984
- Reference no.: 1158077

Wraxall Court (originally called Wraxall Lodge) is a historic building in Wraxall in the English county of Somerset. It is a Grade II listed building.

Parts of the original 1658 building were incorporated into the current building when it was erected around 1720 after which it was used by the families of John Codrington and Richard Bampfylde. The house was extended in the 19th century by Thomas Upton. Modernisation including the provision of a water supply was undertaken in the early 20th century. During World War II the house was used as a convalescent home by the Admiralty and then as residences by the University of Bristol before returning to use as a private house.

The house reflects the many changes and styles of architecture covering the last 300 years and is surrounded by gardens and an estate which includes specimen trees.

== History ==
The house was originally built in 1658 and extensively remodelled in 1720 with further restoration and expansion in 1912. The 17th century house was built, near the church, for Simon Gorges, a descendant of Ferdinando Gorges. In the early 18th century that house was demolished and parts of it, including the porch, incorporated into the current building. Gorges descendant John Codrington, a local member of parliament further developed the house and estate in the 1720s and 1730s. His daughter married Richard Bampfylde and the handed down to their family including Charles Bampfylde. He became bankrupt and in 1800 the Wraxall estate was sold at auction for £28,500 to Philip Prothero of Over, Gloucestershire, however it was eventually purchased by Sir John Hugh Smyth of Ashton Court and used by members of his family. Thomas Upton, who married Florence Smyth, owned the house and, in 1830 he added the flanking wings to the house and created the staircase. Much of the interior decoration of the house dates from this time.

For the rest of the 19th century the house was occupied by tenants, including Henry Hallam, until 1911 when it was sold by Lady Smyth to T. Rudding Davey who had the house connected to the mains water supply and installed the plumbing system. He also replaced the ceiling of the study. He died in 1939 but his wife continued to live in the house. In the 1940s the house was used as a convalescent home by the admiralty in conjunction with Barrow Court. In the immediate post World War II period it became residences for students from the University of Bristol. The next owner was Mr T. Lucas who bought it from Major R.E. Davey in 1953.

== Architecture ==
The two-storey stone house has slate hipped roofs with a parapet. The nine bay front of the house has a central porch at the doorway which has ionic columns supporting a frieze and moulded cornice. From the door the entrance hall goes from south to north and meets an inner hall running east to west with the staircase with wooden balustrade. The drawing room occupies the west bay of the south front and is decorated with palmette designs in a frieze which is typical of early 19th century decorative schemes.

The garden has a walled areas, lawns and specimen trees many of which have been planted since 1953.

== Bibliography ==
- Cooke, Robert (1957). West Country Houses. Batsford.
