= Jake Polledri =

Italian rugby union player (born 1995)

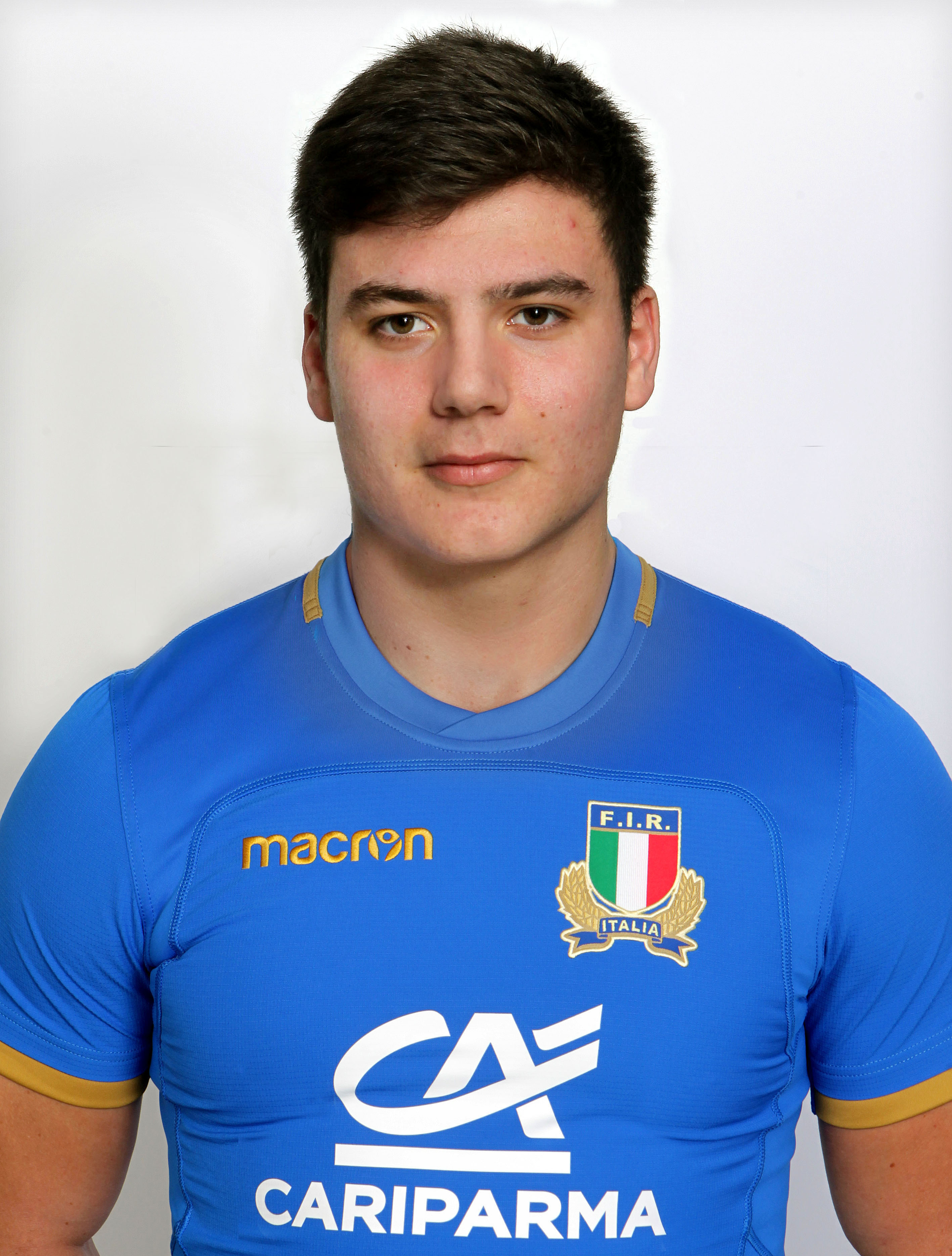
- Polledri in 2017
- Born: Jake Polledri; 8 November 1995 (age 31) Bristol, England
- Height: 1.88 m (6 ft 2 in)
- Weight: 106 kg (16 st 10 lb; 234 lb)
- School: Downs Preparatory School; Colston's School; Hartpury College

Rugby union career
- Position(s): Flanker, No.8
Senior career
Years	Team	Apps	(Points)
2015−2017	Hartpury University		
2017–2023	Gloucester	69	(50)
2022	→Hartpury University	1	(0)
2023−2024	Zebre Parma	2	(0)
- Correct as of 9 December 2023
International career
Years	Team	Apps	(Points)
2014–2015	Italy U20s	9	(5)
2018–2023	Italy	20	(20)
- Correct as of 12 February 2023

Jake Polledri (born 8 November 1995) is an English-born Italian rugby union retired player. He played for the Italy national rugby union team in 20 occasions with 4 tries.

== Early life ==
Polledri is the son of Peter Polledri, who represented Bristol and captained England Under-23. He had a younger brother, who died in March 2022. He attended The Downs Preparatory School, Bristol until the age of 13. Whilst at The Downs Polledri was a member of the 2009 National Schools 7's winning side, beating Bedford School to become National Champions. After leaving The Downs Preparatory School in 2009, Polledri enrolled at Colston's School, Bristol. Afterwards Polledri moved to Filton College, Bristol. He represented Filton College and Dings Crusaders, in addition to turning out in the Aviva Premiership A League for Bristol Rugby since 2014. He played junior rugby for St Mary's Old Boys.

== Club career ==
He then joined Hartpury RFC during the 2015–16 season where at senior level, during the 2016–17 season, he had a breakthrough campaign as he has played his part in a season for the leaders in National League 1, where he helped them earn promotion to the RFU Championship.

On 2 March 2017, Polledri signed his first professional contract with Gloucester Rugby in Premiership Rugby; a three-year deal ahead of the 2017–18 season. In December 2017, he was awarded Try of the week for his try in Round 10 against London Irish. He also won Gloucester Rugby's Young Player of the Season Award for the 2017–18 season and the Player of the Season for the 2019–20 season.

After suffering a knee ligament injury that led Polledri out of action for nearly 18 months, he has signed a contract extension to stay with Gloucester for the 2022–23 season.

In March 2023, Gloucester Rugby confirmed that Polledri would depart the club at the end of the 2023–24 season to join Zebre. He made his debut in Round 1 of the 2023–24 season of EPCR Challenge Cup against the Cheetahs. He played with Zebre until March 2024.

== International career ==
Polledri qualified for Italy through Italian grandparents and represented Italy U20s during the 2014 IRB Junior World Championship.

On 17 March 2018, Polledri made his international debut for Italy, losing 27–29 against Scotland in their final match of the 2018 Six Nations Championship. On 16 June 2018, Polledri scored his first international try for Italy in a game against Japan which the Italians won 25–22.
