= Land Yeo =

River in north Somerset, England

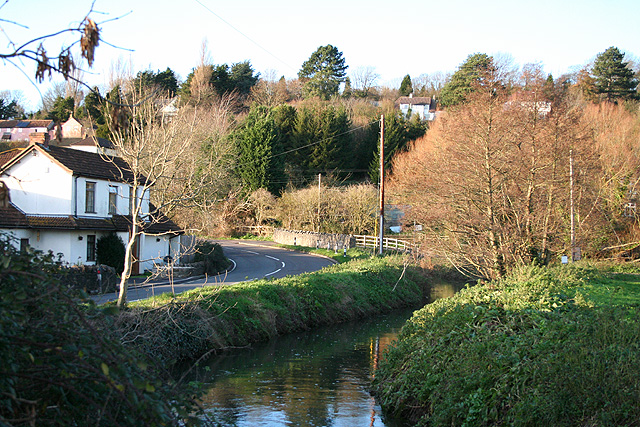
- The Land Yeo by Jacklands Bridge, Nailsea

Location
- Country: England
- County: North Somerset
- Cities: Barrow Gurney, Nailsea, Wraxall, Somerset, Tickenham, Clevedon

Physical characteristics
- Source
  - location: Dundry Hill, Somerset, England
  - coordinates: 51°23′56″N 2°39′06″W
- Mouth: Severn Estuary
  - location: Clevedon, Somerset, England
  - coordinates: 51°25′42″N 2°52′33″W
  - elevation: 0 ft (0 m)

The Land Yeo is a small river which flows through North Somerset, England. It rises on Dundry Hill and supplies Barrow Gurney Reservoirs before flowing through various villages to Clevedon where it drains into the Severn Estuary. During the past 1,000 years it has powered at least ten watermills; however, only one is still functional. Since 2003 initiatives have been undertaken to clean up the river, improving water quality and encouraging wildlife.

== River course ==
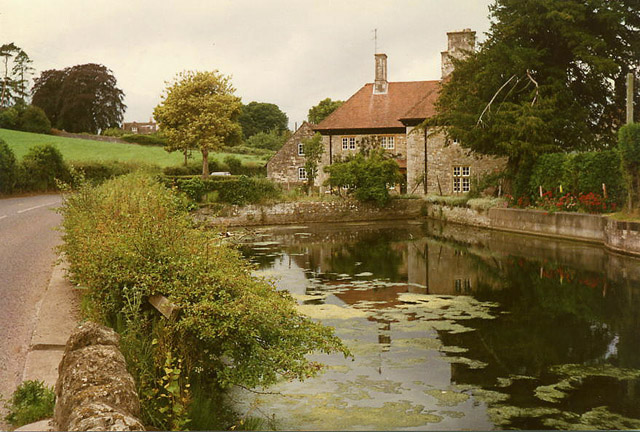
Millpond at Barrow Gurney

The Land Yeo has its origins at several small springs on the western edge of Dundry Hill. It is one of the small streams which feed Barrow Gurney Reservoirs near the village of Barrow Gurney, which provide drinking water for Bristol. It flows through the village of Barrow Gurney alongside the B3130 road, where it can be seen in millponds controlled by sluices.

It flows north beneath the A370 road and the Bristol to Exeter railway line close to an old Roman settlement at Gatcombe. The weir at Watercress Farm marks the start of the formal statutory main river designation of the Land Yeo. Flowing west past the Tyntesfield Estate it has been diverted north and embanked into higher ground around what is now the Barn Public House. The original much smaller channel is still fed via a sluice through the water meadows. The Land Yeo continues to the north of Nailsea where it is crossed by Jacklands Bridge and south of Wraxall, continuing through a man-made channel, past Tickenham where it is the northern boundary of the Tickenham, Nailsea and Kenn Moors SSSI.

It then passes under the M5 motorway, through Clevedon where it joins the Middle Yeo and drains at low tide through the tidal sluice into the Severn Estuary.

== Mills ==
During the 18th and 19th centuries the Land Yeo powered a series of mills, with some dating back to the time of the Domesday Book. These included corn and gristmills and those adapted for the production of snuff.

There were three mills on the Land Yeo in Barrow Gurney. The Upper Barrow Mill, which had an Overshot water wheel, was a Gristmill which is known to have been operating in 1839. By 1866 it was running as a corn mill, and ceased operation by 1935. The Middle Mill was converted to snuff manufacture by Peter Lilly a tobacconist from Bristol around 1800 and became part of the W.D. & H.O. Wills tobacco manufacturing company. It ceased mill operations by 1839 and by 1885 both the leat and millpond had disappeared. The Lower Mill is known have been grinding corn in the 19th century. It was rebuilt in 1909 when an iron overshot watermill of 14 feet (4.3 m) diameter was installed and steam power introduced. The mill is still used to produce animal feeds, however the waterwheel and millpond, which remain, are no longer in use.

The next mill downstream is in the parish of Long Ashton close to the site of the Gatcombe Roman Settlement. There is evidence of a snuff mill at the site in 1769, however the current building dates from the early 19th century. By 1846 it had been converted to grind mustard, annatto and drugs, but by 1874 was a flour mill. The internal machinery is still in place and the mill has been designated as a Grade II listed building. In the same parish stood Kincott Mill which had stood since at least the 13th century. By the early 19th century rented out for snuff grinding and in the 1830s a steam engine was installed to power a flour and corn mill. Later it was owned by an iron founder, who made edge tools and other farm implements and installed cast-iron water wheels.

To the north of the village of Flax Bourton are the remains of Bourton Mill which may have existed at the time of the Domesday Book and strong documentary evidence exists from 1769. Between 1839 and 1885 the river was diverted into the tailrace of the mill, eliminating a bend in the river. All that remains of the three-storey mill is a single storey garage of a private house.

At Watercress Farm, Wraxall is the only waterwheel still operating on the river. The 6-foot-diameter (1.8 m) wheel, which was built before 1885 and is housed in a small brick building, is used as a water pump. The other mill in the parish of Wraxall operated in the 18th and 19th centuries. It fell out of use by 1885 and was ruined by 1950. The only remains are crumbling walls by the entrance to Wraxall House.

The mill at Tickenham was established in the middle of the 12th century by canons of the Abbey of St Augustine, (now Bristol Cathedral). In the 19th century it was owned by the Ashton Court Estate and in the 20th century was used as a water pump. It has now been converted into a private house.

There were at least two mills at Clevedon. The Tuck Mills lay in the fields south of Clevedon Court and were used for fulling cloth. The other mills were near Wain's Hill and probably date from the early 17th century.

== Restoration ==
In 2003 a group known as the Friends of the Land Yeo was set up to maintain and enhance the river, including the removal of debris. The subsequent improvements in water quality have increased the numbers of fish and improved the river as a habitat for birds and mammals including kingfishers, little egrets, herons, swans and otters. The group have also been developing a series of river walks. A grant, in 2011, of £200,000 to fund work on the wetlands of the North Somerset Levels will enable further work to enhance biodiversity to be undertaken.
