= Andrée Peel =

French resistance fighter

- Born: Andrée Marthe Virot; 3 February 1905
- Died: 5 March 2010 (aged 105); Long Ashton, United Kingdom
- Other names: Agent Rose
- Organization: French Resistance

Andrée Peel (3 February 1905 – 5 March 2010), born Andrée Marthe Virot, was a French-British member of the French Resistance against Nazi Germany's occupation of France during World War II. She was known as Agent Rose, a code name shared with Eileen Nearne.

== Early life ==
Peel was born as Andrée Marthe Virot in February 1905. Little is known about her childhood. When World War II broke out in September 1939, she was running a beauty salon in the Breton port of Brest, France.

== World War II ==
After the German invasion, she joined the resistance and was involved in distributing secret newspapers, but was later appointed head of an under-section of the resistance. She and her team used torches to guide Allied planes to improvised landing strips, and helped Allied airmen who had landed in occupied France to escape onto submarines and gunboats, saving the lives of more than one hundred soldiers and airmen.

She was arrested in Paris in 1944 and sent to the Ravensbrück concentration camp. She was later transferred to the concentration camp at Buchenwald where she was being lined up to be shot by firing squad when the US Army arrived to liberate the prisoners. During this time, she also survived meningitis.

== After the war ==
After the war, she met her future husband, an English student named John Peel who later became an academic neuropsychologist, while working in a restaurant in Paris, and they settled in Long Ashton, near Bristol, several years later. The couple had no children. While living in Long Ashton, Andrée received many visits from admirers and also managed to relieve the pain of visitors who had injuries.

== Awards ==
Mrs. Peel received many decorations from the French government for her resistance work, and she was awarded the Order of Liberation by France, the Medal of Freedom by the United States, and the King's Commendation for Brave Conduct by Britain. During the war she received a personal letter of appreciation from Prime Minister Winston Churchill.

She was presented with the Medal of Freedom by President Eisenhower.

She received the Légion d'honneur from her brother, four-star General Maurice Virot, in 2004. On 3 February 2005, she received a note from the Queen as she had just turned 100 years old. In 2010, she fractured her hip after a bad fall and had to undergo surgery. She died peacefully at the Lampton House nursing home on 5 March 2010.

Woodspring MP Liam Fox paid tribute to Mrs Peel, saying: "Mrs Peel was an iconic figure who showed phenomenal courage in the most difficult circumstances. Her selfless bravery saved many lives and she stands as a monument to the triumph of the human spirit, which will set an example for many generations to come."

Her house was broken into sometime on 10 or 11 March 2010, and several items were stolen, including copies of her autobiography. Police suspect that it was because of the widespread knowledge of her death after reporting in local and national newspapers.

In 2011, a parcel of land west of Keeds Lane in Long Ashton was proposed for a public park in her memory and named Andrée Peel Park.

== Autobiography ==
Her autobiography, Miracles Do Happen, ISBN 978-1874316374, was published in French as Miracles Existent!, ISBN 1-874316-46-5 (English version translated by Evelyn Scott Brown). It has been made into a film by William Ennals.

== Decorations ==
- Medal of Freedom
- Medal of the Resistance
- Ordre de la Libération
- Knight of the Légion d'honneur in 1967, promoted to Officer in 2004
- King's Commendation for Brave Conduct
- Croix de Guerre (with palm)

== See also ==
- French Resistance
