= Hundred of Hartcliffe =

Historical Hundred of Somerset, England

Hartcliffe Hundred
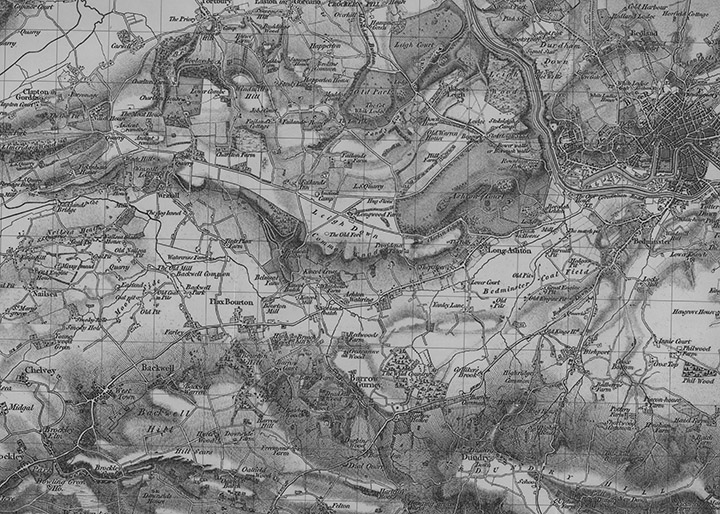
- 1815 Ordnance Survey map of the area
- Area
- 19,440 acres (7,870 ha)
- History
  - Created: unknown
- Status: Hundred
- Subdivisions
  - Type: Parishes
  - Units: Long Ashton, Backwell, Barrow Gurney, Bedminster, Butcombe, Chelvey, and Winford

The Hundred of Hartcliffe is one of the 40 historical hundreds in the ceremonial county of Somerset, England, dating from before the Norman conquest during the Anglo-Saxon era although exact dates are unknown. Each hundred had a 'fyrd', which acted as the local defence force and a court which was responsible for the maintenance of the frankpledge system. They also formed a unit for the collection of taxes. The role of the hundred court was described in the Dooms (laws) of King Edgar. The name of the hundred was normally that of its meeting-place.

At one time it was called Hartcliffe With Bedminster Hundred. Bedminster was previously a separate hundred after 1086 having been called Betmenistra and Bedmynstra before changing to its current name. The Hartcliffe Hundred also included Knowle West. It consisted of the ancient parishes of: Long Ashton, Backwell, Barrow Gurney, Bedminster, Butcombe, Chelvey, and Winford. It covered an area of 19,440 acres (7,870 ha).

The importance of the hundred courts declined from the seventeenth century. By the 19th century several different single-purpose subdivisions of counties, such as poor law unions, sanitary districts, and highway districts sprang up, filling the administrative role previously played by parishes and hundreds. Although the hundreds have never been formally abolished, their functions ended with the establishment of county courts in 1867 and the introduction of districts by the Local Government Act 1894.
