= Barrow Gurney =

Village in Somerset, England

Coordinates: 51.4045°N 2.6678°W

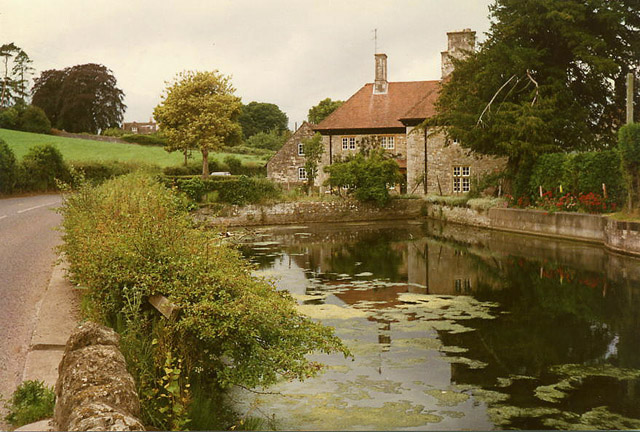
- Millpond on the Land Yeo at Lower Barrow Mill

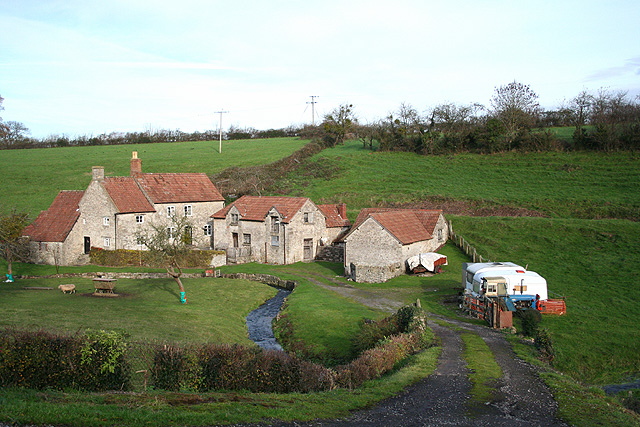
- Upper Barrow Mill

- Location within Somerset
- Population: 485 (2021 census)
- OS grid reference: ST535675
- Unitary authority: North Somerset
- Ceremonial county: Somerset
- Region: South West
- Country: England
- Sovereign state: United Kingdom
- Post town: Bristol
- Postcode district: BS48
- Dialling code: 01275
- Police: Avon and Somerset
- Fire: Avon
- Ambulance: South Western
- UK Parliament: North Somerset

Barrow Gurney is a village and civil parish in Somerset, England, situated in the unitary authority of North Somerset on the B3130 road, midway between the A38 and A370 near the Long Ashton bypass and Bristol Airport, 5 miles (8.0 km) south west of Bristol city centre. The civil parish includes Barrow Common and has a population of 485.

It is close to the Barrow Gurney Reservoirs, which supply drinking water for Bristol and feed the Land Yeo river which runs alongside the B3130 through the village. It was also the site of Barrow Hospital.

== History ==
The Domesday Book of 1086 records that Barrow Gurney was held by Nigel de Gournay, who would have won his lands in Englishcombe, Twerton, Swainswick and Barrow Gurney by fighting for William I of England. His original home must have been Gournay, which was half-way between Dieppe and Paris.

The parish was part of the hundred of Hartcliffe.

The Benedictine Barrow Gurney Nunnery was established here about the commencement of the 13th century by one of the Fitz-Hardinges (or Fitzhardinge).

Thomas de Gournay was involved with the murder of Edward II at Berkeley Castle in 1327.

There were three mills on the Land Yeo in Barrow Gurney. The Upper Barrow Mill, which had an overshot water wheel, was a Gristmill which is known to have been operating in 1839. By 1866 it was running as a corn mill, and ceased operation by 1935. The Middle Mill was converted to snuff manufacture by Peter Lilly a tobacconist from Bristol around 1800 and became part of the W.D. & H.O. Wills tobacco manufacturing company. It ceased mill operations by 1839 and by 1885 both the leat and millpond had disappeared. The Lower Mill is known have been grinding corn in the 19th century. It was rebuilt in 1909 when an iron overshot watermill of 14 feet (4.3 m) diameter was installed and steam power introduced. The mill is still used to produce animal feeds, however the waterwheel and millpond, which remain, are no longer in use.

Barrow Hospital (sometimes referred to as Barrow Gurney Hospital) was a psychiatric hospital which opened in the 1930s. In Second World War the hospital was commandeered by the Royal Navy and became a Royal Naval Auxiliary Hospital before being transferred to the National Health Service in 1948. In 2003 the Avon and Wiltshire Mental Health Partnership NHS Trust announced its intention to close Barrow Hospital by 2008. In 2008 planning permission was granted build 18 luxury homes and 405,000sq ft of office space on the southern part of the site. In 2010, plans were amended to include a 220-bed care home 'village' on the northern part of the site, more housing and fewer offices.

== Governance ==
The parish council has responsibility for local issues.

The parish falls within the unitary authority of North Somerset which was created in 1996, as established by the Local Government Act 1992. It provides a single tier of local government with responsibility for almost all local government functions within its area, Fire, police and ambulance services are provided jointly with other authorities through the Avon Fire and Rescue Service, Avon and Somerset Constabulary and the South Western Ambulance Service.

North Somerset's area covers part of the ceremonial county of Somerset but it is administered independently of the non-metropolitan county. From 1894 until 1974, Barrow Gurney was in Long Ashton Rural District; it was then in the Woodspring district of the county of Avon until 1996, when North Somerset district was created.

The parish is represented in the House of Commons of the Parliament of the United Kingdom as part of the North Somerset constituency.

== Demographics ==
Census population of Barrow Gurney parish
Census	Population	Female	Male	Households	Source
2001	374	195	179	138	
2011	349	180	169	139	
2021	485	236	249	177	

== Religious sites ==
The parish Church of St Mary and St Edward and Barrow Court manor house chapel have 12th-century origins but were virtually rebuilt by Henry Woodyer 1887–90 for Henry Martin Gibbs son of William Gibbs of Tyntesfield. It has been designated as a grade II* listed building.

== Culture ==
It is mentioned in the song 'Drink up thy Zider' by The Wurzels – the reference is to going to see his brother Ernie in the Barrow Hospital.

Barrow Gurney Cricket Club was founded in 1874 and moved to its current site in Hobbs Lane in the 1950s, recent improvements to the pavilion and grounds have made it widely considered as one of the most attractive places in play cricket in North Somerset. The club currently has 2 adult teams playing in the Bristol & District League and a Midweek team playing in the Bristol Midweek League. All teams are open to male and female players.

It is well known in the Bristol area as a shortcut to Bristol Airport, despite very narrow roads and heavy traffic calming measures that are clearly intended to discourage this.
