= Nailsea =

Town in North Somerset, England

Coordinates: 51.43°N 2.76°W

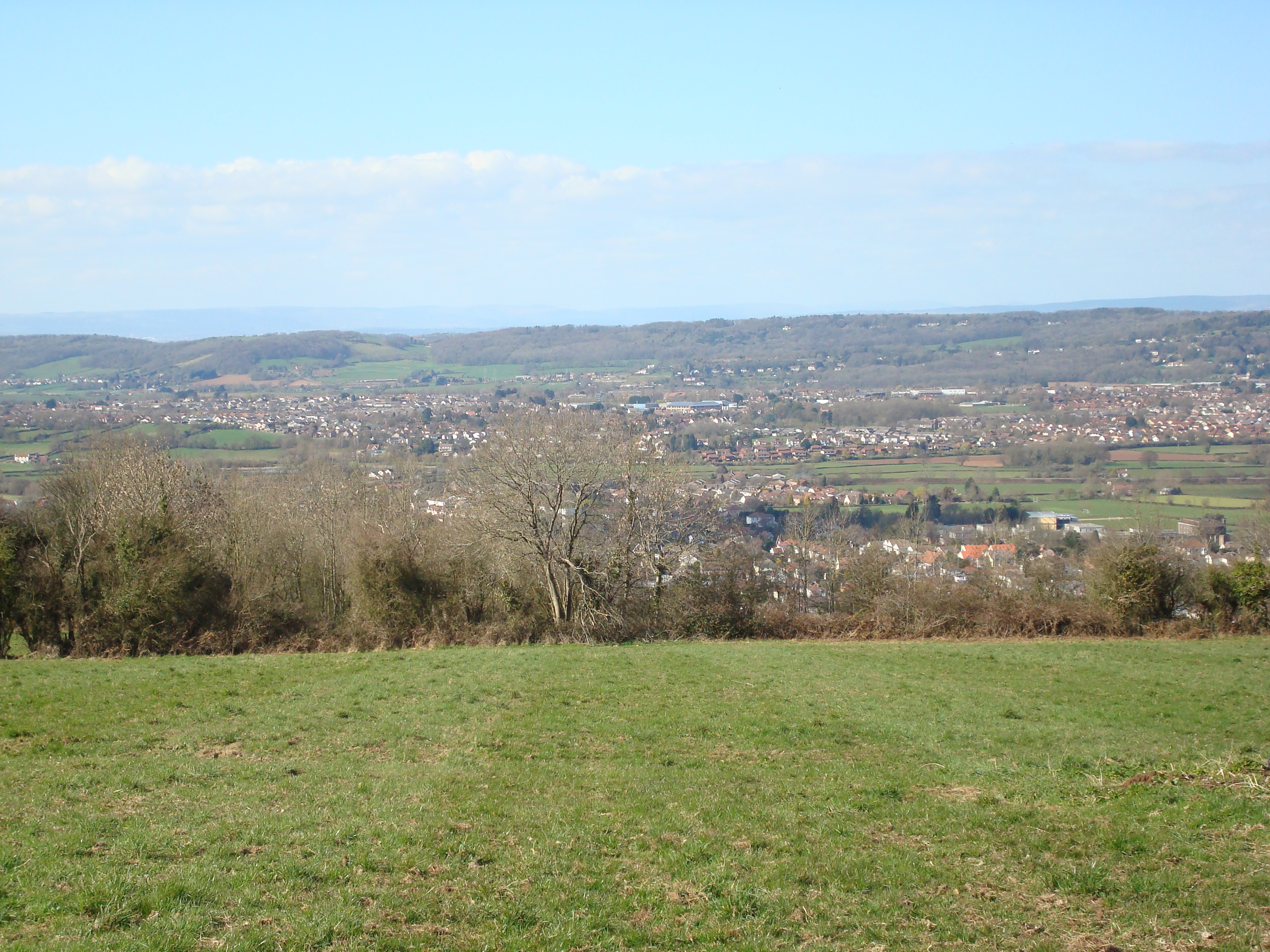
- Nailsea and Backwell viewed from Backwell Hill

- Location within Somerset
- Population: 15,539 (2021 census)
- OS grid reference: ST473703
- Civil parish: Nailsea
- Unitary authority: North Somerset
- Ceremonial county: Somerset
- Region: South West
- Country: England
- Sovereign state: United Kingdom
- Post town: Bristol
- Postcode district: BS48
- Dialling code: 01275
- Police: Avon and Somerset
- Fire: Avon
- Ambulance: South Western
- UK Parliament: North Somerset

Nailsea is a town and civil parish in North Somerset, England, 8 miles (13 km) southwest of Bristol, and 11 miles (18 km) northeast of Weston-super-Mare. The nearest village is Backwell, which lies south of Nailsea on the opposite side of the Bristol to Exeter railway line. Nailsea had a population of 15,539 in the 2021 census.

The town was an industrial centre based on coal mining and glass manufacture, which have now been replaced by service industries. The surrounding North Somerset Levels has wildlife habitats including the Tickenham, Nailsea and Kenn Moors Site of Special Scientific Interest and Bucklands Pool/Backwell Lake local nature reserve. Nailsea is close to the M5 motorway and Bristol Airport, and its railway station, Nailsea & Backwell, has services operated by the Great Western Railway.

Secondary education is provided by Nailsea School (rebuilt in 2009), and primary education by St Francis School, Grove Junior School, Kingshill School and Golden Valley. Churches include the 14th-century Holy Trinity Church and Christ Church, which was built in 1843.

== History ==
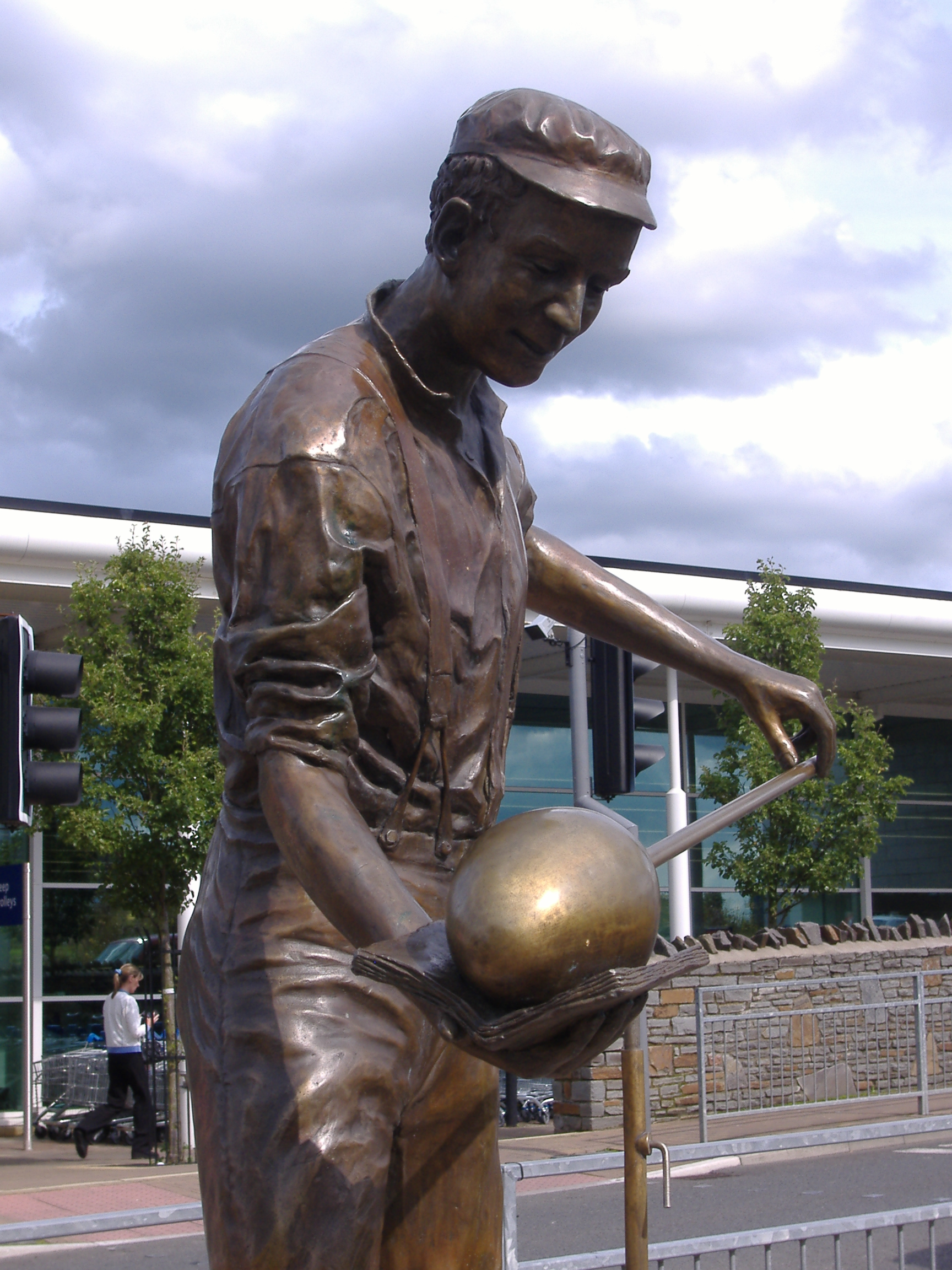
Statue of a glassblower near the site of the glassworks

The name of the town may be derived from the Old English for Naegl's island, although it has also been suggested it was spelt Naylsey in 1657.

The parish of Nailsea was part of the Portbury Hundred. Little is known of the area occupied by Nailsea before the coal mining industry began, although it was used as a quarry in Roman times from which pennant sandstone was extracted. The Romans otherwise ignored Nailsea from 40 to 400 AD, but left a small villa near Jacklands Bridge.

Nailsea's early economy relied on coal mining, which began as early as the 16th century. The earliest recorded date for coal mining in Nailsea was 1507 when coal was being transported to light fires at Yatton. By the late 1700s the town had a large number of pits. Around this time Nailsea was visited by the social reformer Hannah More who founded a Sunday school for the workers. The Elms Colliery,(Middle Engine Pit), one of the most complete examples of an 18th-century colliery left in England, is now in disrepair. It has been designated a Scheduled Ancient Monument and is included in the Heritage at Risk Register produced by English Heritage. Remains of the old pits, most of which had closed down by the late 19th century as mining capital migrated to the richer seams of South Wales, are still visible around the town.

The coal mines attracted glass manufacturer John Robert Lucas, who in 1788 established the Nailsea Glassworks that became the fourth-largest of its kind in the United Kingdom, mostly producing low-grade bottle glass. The works closed down in 1873, but "Nailsea" glass (mostly made by glass workers at the end of their shift in Nailsea and at other glass works) is still sought after by collectors around the world. The site of the glass works has been covered by a Tesco supermarket car park, leaving it relatively accessible for future archaeological digs. Other parts of the site have been cleared and filled with sand to ensure that the remains of the old glass works are preserved.

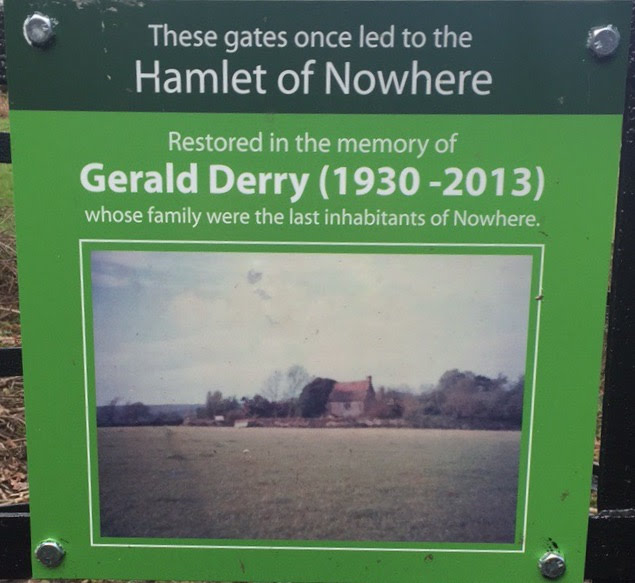
Plaque dedicated to the former inhabitants of Nowhere, at the site of the former hamlet

Nowhere was a historical hamlet that existed on the west side of the town until 1967, when it was demolished for development. Nowhere Wood, a small residential woodland, is named after it.

The 15th-century Nailsea Court, southwest of the town, is a grade I listed building.

== Governance ==
At the lower level of local government, Nailsea is a civil parish with a town council of 20 elected councillors.

At the upper tier, it is in North Somerset, a unitary authority which covers part of the ceremonial county of Somerset but it is administered independently. Its administrative headquarters is the town hall in Weston-super-Mare. For elections to North Somerset Council, Nailsea is divided across four electoral wards:

- Nailsea Golden Valley
- Nailsea West End
- Nailsea Yeo
- Nailsea Youngwood

Historically, Nailsea was part of Long Ashton Rural District in the administrative county of Somerset from 1894 to 1974. It was then in Woodspring district of the county of Avon until the creation of North Somerset unitary authority in 1996.

For elections to the House of Commons, it is in North Somerset constituency. Since the 2024 general election the constituency has been represented by Sadik Al-Hassan of the Labour Party.

== Geography ==
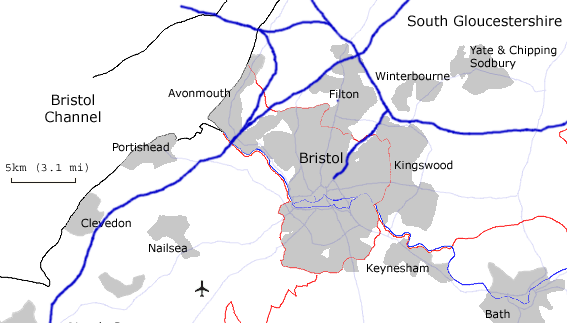
Nailsea and Greater Bristol

The Land Yeo river flows to the east of the town. The North Somerset Levels to the west have been drained and farmed by generations of farmers. Tickenham, Nailsea and Kenn Moors SSSI is a 129.4-hectare (320-acre) biological Site of Special Scientific Interest. The soils in the area include clays of the Allerton and Wentloog Series and peat soils of the Sedgemoor and Godney Series, which are drained by a network of large rhynes and smaller field ditches, which support exceptionally rich plant and invertebrate fauna communities. Exceptional populations of Coleoptera occur, amongst which are at least 12 nationally scarce species and 2 nationally rare species, including Britain's largest water beetle the great silver water beetle (Hydrophilus piceus). There are several other local nature reserves.

The Bucklands Pool/Backwell Lake local nature reserve, southeast of the town centre and close to the Nailsea and Backwell railway station, was constructed as a balancing pond in the mid-1970s, and has since become home to various wildfowl and dragonflies and a foraging area for bats. Bird species seen on the reserve include gadwall, northern shoveler, pochard, tufted duck, grey heron and mute swans.

Nearby towns and villages include Backwell, Wraxall, Portishead, Clevedon, and Tickenham. Nailsea is 8 miles (13 km) from the centre of Bristol, and close to the tourist centres of Weston-super-Mare and Bath. It is 8.5 miles (14 km) by road from the port and service area at Avonmouth.

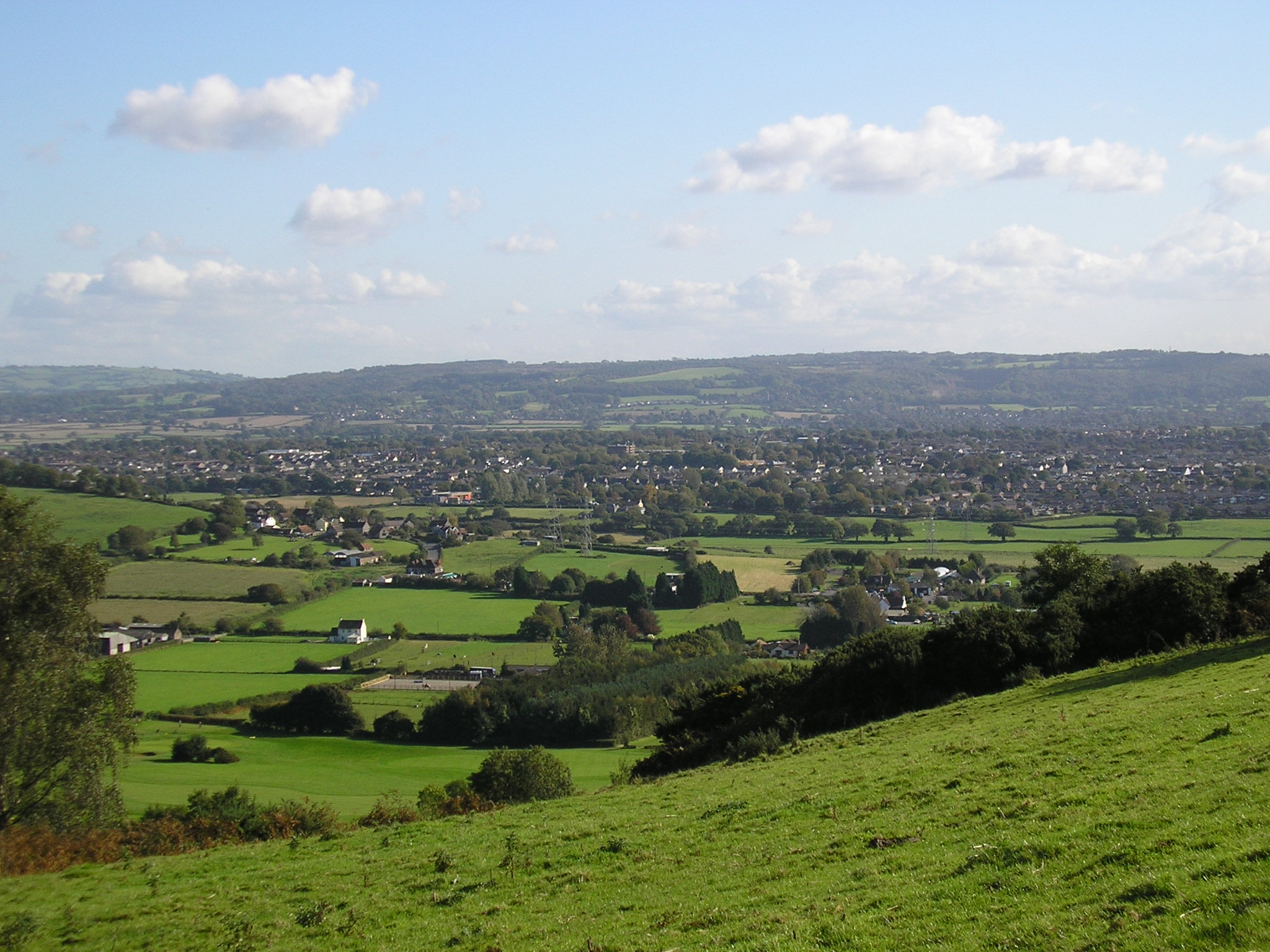
Nailsea seen from Cadbury Camp

=== Climate ===
In common with the rest of South West England, Nailsea has a temperate climate which is generally wetter and milder than the rest of the country. The annual mean temperature is approximately 10 °C (50 °F). Seasonal temperature variation is less extreme than most of the United Kingdom because of the adjacent sea temperatures. The summer months of July and August are the warmest, with mean daily maxima of approximately 21 °C (70 °F). In winter mean minimum temperatures of 1 °C (34 °F) or 2 °C (36 °F) are common. In summer the Azores high pressure affects the south-west of England, although convective cloud sometimes forms inland and reduces the number of hours of sunshine. Annual sunshine rates are slightly less than the regional average of 1,600 hours. Most of the rainfall in the south-west is caused by Atlantic depressions or by convection. Most of the rainfall in autumn and winter is caused by the Atlantic depressions, which is when they are most active. In summer, a large proportion of the rainfall is caused by the Sun heating the ground leading to convection and to showers and thunderstorms. Average rainfall is around 700 mm (28 in). About 8–15 days of snowfall is typical. November to March have the highest mean wind speeds, and June to August have the lightest winds. The predominant wind direction is from the south-west.

== Demographics ==
Census population of Nailsea parish
Census	Population	Female	Male	Households	Source
2001	16,546	8,514	8,032	6,757	
2011	15,630	8,071	7,559	6,778	
2021	15,539	8,025	7,514	6,907	

In the 2021 census, 54% of Nailsea's respondents claimed Christianity as their religious preference; 45% claimed to have "no religious preference", the second largest group.

== Economy ==
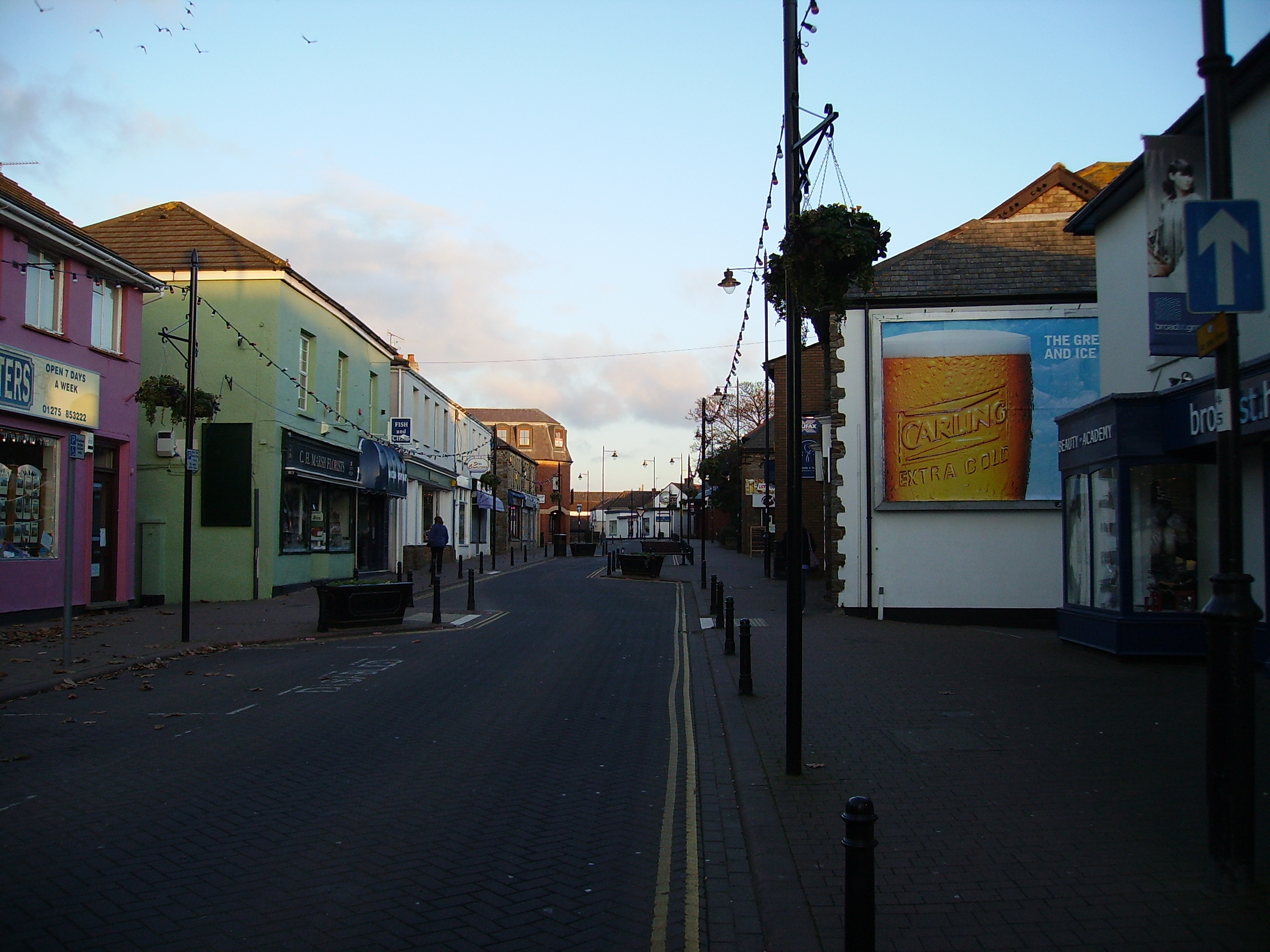
Nailsea High Street (February 2006)

Primary income often comes from employment in the service sector, including industries such as insurance and banking, defence related employment, retail and management. Employment within Nailsea includes work in shops, schools, estate agents and banks. Larger businesses in Nailsea include General Electric, and Bristol Wessex Billing Services Ltd., the billing company jointly owned by Bristol Water and Wessex Water. Other businesses are situated at units in the town. Nailsea has three large industrial and business estates located at Southfield Road, Blackfriars Road and Coates Estate (former site of the local cider making industry). Nailsea's shopping area includes Somerset Square, Crown Glass Place, Colliers Walk, and a high street. There are four supermarket chains in the town trand some national banks and estate agents.

The Coates Cider factory in Nailsea was first opened in 1788 and was bought by Showerings of Shepton Mallet in 1956. The brand was subsequently merged with Gaymers and absorbed by Matthew Clark Brands. Prior to Coates, there was Heath Brewery, owned by the Thatcher family, which was situated behind the former Friendship Inn. The site of the old factory is now called 'Coates Estate' and is home to a diverse range of both local and national businesses.

== Culture and community ==
Nailsea has several pubs and used to have a small nightclub called Decades, formerly known as the AJ's Bar. There are dedicated youth clubs and two Scouting divisions, which organise the Nailsea Carnival and Mayfair respectively. Nailsea has theatre, musical and orchestral groups. Most are open to all ages and meet and perform regularly at different venues including The Scotch Horn Centre, Nailsea Methodist Church, The Mizzymead Centre, The Grove Recreation Centre, and Nailsea Little Theatre. Nailsea's outdoor recreational areas include the playing fields by the Grove Centre and the public park to the rear of the Scotch Horn Centre and Tesco. There are three children's play parks and smaller areas of green land in the town's housing estates. The Millennium Park contains a skatepark (NSP), and a children's play park. There are no cinemas in Nailsea, but The Curzon in nearby Clevedon has been operating since 1912.

The adjacent village of Wraxall has a couple of tourist attractions. Noah's Ark Zoo Farm has displays of exotic, agricultural and domestic animals including rhinoceros, camels, monkeys, reptiles and most recently a giraffe. It offers hands-on experience with animals and a chance to learn about conservation. Tyntesfield, a 19th-century Victorian country house and grounds, was bought and opened up by the National Trust in 2002.

Nailsea has a popular carnival annually which has been held since the 1960s, in which all of the local schools and scouts participate. It also holds a very popular beer & cider festival also held annually, usually during the weekend on the second or third week of July at Nailsea and Backwell Rugby Football Club, which started in 2004. The festival holds over 160 local brews every year.

== Media ==
Local TV coverage is provided by BBC West and ITV West Country. Television signals are received from the Mendip TV transmitter and the local relay transmitters.

Local radio stations are BBC Radio Bristol, Heart West, Greatest Hits Radio South West and Hits Radio Bristol & The South West.

The town's local newspapers are the North Somerset Times and Bristol Post. An edition of the North Somerset Times is published as the Nailsea Times.

== Transport ==
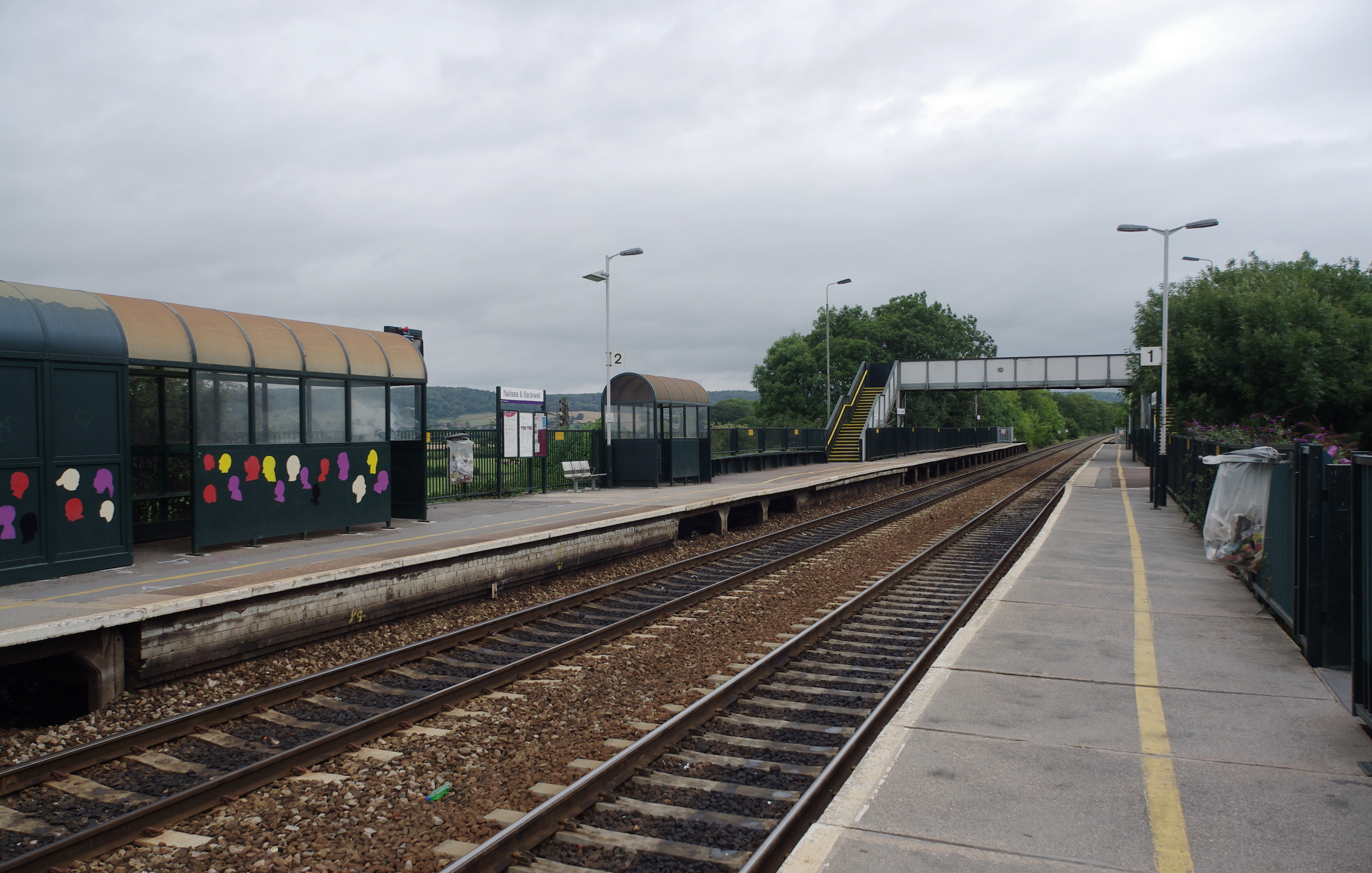
Nailsea & Backwell railway station

The principal road serving Nailsea is the B3130. It leads westwards to Clevedon, where the motorway network can be accessed at Junction 19 or 20 of the M5; eastwards it links with the A370 (for Bristol) and the A38 (for Bristol Airport). Another link to the A370 at Backwell offers a route south and west for traffic to other local towns such as Weston-super-Mare. Nailsea's main car parks are in Clevedon Road, Station Road and Link Road, all of which are free for the first three hours. Bus services in Nailsea are operated by First West of England. The main routes are the X8/9 which runs every 15 mins to Bristol and was jointly run by First and Abus, and the X7 between Bristol and Clevedon. Following the withdrawal of Abus on the X8/X9, all services in Nailsea are operated by First with exception of service 88 between Nailsea, Portishead and Clevedon operated by Carmel Coaches.

Nailsea & Backwell railway station is on the edge of neighbouring Backwell. It is managed by Great Western Railway, who run all services from the station, but is only staffed for a few hours on busy mornings. Trains run seven days each week, with a weekday off-peak service of two trains per hour in each direction, running between Taunton and Cardiff Central or Weston-super-Mare and Bristol Parkway. Mornings and evenings see some direct services to and from London Paddington. Platform 1 (westbound) can only be accessed by steps, but Platform 2 (eastbound) can be reached either by steps or a 1 in 12 (8%) ramp. The station has a car park for 100 cars, but is due for expansion. Over 350,000 journeys are made from the station each year.

Bristol Airport is less than 10 miles (16 km) from the town centre.

== Education ==
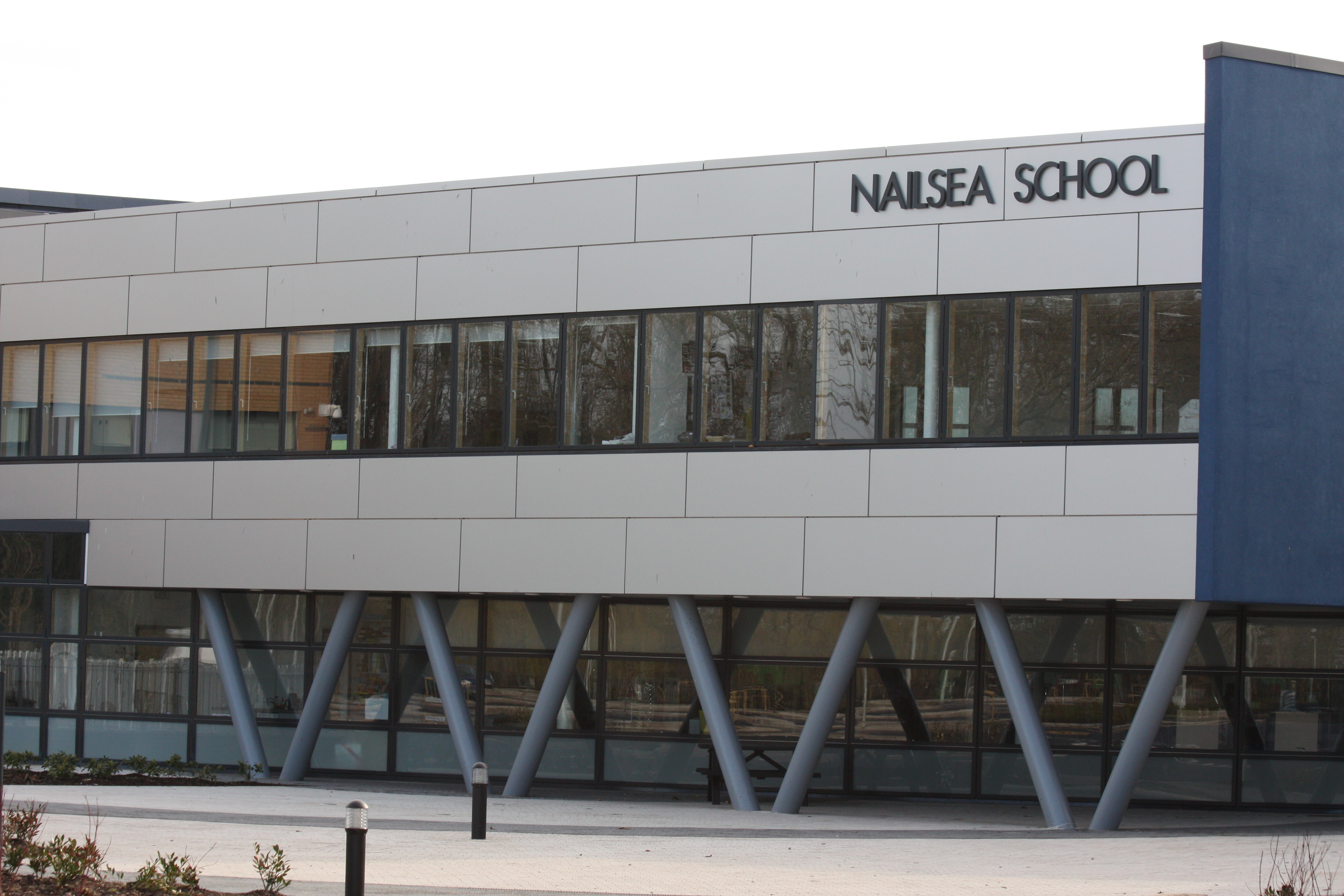
Nailsea School

Secondary education in Nailsea is provided by Nailsea School, which attained Technology and Media Arts College specialist status before a £28.8 million revamp in 2010. Nailsea has infants, junior, primary schools, and a music school, some of them including: Kings Hill C of E, Golden Valley, Hannah More Infants, St Francis Catholic School and Grove School. Ravenswood School caters for children with special needs and learning difficulties. There are also playgroups for children in the area who are too young for infants school.

== Religious sites ==
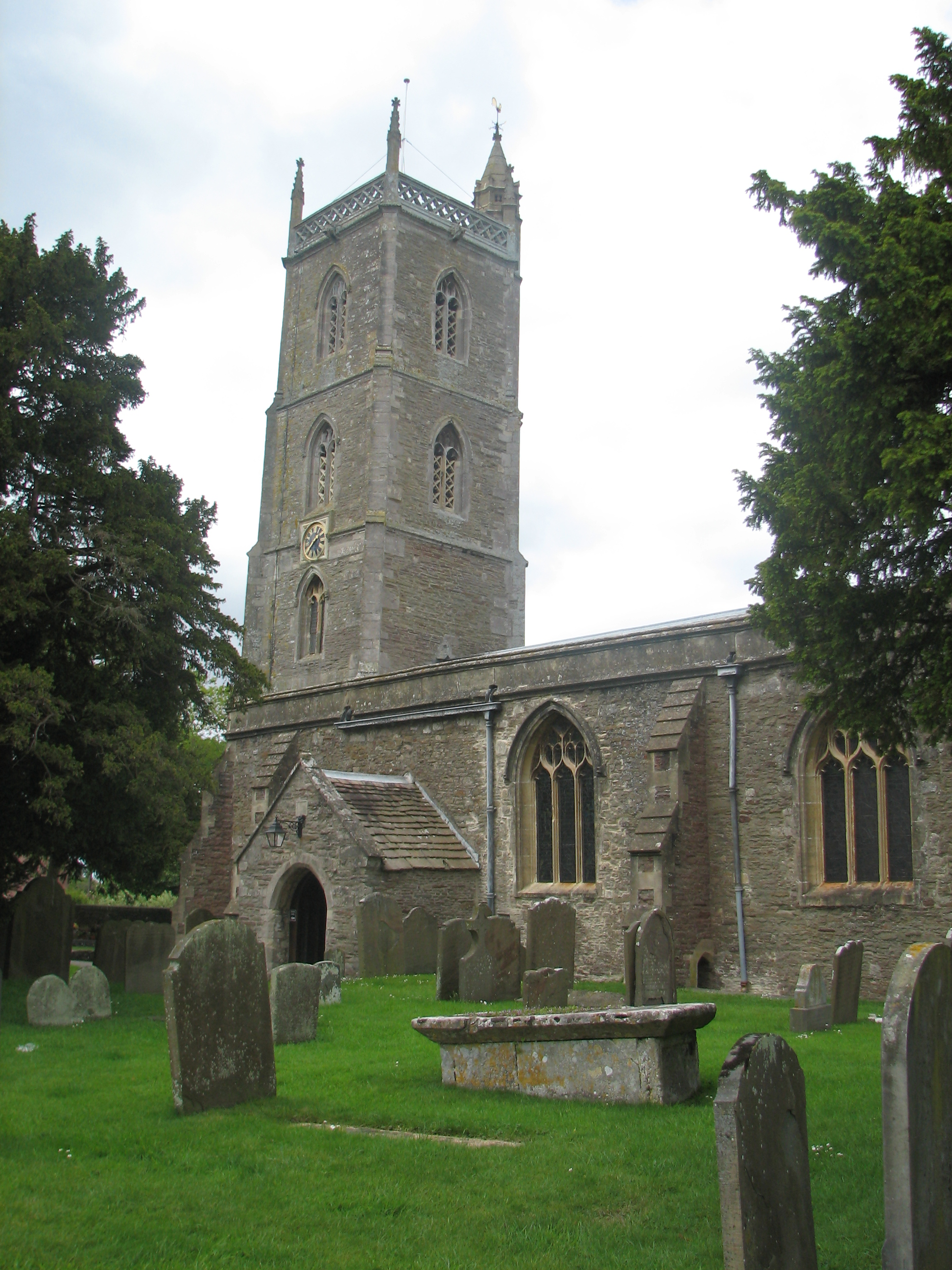
Holy Trinity Church building and cemetery

Nailsea Methodist Church was founded in 1789; the first building opened three years later. In 1914 a new chapel was opened on Silver Street, and a youth club was added in the 1960s. In early 1992 the old church was replaced with a larger, flexible, multi-purpose building and the youth club was refurbished and renamed the Wesley Centre after Methodism's founder, John Wesley. There is also Nailsea Baptist Church, the Catholic Church of St Francis of Assisi, Southfield Church, the United Reformed Church and the Community Church.

== Sports ==
Nailsea has four football clubs, AFC Nailsea, Selkirk United, Nailsea United FC and Nailsea & Tickenham F.C. The two clubs also organise junior football teams in the area, catering for under 8s to under 16s. Nailsea Cricket Club was formed in the mid-1850s and runs six sides across senior, junior, and women's cricket, covering an area of West Bristol and North Somerset.

Nailsea also has a ladies hockey club, which was formed in 1924. The club has two league teams: a youth team and a veterans team. The Scotch Horn Centre provides both an aerobic exercise and a free weights gym, as well as squash courts, and room for other indoor sports. Nailsea does not have a public swimming pool despite a long-running campaign by the Nailsea Swimming Pool Interest Group to build one. Other leisure facilities in the area include a swimming pool in nearby Backwell and a golf club in Tickenham. Nailsea also has a croquet club with four full-sized lawns (Nailsea and District Croquet Club).

Nailsea and Backwell Rugby Football Club's 1st XV play in level 8 of the RFU league system as of 2012, and the 2nd XV in Somerset 2 North (level 10).

== Notable people ==
Notable people born, raised or living in Nailsea include:

- Adge Cutler (1930–1974), was one of Nailsea's best known celebrities. He was a Somerset folk singer, with the backing band The Wurzels. He worked at the Coates cider factory. The Wurzels' album Live at the Royal Oak was recorded at The Royal Oak, a public house on the High Street. Cutler is buried in Christ Church graveyard.
- Sir Nigel Thrift (born 1949), went to school locally, a British academic and geographer.
- James Heappey (born 1981), former soldier and MP for Wells, grew up locally.
- Mollie Pearce, English television personality, model and runner-up on The Traitors.

=== Sport ===
- Stephen Newton (1853–1916), a cricketer who played 33 First-class cricket games for Somerset.
- Charles Sederman (1881–1952), gymnast who competed in the 1908 Summer Olympics.
- Mervyn Kitchen (born 1940), a first-class cricketer and a left-handed batsman for Somerset County Cricket Club, making 15,230 runs in his 354 First-class cricket games. He also umpired 20 Test matches and 28 One Day Internationals before retiring in 2005.
- Chris Wood (born 1987), golfer, grew up locally and resides there.
- Rebecca Holloway (born 1995), footballer who has played about 100 games and 10 for Northern Ireland women.
