= Claire Perry O'Neill =

British politician

The Right Honourable Claire Perry
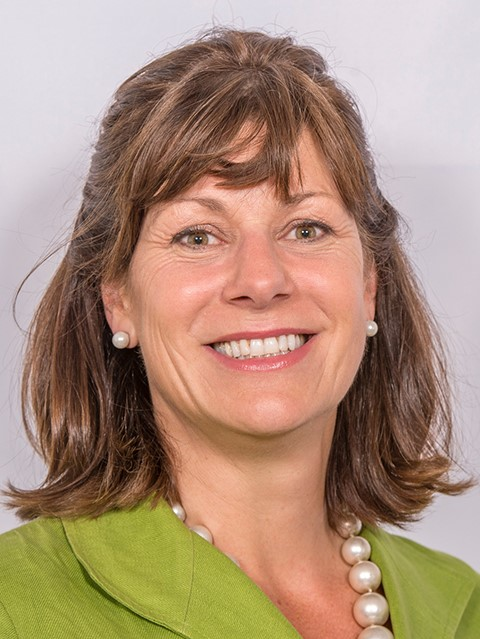
- Official portrait, 2018

Minister of State for Energy and Clean Growth (Note: Perry initially served as Minister of State for Climate Change and Industry but the office was retitled and given right to attend Cabinet in January 2018.)
- In office 12 June 2017 – 24 July 2019 (Note: Perry went on leave of absence from 20 May 2019 – with Chris Skidmore taking over in the interim – until Boris Johnson appointed her successor, Kwasi Kwarteng, in July 2019.)
- Prime Minister: Theresa May
- Preceded by: Nick Hurd
- Succeeded by: Kwasi Kwarteng

Parliamentary Under-Secretary of State for Rail
- In office 15 July 2014 – 14 July 2016
- Prime Minister: David Cameron
- Preceded by: Stephen Hammond
- Succeeded by: Paul Maynard

Member of Parliament for Devizes
- In office 6 May 2010 – 6 November 2019
- Preceded by: Michael Ancram
- Succeeded by: Danny Kruger

Personal details
- Born: Claire Louise Richens; 3 April 1964 (age 62) Bromsgrove, Worcestershire, England
- Party: Independent (since 2023)
- Other political affiliations: Conservative (before 2023)
- Spouses: Clayton Perry (m. 1996; div. 2013); William O'Neill (m. 2018)
- Children: 3
- Education: Brasenose College, Oxford; Harvard University
- Occupation: Politician
- Profession: Investment banking

Claire Louise O'Neill (née Richens, formerly Perry; born 3 April 1964) is a British businesswoman and former politician who previously served as Minister of State for Energy and Clean Growth from 2017 to 2019 and as managing director for climate and energy at the World Business Council for Sustainable Development from 2020 to 2021. Since 2022 she has been one of its directors and jointly chairs its Global Imperatives Advisory Board.

Formerly a member of the Conservative Party, she was Member of Parliament (MP) for Devizes in Wiltshire from 2010 to 2019.

== Early life ==
Claire Louise Richens was born in Bromsgrove, Worcestershire, and brought up in North Somerset. She is the youngest of three children of David and Joanne Richens. She was educated at Nailsea School in Somerset and at Brasenose College, Oxford, where she read geography, graduating BA in 1985.

One of her contemporaries at Brasenose was George Monbiot, who described her in his column for The Guardian as at the time "a firebrand who wanted to nationalise the banks and overthrow capitalism". After Oxford, she worked at Bank of America from 1985 to 1988, then joined the Harvard Business School, where she gained an MBA in 1990. She then worked as Engagement Manager at McKinsey & Company from 1990 to 1994, and next as Director and Head of Equities E-commerce at Credit Suisse from 1994 to 2000.

== Parliamentary career ==
After joining the Conservative Party in 2006, Perry worked for Shadow Chancellor George Osborne. She was selected in November 2009 as a Conservative candidate after Michael Ancram announced his intention to stand down from Devizes, a safe seat for her party. In her maiden speech she was critical of the previous Labour government's management of the rural economy, adding: "we do not get as many jobcentres per head of the population in rural Britain". She also paid tribute to the Armed Forces, as Devizes is home to 11,000 soldiers.

In October 2011, Perry was appointed as Parliamentary Private Secretary to Philip Hammond, the Secretary of State for Defence. She held this role until October 2013, when she became a Government Assistant Whip. On 15 July 2014, Perry was appointed Parliamentary Under-Secretary of State for Transport, with responsibility for rail fares, rail franchising, freight and logistics and transport agencies. She resigned from this position on 14 July 2016, at the time of a reshuffle, when Theresa May became prime minister, the day after saying in a debate she was "often ashamed to be the Rail Minister".

Perry campaigned for improvements in online safety, and in 2011 led an Independent Parliamentary Inquiry into Online Child Protection, with a particular focus on online pornography. She was subsequently appointed by the prime minister, David Cameron, as an adviser on preventing the sexualisation and commercialisation of children.

Perry argued for blocks on pornography for all internet users unless they opt out of it, citing the need to protect children. In July 2013, hackers placed pornographic images on Perry's own website. Perry accused political blogger Paul Staines – known for his Guido Fawkes blog – of sponsoring the attack, while Staines threatened to sue her for libel if the claim was not removed. After Internet filters started to be rolled out, news agencies reported that a wide range of non-pornographic websites were now being censored by UK Internet service providers as a result of false-positive results for blocked phrases, including Perry's own website, as a result of her frequent use of words such as "porn" and "sex" in web posts about her pro-censorship campaign.

In October 2012, Perry mistakenly stated that the national debt and national deficit were the same thing in a discussion on BBC Radio 5 Live.

In September 2014, she mentioned a possible revival of the use of women-only carriages during a speech to a fringe event at the Conservative Party conference.

Perry campaigned for the United Kingdom to remain in the EU during the 2016 membership referendum, and argued after the vote that some members of her party were "like jihadis" in their support for a "hard Brexit" and said the tone of the debate on leaving the European Union "borders on the hysterical". She was one of only seven Conservative MPs to vote for an amendment arguing that Parliament should have the final say on any deal to leave the EU. She subsequently voted with her party in approving the decision to invoke Article 50.

Perry was appointed as Minister of State for Energy and Clean Growth at the Department for Business, Energy and Industrial Strategy by Theresa May in her second ministry, after the June 2017 reshuffle. During the January 2018 cabinet reshuffle, she was given the right to attend Cabinet.

In November 2018 the PCS, FDA and Prospect unions raised concerns with senior officials at the Department of Business, Energy and Industrial Strategy that Perry had been accused of swearing and shouting at staff. The shadow Cabinet Office minister Jon Trickett said that the unions had raised "serious allegations" and urged officials to "look into them carefully".

The Daily Telegraph reported in May 2019 that she was claiming £9,843 per year tax-free in Parliamentary expenses for her three children – aged 17, 19 and 22, the two eldest of whom were at university – on top of her salary as MP and Minister of State for Energy, totalling £111,148, and her standard tax-free "second home allowance" of £22,760. She did not deny the report, but said that she had not broken any Parliamentary rules.

Perry took leave of absence from Parliament on 20 May 2019, and announced in September 2019 that she would not stand at the next general election, which took place in December of that year.

== Later career ==
In September 2019, while still a member of parliament, Perry was nominated as President of the 26th United Nations Climate Change Conference, to be held in Glasgow in November 2020. In the same month, she announced that she would not stand for re-election to Parliament, and in November the Conservatives selected Danny Kruger to stand instead. He was elected at the general election on 12 December.

On 31 January 2020, the United Kingdom government abruptly removed Perry from the Presidential post, stating that it would become "a ministerial role". She later criticised actions of the prime minister's adviser Dominic Cummings, saying he "put out a deeply defamatory briefing to the media the day he fired me, claiming that the COP didn't need a President".

In September 2020, Perry was appointed as managing director for climate and energy at the World Business Council for Sustainable Development (WBCSD), a membership organisation for companies, which works on a variety of issues related to sustainable development. She stepped down from this role in 2021 and since 2022 has been Co-Chair of the Global Imperatives Advisory Board which advises the WBCSD and also serves as one of its Directors.

Since 2022, she has also been a Senior Global Advisor to McKinsey & Co. and is the Founder and Chief Executive of ClaireON Ltd, offering climate and energy advisory services.

=== Political allegiance ===
In January 2023, Perry announced that she had resigned from the Conservative Party, despite her admiration for the Prime Minister, Rishi Sunak, and his Chancellor, Jeremy Hunt. Perry claimed that the Conservative Party had become dominated by "ideology and self-obsession" and explained that Britain's strained relations with the European Union were also behind her decision to quit. Perry praised Keir Starmer and backed him to provide "sober, fact-driven, competent political leadership".

== Personal life ==
In 1996, Claire Richens married firstly Clayton Perry, and they had one son and two daughters. In 2013, Perry was living in the Vale of Pewsey in Wiltshire. Her first marriage was dissolved in 2014. Three months after she announced her separation, it was reported that Perry had begun a relationship with Professor Bill O'Neill, a researcher and academic on lasers, whom she had met through constituency work; they were married in 2018.

== Notes ==
Parliament of the United Kingdom
Preceded by Michael Ancram	Member of Parliament for Devizes; 2010–2019	Succeeded by Danny Kruger
Political offices
Preceded by Stephen Hammond	Parliamentary Under-Secretary of State for Transport; 2014–2016	Succeeded by Paul Maynard
