= Hebron Church, Long Ashton =

Church in Somerset, England

Hebron Church
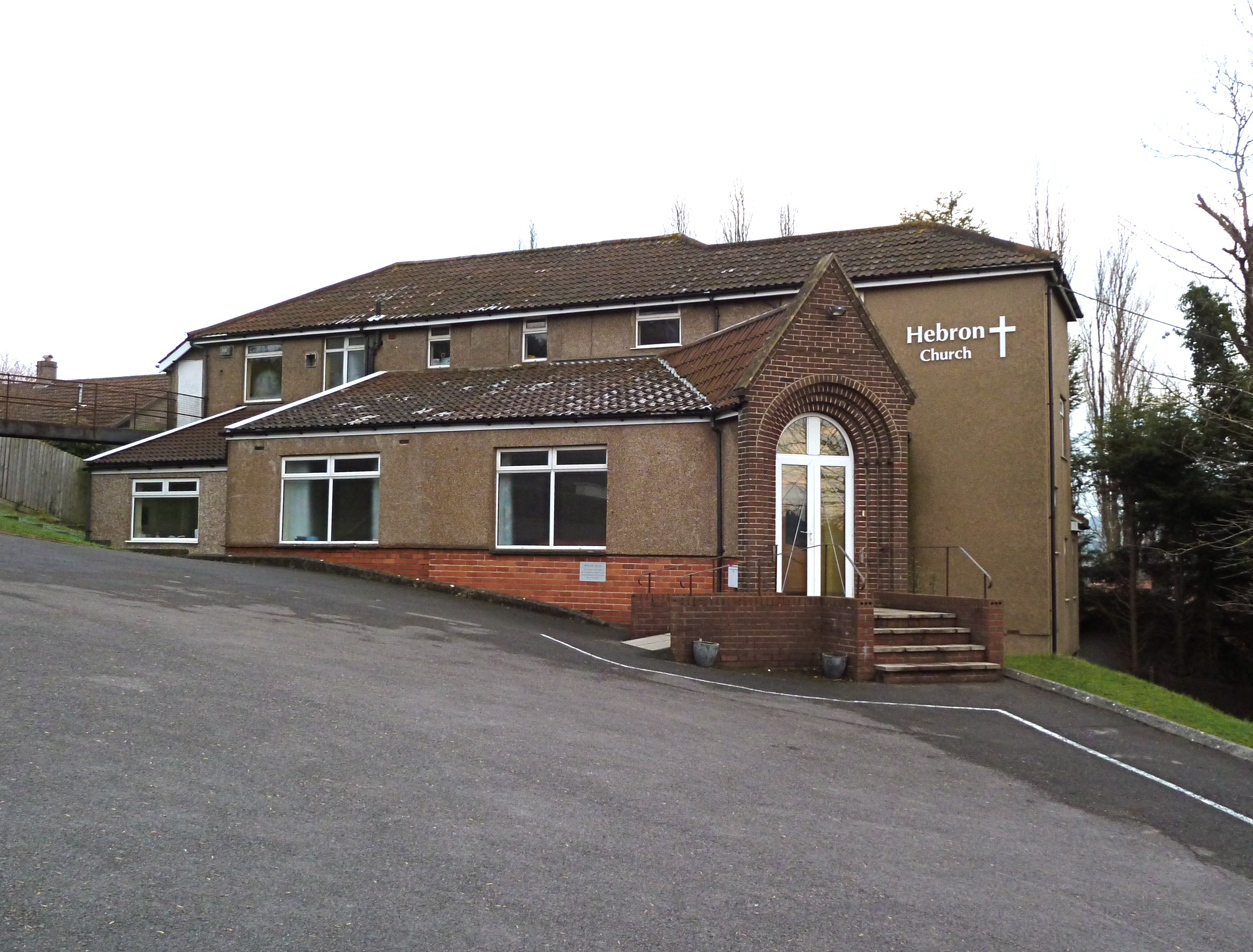
- Hebron Church
- 51.431131°N 2.662861°W
- Location: Long Ashton, Somerset
- Country: England
- Churchmanship: Evangelical
- Website: www.hebron-church.co.uk

History
- Founded: 1934
- Founder: Ernest Dyer

Hebron Church is an evangelical church in Long Ashton, North Somerset, near Bristol in England, was first founded in 1934 by Ernest Dyer.

The church has a membership of around 30 with an average Sunday morning congregation of around 50. Hebron Church attracts members from the Baptist, Methodist, Pentecostal, Anglican and Roman Catholic denominations. The church also has activities for children and young people such as the youth group "God's Gang" and a Kid's club on some Sunday afternoons.

== History ==
The church arose out of a Sunday school and youth club by Mr Dyer, who cycled weekly from the Somerdale Factory in Keynsham to run the clubs. Mr Dyer lived above the Church until his death in 1967. His sister continued living there until her subsequent death. The church was named “Hebron” because an aim was for it to be a “place of refuge”.

During the 1930s and 1940s, Dr Vernon Charley, who developed the blackcurrant drink Ribena whilst at the Long Ashton Research Station, was the organist and an elder of the church. During the 1950s, Roger T. Forster, founder of Ichthus Christian Fellowship was a regular preacher whilst doing National Service with the RAF.
