= Charles Sederman =

British gymnast (1881–1952)

- Full name: Charles Victor Sederman
- Born: 9 January 1881 Nailsea, England
- Died: 9 September 1952 (aged 71) Cardiff, Wales

Gymnastics career
- Discipline: Men's artistic gymnastics
- Country represented: (United Kingdom) Great Britain; Wales

Charles Victor Sederman (9 January 1881 – 9 September 1952) was a British gymnast who competed in the 1908 Summer Olympics. He was born in Nailsea and died in Cardiff. A member of the Welsh national gymnastic team from 1906 until 1909, he also played rugby for Penarth and was a founder and secretary of the Welsh Amateur Boxing Association. He was a boxing judge at the 1948 Summer Olympics in London.
