= Nailsea School =

Academy in England

Coordinates: 51°25′50″N 2°45′18″W

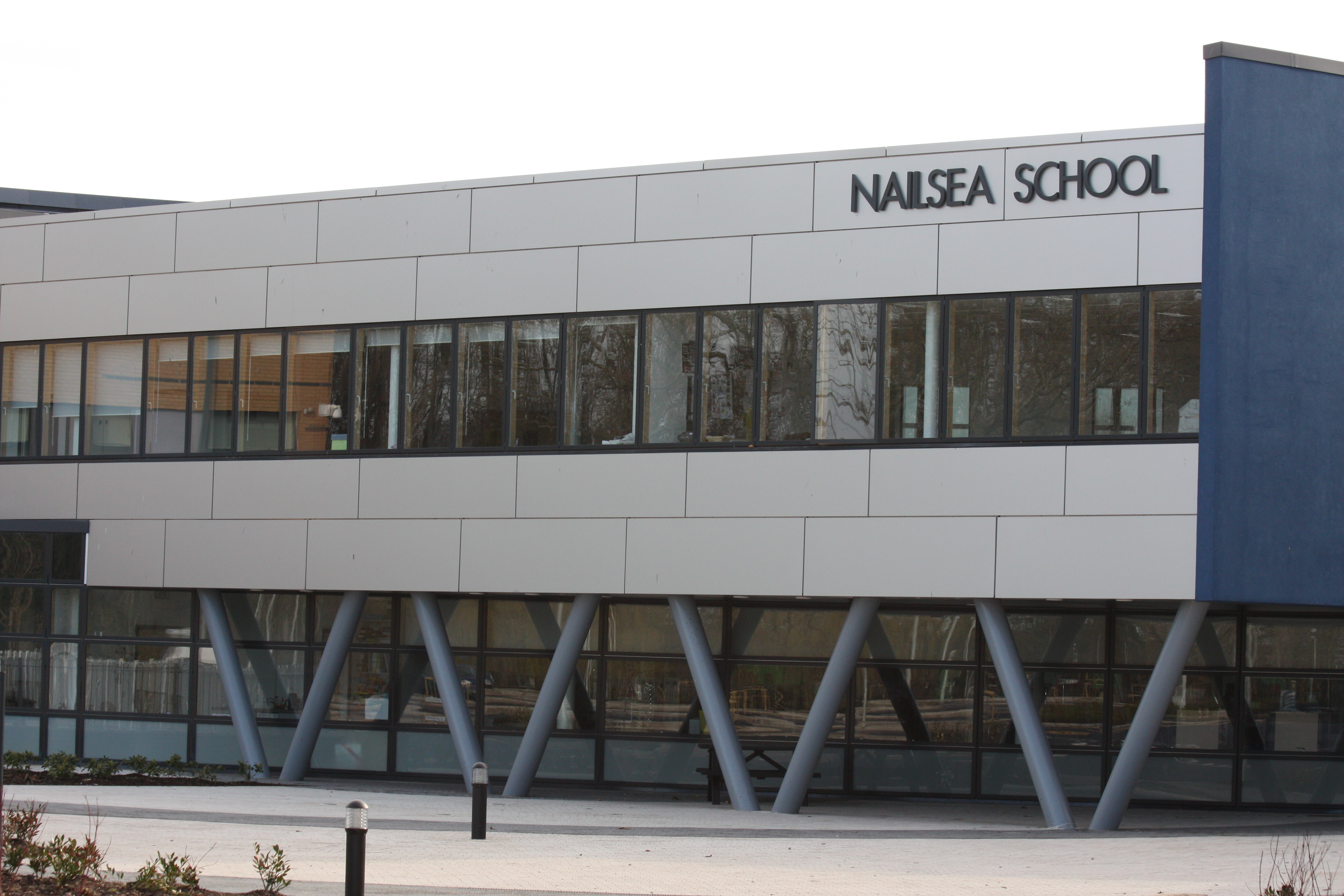

Location
- Mizzymead Road; Nailsea, North Somerset, BS48 2HN; England

Information
- Type: Academy
- Motto: Aspire, Believe, Succeed
- Established: 1960
- Local authority: North Somerset
- Trust: Wessex Learning Trust
- Specialist: Technology and Media
- Department for Education URN: 138466 Tables
- Ofsted: Reports
- Chair of Governors: S Renny
- Head teacher: Dionne Elliott
- Age: 11 to 18
- Enrolment: 1,026
- Houses: Dragon Griffin; Phoenix Unicorn
- Website: http://www.nailseaschool.com

Nailsea School, located in Nailsea, North Somerset, England, is a mixed secondary school and sixth form. It has Technology and Media Arts College specialist school status, and became an academy on 1 September 2012. Academy status means Nailsea School now receives funding directly from the government, where before it was funded by the local authority, however the daily running of the school stays much the same.

Nailsea School was opened in 1959 as a grammar school with just over 90 students. In 1966, the school became a Secondary Comprehensive, catering for students from 11 to 18 years

In 2006, the school population was more than 1,350, with a planned admission number of 240 students per year. As of 2015, the enrollment was 1,009 including 190 in the sixth form.

In 2009, a brand new building was opened to house the school.

In September 2019, the 60@Sixty campaign was started to mark the sixtieth anniversary of the school being opened.

In January 2021, Nailsea School became the 14th school to be a part of the Wessex Learning Trust, a multi academy trust based in Cheddar, Somerset alongside Kings of Wessex Academy in Cheddar.

== Academic performance ==
=== 2006 ===
Its A/AS-Level performance and pupils' improvement was only slightly below the national average, and its overall performance then was 4th in North Somerset.

=== 2007 ===
In 2007, its GCSE performance rose by 8% from 51% to 65%.

Its A/AS-Level points rose and its overall performance was maintained as 4th in North Somerset.

=== 2009 ===
In 2009, described by the school as a 'truly outstanding year', 74% of year 11 students achieved 5 A* to C grades at GCSE. This represents the highest achievement at GCSE level in the school's history, despite the possible disruption caused by the impending move to the new school site.

Six students achieved at least three A grades at A-level with one fifth of all exams taken by the students resulting in A grades. 62 per cent were at least a C grade.

=== 2010 ===
GCSE results at the school broke all previous records set by previous year groups. The results for 2010 showed that 79% of students gained at least five grades at A*-C, while 65% obtained five A* to C including maths and English.

Nailsea School Sixth Form students also obtained excellent results in 2010. Nailsea School staff described this year's A-level results as 'outstanding' as they beat records set last year. Almost 79 per cent of all students achieved A*-C grades. 12 per cent of students achieved three or more A or A* grades.

== New building 2007–2010 ==
In September 2006 Nailsea School was selected to be one of the schools in the Building Schools for the Future (BSF) project funded by the Department for Education and Skills (DfES). This £28.8 million funding made it the largest project undertaken by North Somerset. The new building, which now houses the whole school, was constructed within the grounds and completely replaced the previous buildings. The contractor was Carillion. The opening coincided with the celebration of Nailsea School's 50th anniversary.

The new building comprises accommodation for all the students, and includes a dedicated Sixth Form area for years 12 and 13. The lower floor has a large walk through atrium, allowing access to the library and social areas. The building has a state-of-the art 350-seat theatre which is used for school performances, such as plays, fashions shows and music events. Science teaching can make use of a 150-seat lecture theatre and two large super-laboratories for practical work. Music has its own dedicated space with practice rooms as well as a recording studio. Sports facilities include a sports hall, a dance studio with a sprung floor and ballet bar, and a 4th generation rubber-crumb all-weather pitch for a variety of team sports. Outdoor facilities also include a running track around the playing field, a long jumping track with pit and a courtyard garden, designed by some of the students of the school.

The annual Nailsea School Community Showcase was held at the new school building for the first time in March 2010.

The new building was officially opened by Prince Richard, Duke of Gloucester in September 2010.

=== Press coverage ===
During the lead up to the new school being built students were invited to contribute to the discussion about the facilities that they wished to see in the new school.

During 2009 an issue about a brand of trousers caused controversy. The headteacher, David New, ruled that "Miss Sexy" trousers were unacceptable and they have been banned from the school, as they revealed the shape of the students underwear and created a "negative impression" of the school. To coincide with the move to the new building a new uniform was designed by the students of the school and from September 2010 all students are wearing the uniform they chose. However, in September 2010, an issue concerning the banning of short skirts caused controversy when the parents of one of the students claimed that the recommended retailer for school uniforms did not stock a skirt which fitted their daughter and conformed to the school rules, and that because of their daughter's height it was difficult to find such a skirt.

== Notable alumni ==
- Professor Sir Nigel Thrift, former Vice-Chancellor of the University of Warwick and distinguished geographer.
- Claire Perry, former Conservative MP for Devizes (2010–2019)

== Nailsea School Radio ==
The school has a radio station, Nailsea School Radio. The station started out as an idea by a Nailsea School pupil, who drew up a business case including budget and predicted costs before approaching the school to seek support. In January 2008 the school approved the team's application and began to fund the radio station through its Technology and Media Arts College specialist school status. The team then worked on creating weekly podcasts until September 2008 when daily live shows started.

The station's primary output is aimed at the pupils of the school, with its daytime output consisting of school news and current hit music. After school output can vary, from the Live Requests Show to more specialist shows such as the Genre Show. All the shows are created by the pupils, with students taking all roles within the station from presenting, producing, Web design, journalism and the station management. Currently the station has over 22 pupils working with the project.

The station also takes part in many community-based broadcasts covering events in Nailsea and the wider area.

A typical fortnight's output currently has 19 shows (approximately 1 hour per show), but will be expanding to a full 20 hours by April 2010.
