= Barrow Gurney Reservoirs =

Coordinates: 51.40915°N 2.66276°W

- Barrow Gurney Tanks; Barrow Tanks
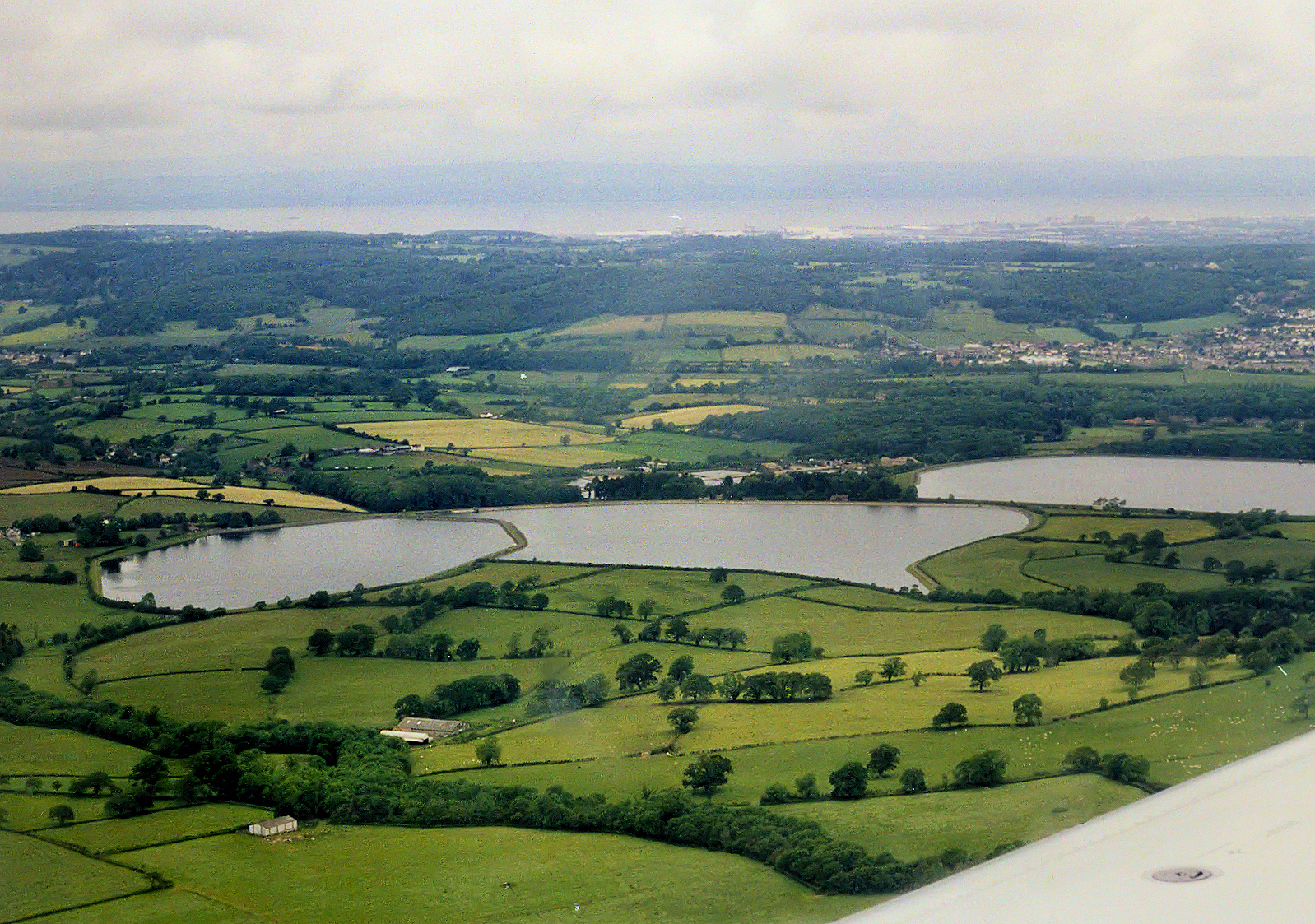
- The three Barrow Tanks. Number 1 is on the left, number two in the middle and number three on the right.
- Interactive map of Barrow Gurney Reservoirs
- Location: Near Barrow Gurney, Somerset, England
- Type: Reservoirs
- Managing agency: Bristol Water
- Built: 1852
- Surface area: 25 acres (10 ha) (Tank 1); 40 acres (16 ha) (Tank 2); 60 acres (24 ha) (Tank 3)

Location of Barrow Gurney Reservoirs within Somerset.

Barrow Gurney Reservoirs (grid reference ST5468) (also known as Barrow Gurney Tanks or Barrow Tanks) are three artificial reservoirs for drinking water near the village of Barrow Gurney, which lies southwest of Bristol, England. They are known by their numbers rather than names.

== Overview ==
The tanks are fed by several springs including one which becomes the Land Yeo. Some of the outfall is also used to feed the river which flows to the Bristol Channel.

There are three reservoirs in total, one (Tank number three, 60 acres (24 ha) to the north of the A38 and two (Tank number one, 25 acres (10 ha) and number two, 40 acres (16 ha) to the south.

The reservoirs are operated by Bristol Water. The first opened in 1852 to store the water from the newly finished "Line of Works", but within two years it developed a leak and had to be drained for repair, causing serious disruption to Bristol's water supply. Over the following decades, work was undertaken to improve the water quality. First with sand filters and in 1935 with chlorination.

During 1962 maximum output was increased from 26 million imperial gallons (120,000 m^{3}) to 31 million imperial gallons (140,000 m^{3}) a day by lowering the outlet of the filtered tank and duplicating inlets to the seven filters which received microstrained water.

The stony banks on all the tanks provide a habitat for sedges.

Fishing (under permit) is generally for rainbow (Oncorhynchus mykiss, formerly Salmo iridia) and Brown trout (Salmo trutta morpha fario and S. trutta morpha lacustris).
