= Gatcombe, Somerset =

Gatcombe
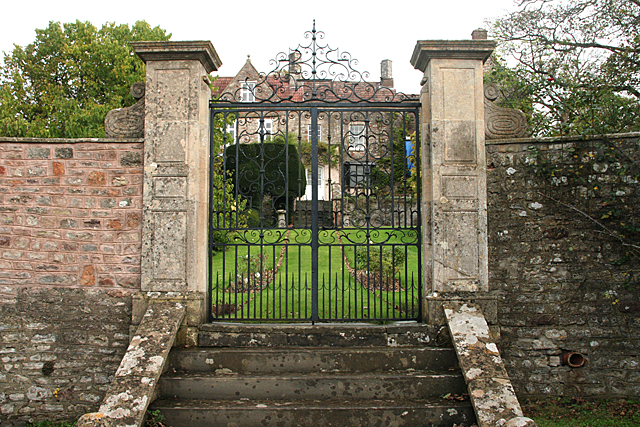

- Location within Somerset
- 51°25′32″N 2°40′56″W
- Location: Long Ashton, Somerset, England

Scheduled monument
- Official name: Roman settlement, part of an associated field system and earlier Iron Age settlement remains at Gatcombe Farm
- Designated: 5 December 1955
- Reference no.: 1011978

Listed Building – Grade II*
- Official name: Gatcombe Court
- Designated: 16 March 1984
- Reference no.: 1137925

Gatcombe at Ashton Watering within the civil parish of Long Ashton, Somerset, England, is the location of a Grade II* listed building which was built on the site of a Roman settlement.

It is close to the Land Yeo river, the A370 road and the Bristol to Exeter railway line.

== Roman settlement ==
Roman remains were first identified at the site in 1839 when a railway cutting was being constructed. Excavations in the 1960s showed that the site was occupied from the middle of the 1st century until at least the fifth century, demonstrated by the coins of Theodosius, Magnus Maximus and Arcadius which have been found. The full extent of the site is unclear, beyond a specific villa but there is some evidence that the site is much more extensive, possibly forming a village or even a town. It has been speculated that this may be the site of Iscalis as described by Ptolemy, however it has also been suggested this may have been at Charterhouse Roman Town.

The Roman site had a 15 feet (4.6 m) wide wall around it, enclosing an area of around 16 acres (6.5 ha), although this is obscured on the southern side near the railway line, A 60 feet (18 m) deep well has also been uncovered.

At least nineteen agricultural buildings have been identified within the enclosure. In addition one building at the southern end of the site included a colonnade and mosaic and other features suggesting it was a sizeable Roman villa. A magnetometry survey conducted during 2009 and 2010 identified several likely buildings outside the enclosed area.

The site was connected to Abbots Leigh by a Roman road.

== Current building ==
Gatcombe Court was built in the late 14th century, based on a solar built by John de Gatcombe before 1254. The house was further altered in the late 17th century and again in the 20th century. The two-storey house has tiled roofs with attics into two steep gables.

The garden includes a yew hedge which is believed to be 400 years old and a recently added Roman herb garden designed by Jekka McVicar. Near the house is an old mill on the Land Yeo. There is evidence of a snuff mill at the site in 1769, however the current building dates from the early 19th century. By 1846 it had been converted to grind mustard, annatto and drugs, but by 1874 was a flour mill. The internal machinery is still in place and the mill has been designated as a Grade II listed building.

It was the family home of the Somerset Cricketer Osbert Mordaunt and then the family of Charles Clarke, of the Bristol law firm Osborne Clarke. It is now home to Stella Clarke.

In the 17th century a farmhouse was built on the site. This was altered in the 19th century.
