= Long Ashton =

Coordinates: 51.43°N 2.65°W

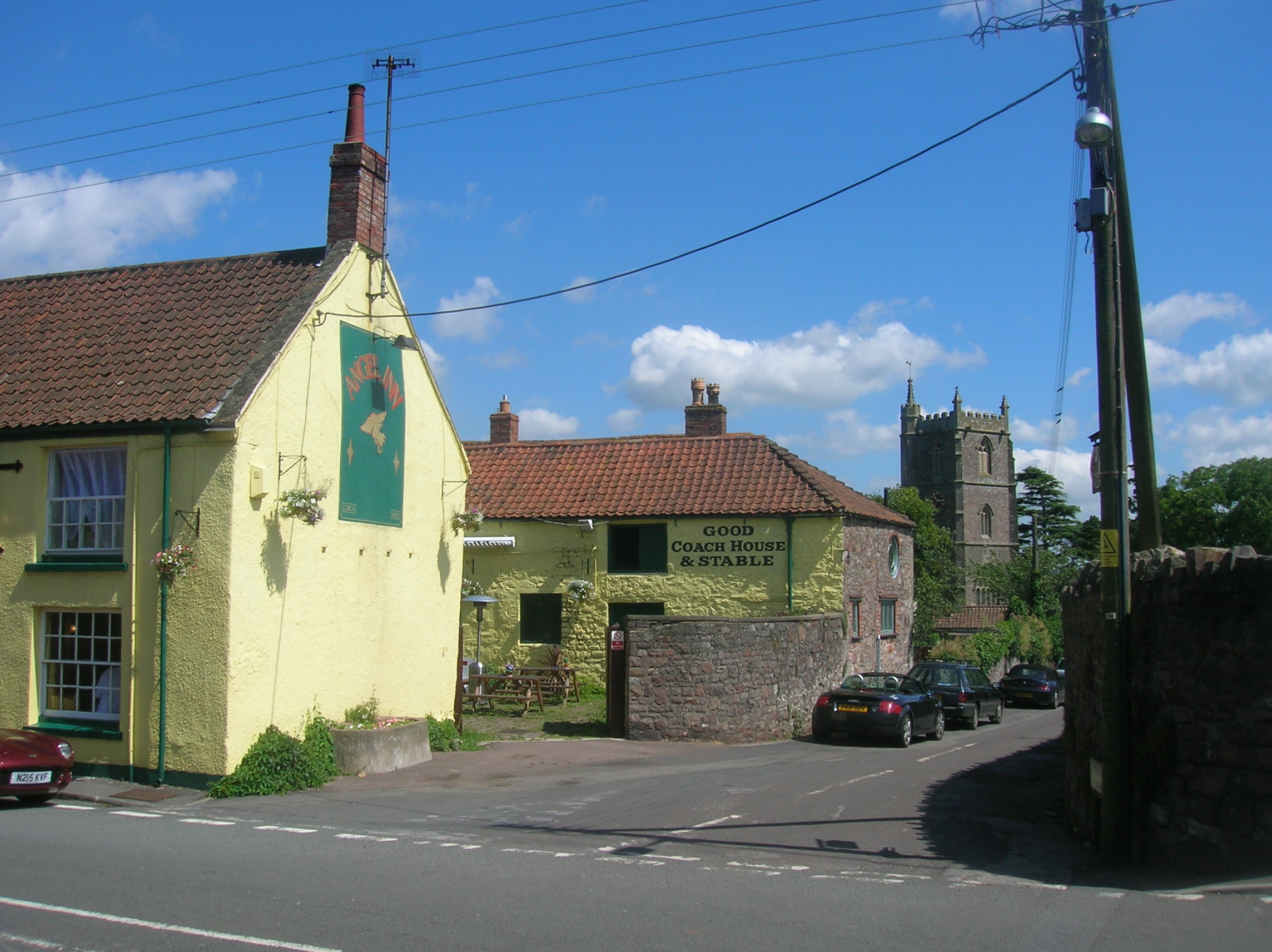
- All Saints church and the Angel Inn, Long Ashton

- Location within Somerset
- Population: 6,044 (2011)
- OS grid reference: ST545705
- Unitary authority: North Somerset
- Ceremonial county: Somerset
- Region: South West
- Country: England
- Sovereign state: United Kingdom
- Post town: BRISTOL
- Postcode district: BS41
- Dialling code: 01275
- Police: Avon and Somerset
- Fire: Avon
- Ambulance: South Western
- UK Parliament: North Somerset

Long Ashton is a village and civil parish in Somerset, England. It falls within the unitary authority of North Somerset and is one of a number of large villages just outside the boundary of city of Bristol urban area. The parish has a population of 6,044. The parish includes the hamlet of Yanley, and the residential area of Leigh Woods (although most of the woods themselves are in the neighbouring parish of Abbots Leigh).

The village is built on the south-facing slopes of a valley running from east to west, and on the old road from Bristol to Weston-super-Mare.

== History ==
Prehistoric and Roman artefacts have been found in the area, at the site of the Gatcombe Roman Settlement, but the village originated in Saxon times. The Domesday Book records it as Estune (the place by the ash tree) and, afterwards, it was granted to Bishop Geoffrey of Coutances. The village is near two waterways being The Longmoor Brook and The Ashton Brook, thus the name Long Ashton.

The parish was part of the hundred of Hartcliffe.

The manor house dates to 1265 and, in the late 15th century shares in the estate were purchased by Richard Amerike (one of the possible sources of the name America). Previously the manor had passed through the hands of the Lyons, Choke and finally Smyth families. By 1603 the Smyths had become the principal landowners in the parish and were lords of Long Ashton for four centuries—the estate finally being sold in 1946. A deserted medieval farmstead and part of a Romano-British field system 400 metres (1,300 ft) north of Fenswood Farm has been identified including three enclosures which are thought to be the foundations of buildings, each surrounded by rubble banks.

The parish church of All Saints dates from about 1380, and the arms of its founder (Thomas de Lyons) are on the outside of the tower. The interior has some fine tombs, and some relatives of the poet Robert Southey are buried in the churchyard.

The other Church, Hebron Church was founded in 1934 by Ernest Dyer, who cycled to the village from Keynsham to run a Sunday School. Many of the people who have grown up in the village passed through this Sunday School.

Since the earliest recorded times, agriculture has been the major occupation of the parish, and there are still several working farms, some just outside the village. The Ashton Court estate provided occupations such as gamekeepers and foresters, and there have been several mills in the parish including a snuff-mill on the Land Yeo at Gatcombe in 1769, however the current building dates from the early 19th century. By 1846 it had been converted to grind mustard, annatto and drugs, but by 1874 was a flour mill. The internal machinery is still in place and the mill has been designated as a Grade II listed building. Kincott Mill had stood since at least the 13th century. By the early 19th century rented out for snuff grinding and in the 1830s a steam engine was installed to power a flour and corn mill. Later it was owned by an iron founder, who made edge tools and other farm implements and installed cast-iron water wheels.

Stone has been quarried for lime burning, as well as for building and road making. There was an iron foundry in the 19th century and coal mines — the Bedminster-Ashton coalfield finally closed in 1924.

The Angel Inn, near the church, is the oldest pub in the village, dating from 1495 and originally being a church-house. There are two other historic pubs in the village, The Bird in Hand and The Miners Rest which are very popular with visitors from Bristol—a horse-drawn bus ran from Redcliffe Street, Bristol to the Bird-in-Hand several times a week in the late 19th century.

The National Fruit and Cider Institute opened at Fenswood on the edge of the village in 1903. It became the Agricultural and Horticultural Research Station in 1912, and was known as Long Ashton Research Station until it was closed in 2003. During the Second World War it developed rose hip syrup and Ribena.

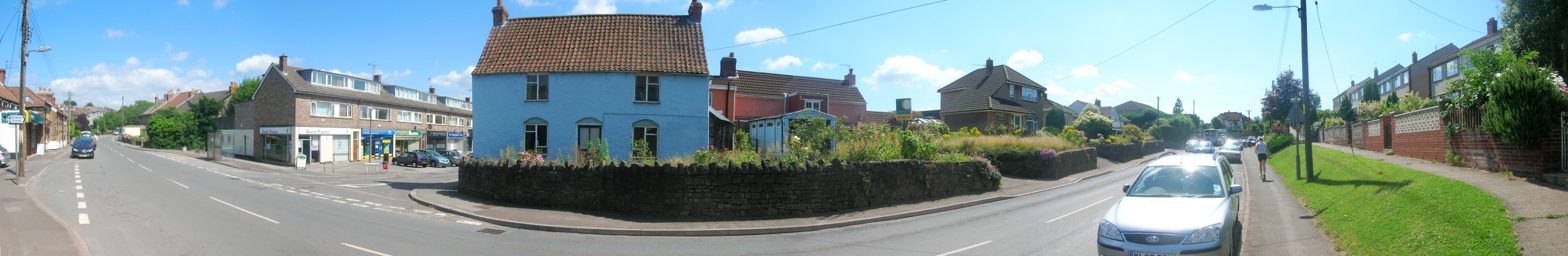
Panorama of eastern Long Ashton from Weston Road

A Parochial School opened in 1818 and moved several times — the current Primary School, called Northleaze, opened in 1867 and moved to new premises in Brook Close in 2006. There have been other schools in the village, including boarding schools for "Young Gentlemen".

Long Ashton railway station was opened by the Great Western Railway in Yanley Lane, where the Bristol to Taunton Line passes below the village, on 12 July 1926 but it was closed on 6 October 1941.

Colonel Reginald Dyer CB (9 October 1864 – 23 July 1927) spent his last two years in Long Ashton. As a temporary brigadier-general he was responsible for the Jallianwala Bagh massacre in Amritsar on 13 April 1919. The massacre was depicted in the 1982 film, Gandhi.

== Governance ==
The parish council has responsibility for local issues, including setting an annual precept (local rate) to cover the council's operating costs and producing annual accounts for public scrutiny. The parish council evaluates local planning applications and works with the local police, district council officers, and neighbourhood watch groups on matters of crime, security, and traffic. The parish council's role also includes initiating projects for the maintenance and repair of parish facilities, such as the village hall or community centre, playing fields and playgrounds, as well as consulting with the district council on the maintenance, repair, and improvement of highways, drainage, footpaths, public transport, and street cleaning. Conservation matters (including trees and listed buildings) and environmental issues are also of interest to the council.

The parish falls within the unitary authority of North Somerset which was created in 1996, as established by the Local Government Act 1992. It provides a single tier of local government with responsibility for almost all local government functions within their area including local planning and building control, local roads, council housing, environmental health, markets and fairs, refuse collection, recycling, cemeteries, crematoria, leisure services, parks, and tourism. They are also responsible for education, social services, libraries, main roads, public transport, Trading Standards, waste disposal and strategic planning, although fire, police and ambulance services are provided jointly with other authorities through the Avon Fire and Rescue Service, Avon and Somerset Constabulary and the South Western Ambulance Service.

North Somerset's area covers part of the ceremonial county of Somerset but it is administered independently of the non-metropolitan county. Its administrative headquarters are in the town hall in Weston-super-Mare. Between 1 April 1974 and 1 April 1996, it was the Woodspring district of the county of Avon. Before 1974 that the parish was part of the Long Ashton Rural District.

The village falls within the 'Wraxall and Long Ashton' electoral ward. The ward starts in the west at Wraxall and proceeds easterly to Long Ashton. The total population of the ward as at the 2011 census was 7,793.

The parish is represented in the House of Commons of the Parliament of the United Kingdom as part of the North Somerset constituency. It elects one Member of Parliament (MP) by the first past the post system of election, currently Sadik Al-Hassan, a member of the Labour Party.

== Cricket ==
Long Ashton Cricket Club plays in Yanley Lane. It runs two Saturday sides as well as a number of junior teams. The team won the Bristol & District Cricket Association League in 1977.

Famous players have included Chris Broad, who went on to become international cricketer of the year. Shane Warne, who was named as one of the five cricketers of the 20th century, played a few games for Long Ashton on tour in Cornwall in the early 1980s. The famous Victorian cricketer W G Grace attended school in Long Ashton.

== Football ==
Long Ashton first team play in the Somerset County League Division 2. The reserve team play in the Bristol and Suburban League Division 2. Their pitch is at Keedwell Hill.

== Golf ==
The golf course at Long Ashton started its life in 1893 as a nine-hole course. However, this was all to change by 1905 when a further addition of land provided the stepping stone to adjoin the second nine holes.

== Target Sport ==
Long Ashton District Rifle Club is located in Cambridge Batch, to the west of Long Ashton village. The current range was constructed in 1964, supporting indoor and outdoor ranges for smallbore target rifle and archery.

== Open spaces ==
Leigh Woods has been built on since 1865, and the land south of Nightingale Valley was fully developed by 1909. The rest has been preserved by gifts of land by the Wills family and is now owned by the National Trust.

The Clifton Suspension Bridge was opened in 1864 and provided an alternative route to Bristol; in 1906, a swing bridge was opened to give access to Hotwells. Traffic continued to grow throughout the 20th century, and a bypass was opened in 1968.

Ashton Court is a large estate that lies at the east end of the village. It was originally owned by the Smyth family until they were forced to donate it to Bristol City Council in lieu of inheritance tax. Ashton Court is host to several festivals each year, including the Bristol International Balloon Fiesta and the scenic landscaped grounds with views of Bristol are widely used by local residents for walking, golf and mountain biking.

Dawsons walk is an area of green space donated to the people of Long Ashton. It has been developed into a circular woodland and countryside walk. Access to the walk is from Lampton Road or from public footpath between Bourton Mead and 40 Long Ashton Road.

The Long Ashton Footpath Users Group have replaced 29 stiles on the public rights of way around the village with kissing gates to create a complete circular walk around the village, accessible to older people and those with mobility problems, although it can be muddy in places. The route, way marked with yellow Village Circular Walk discs, takes in views of the valley, passing through local farms and woodland.

Land next to the recreation ground has been turned into a public space in memory of Andrée Peel (13 February 1905 – 5 March 2010). Known as Agent Rose, she was a member of the French Resistance during World War II and spent her last years in the village. She died peacefully at the Lampton House nursing home on 5 March 2010.

== Notable residents ==
- Ferdinando Gorges (1565–1647) Had legal ownership of coastal Maine, the U.S. State. Died at his home in Long Ashton, and is buried there.
- John Collinson (1757–1793), the Somerset Historian and vicar of Long Ashton.
- Andrée Peel (Agent Rose) World War II French resistance heroine
- Colonel Reginald Dyer (1864-1927), the officer responsible for the Amritsar massacre in India, died in Long Ashton in 1927.
- Sir George Alfred Wills, Baronet of Blagdon (1854–1928) who a member of the Wills tobacco family dynasty, and president of Imperial Tobacco. His residence was at Burwalls.
- Henry Goulstone (1836–1914) who was born in Long Ashton and became an early European immigrant to New Zealand, where he was a financier and magistrate.
- Alfie Jones (1997-) Professional Footballer for Hull City, who grew up in Long Ashton.
