= Charlton House, Wraxall =

Charlton House
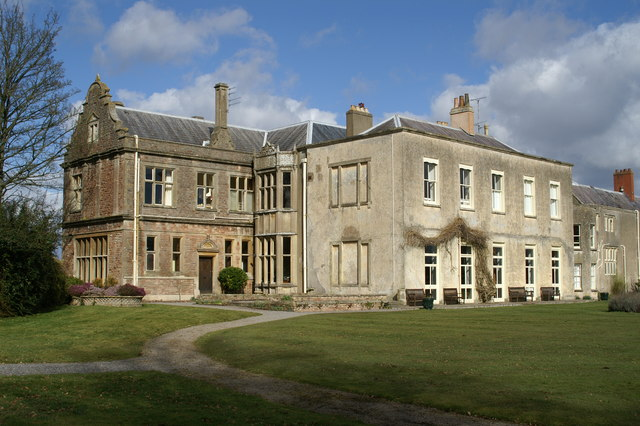

- Location within Somerset
- 51°27′37″N 2°43′52″W
- Location: Wraxall, Somerset, England

History
- Built: Late medieval

Listed Building – Grade II
- Official name: Charlton House
- Designated: 13 October 1952
- Reference no.: 1321023

Charlton House is a historic building in Wraxall, Somerset, England. It is a Grade II listed building.

The original building dates from the late mediaeval period, however it was altered in the early to mid 17th century and further extended between 1877 and 1884. In the mid- late C19th it was the home of Antony Gibbs (1841-1907), son of William Gibbs (1790-1875) of Antony Gibbs & Sons, who had bought the Tyntesfield estate in 1843 and who purchased the neibouring Charlton House for his son in 1855. Antony wasn't part of his father's business, but inherited Tyntesfield when his father died in 1875. In Fertile Fortune by James Miller there is a photograph of the family outside the house in 1908.

Prior to the house being owned by the Gibbs family, it was owned by the Kington family. Thomas Kington Snr (1771-1827) is recorded as being 'of Charlton House' when he wrote his will. His son, Thomas Kington (1796-1857) owned plantations in the West Indies; he received £15,338 for 1342 enslaved people when slavery was abolished across the British Empire in 1834.

The rendered stone three-storey building has a slate roof with a parapet. The hall fireplace dates from the early 17th century as does some of the fabric of the central block however most of the building was added in the 19th century. The fireplace has a gadrooned surround with clustered colonnettes on each side. These finish with caryatids and a moulded cornice. The large overmantel is decorated with the figures of kings and women representing Charity and Justice.

Since 1927 it has housed The Downs School, a preparatory school founded in 1894 (originally in a house overlooking Clifton Down, across the Clifton Suspension Bridge). The current Headteacher of the Downs School is Mrs Debbie Isaachsen. The school takes pupils from its reception class until year three in pre-preparatory school and then from year four to year eight in the preparatory school. At the end of year 8, most pupils feed into other local Bristol schools, such as Clifton College and Bristol Grammar School along with Queen Elizabeth's Hospital and even schools further afield such as schools in Taunton, Millfield and Sherborne. It is set in 60 acres (24 ha) of parkland.

The house was part of the Tyntesfield estate; the associated Charlton Farm was sold in 2002 and is now a residential centre of Children's Hospice South West.
