= Wraxall, Somerset =

Village in Somerset, England

Coordinates: 51.4402°N 2.7280°W

Wraxall
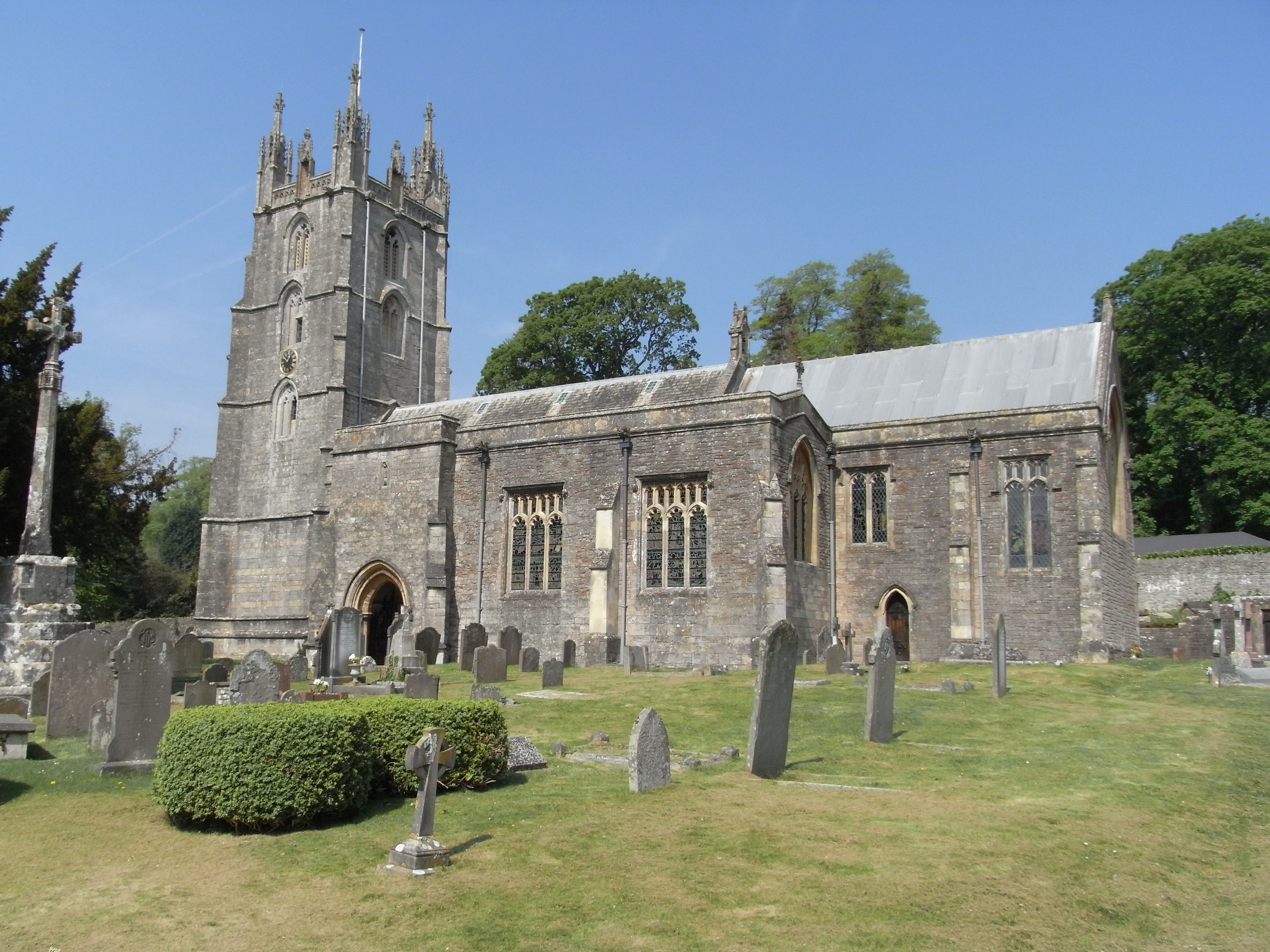
- All Saints' Church, Wraxall

- Location within Somerset
- OS grid reference: ST495715
- Civil parish: Wraxall and Failand
- Unitary authority: North Somerset
- Ceremonial county: Somerset
- Region: South West
- Country: England
- Sovereign state: United Kingdom
- Post town: BRISTOL
- Postcode district: BS48
- Dialling code: 01275
- Police: Avon and Somerset
- Fire: Avon
- Ambulance: South Western
- UK Parliament: North Somerset

Wraxall is a village in North Somerset, England, about 6 miles (10 km) west of Bristol. Until 1811 the parish of the same name also included Nailsea and Flax Bourton. The village is now within the parish of Wraxall and Failand.

== History ==
The origin of the name Wraxall, which is shared with other villages in Somerset, Wiltshire and Dorset, is thought to be "a nook of land frequented by buzzards".

Earthworks of an oval defended settlement, surrounded by a bank and ditch, indicated the site of an Iron Age defended settlement 400 metres (1,300 ft) south of Manor Farm.

Wraxall Court was the original manor house. After the Norman Conquest the Manor belonged to the De Wrokeshale family until it passed to the Moreville and then Gorges family by marriage. The parish of Wraxall was part of the Portbury Hundred. In Victorian times the Ford family lived at the Court. it was taken over by the Admiralty during the Second World War and later became a Hall of Residence for Bristol University.

Earthworks from a deserted medieval settlement, 300 metres (980 ft) east-south-east of Wraxall House, indicate houses, enclosures and possibly a watermill which were occupied in the Middle Ages.

The only waterwheel still operating on the Land Yeo is at Watercress Farm. The 6 feet (1.8 m) diameter wheel, which was built before 1885 and is housed in a small brick building, is used as a water pump. The other mill in the parish of Wraxall operated in the 18th and 19th centuries. It fell out of use by 1885 and was a ruin by 1950. The mill was demolished in 1961 to allow for the road widening and straightening of Wraxall Score. Today the only remains are crumbling walls by the entrance to Wraxall House.

An area known as "The Rocks" stretches north from the Battleaxes to Failand, its many quarries being the source of some of the local building stone (oolitic conglomerate). Failand once had a chapel of ease, but now has the Victorian church of St Bartholomew; the village is relatively modern.

The Battleaxes free house, which was previously known as the Widdicombe Arms, was built in 1838 and is a grade II listed building. It was built originally as the meeting house for the workers at Tyntesfield Estate.

Wraxall Cross Tree, a large elm, used to be found on in the small triangle of land where Wraxall Hill meets with the Bristol Road (B3130). The original tree had become hollow and local children were often seen climbing inside it. It eventually succumbed to Dutch elm disease and was felled in May 1977. Children at Wraxall School were given the day off to see the spectacle of the tree being craned and transported to Watercress Farm where it was burned for a large barbecue. An oak tree has been planted in its place.

A new housing estate, built at the edge of the parish with Nailsea in the mid-1990s, is now referred to as The Elms. Much more housing has been built since then with Nailsea becoming a largely dormitory town for Bristol.

In April 2007 a new children's hospice opened at Charlton Farm, part of the Tyntesfield Estate associated with the medieval Charlton House. Children's Hospice South West provides in-patient palliative care for eight children and their families, plus outpatient and day-care facilities for a number of other children. The opening follows years of fund raising in the Bristol and Somerset area.

== Archaeology ==
In 1950-53 an archaeological dig was undertaken at Tower House Farm towards the lower end of Tower House Lane. A Roman villa was found at Birdcombe Farm. There are other Roman features scattered throughout the valley. Cadbury Camp is located just over 2.5 kilometres (1.6 miles) away.

== Church ==
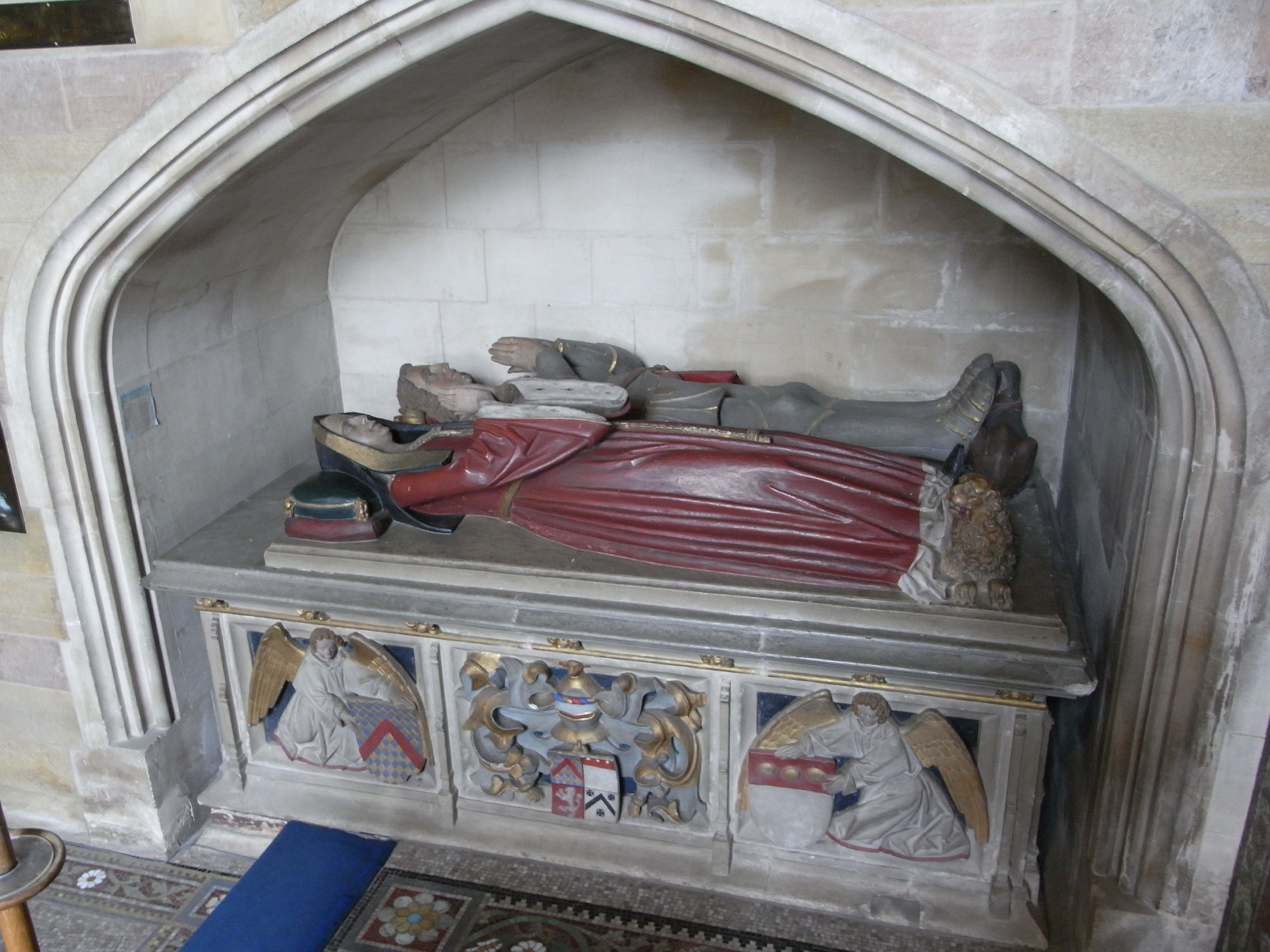
Tomb of Sir Edmond Gorges (d.1512) and his wife Ann Howard, north wall of east end of chancel, Wraxall Church

The Church of England parish church of All Saints was built in the 12th century, with tower, clock and bells being added in later centuries. It has been designated by English Heritage as a Grade I listed building.

There are painted stone figures of Sir Edmond Gorges and his wife in the chancel. The large churchyard contains several monuments to the Tynte family which gave its name to the nearby Tyntesfield Estate. The church tower has a peal of eight bells in the key of E flat. The oldest bell was cast in Chew Stoke in the early 18th century and the heaviest bell (tenor) is just over 1.1 tonnes. The nearby rectory was built in the 17th century.

To the south east of the churchyard, next door to the village blacksmith, Wraxall once had a public house called "Remember Lot's Wife." It was demolished by Colonel George Gibbs, in about 1920, when he gave the lower churchyard to the village as an extension.

== Tyntesfield Estate ==
Two large manor houses were situated on the estate before the estate was split after Baron Wraxall's death in 2001:

Tyntesfield is a Victorian Gothic Revival house which used to be part of a much larger estate. The National Trust bought the house in 2002 after the property gained worldwide interest. A number of celebrities were reportedly interested including Kylie Minogue. The house and some of the grounds are slowly undergoing renovations and restoration, but local trades people have questioned the way in which the Trust is managing the restoration projects.

During the 1940s "Tyntesfield Camp" was built as an American hospital (situated in the pastures of what is now Belmont Estate) with a vast network of centrally-heated hot-water radiators. After the war it was returned to the fields which remain there now.

The lesser known Belmont House is situated about 1 kilometre (0.62 mi) to the east. It contains a real tennis court.

== Schools ==
A dame school was recorded as early as 1801 and several schools followed, the present one being built in 1856. This is the current school, Wraxall Church of England (VA) School, which educates children between the ages of five and twelve years. Across the road from this was the village blacksmith, and nearby were the stocks and whipping post, for centuries the site of the annual "Stumps Fair". This area is locally referred to as Wraxall Cross Tree.

The old Boys' School was located just over 350 metres (380 yd) towards Bristol. The school was built in 1856 on land donated by Sir G Smyth with building expenses donated by William Gibbs. The school closed in 1938, and became a private residence, which it has remained ever since.

Another school in the village is the private Downs Preparatory School, which occupies Charlton House.

== Amenities and annual events ==
=== Swimming pool ===
On the southern side of the B3130 road, opposite the old American Hospital, a natural spring was captured to create a cold bathing pond, in around 1890. The construction comprises two pools of concrete, undressed and dressed natural stone. The small north pool is about two feet deep and feeds the southern pool which is about five feet deep. The southern pool has an iron handrail. The pool, which has not been used for many decades, has now fallen into disrepair. The south pool is mostly full of organic matter. It is referred to by the ordnance survey as 'Bathing Pond Wood.'

=== Noah's Ark Zoo ===
A tourist attraction in the village is the Noah's Ark Zoo Farm. This zoo has a large collection of animals and offers hands-on experience and children's play areas. The zoo promotes creationism. It has been the subject of animal cruelty allegations on more than one occasion, and now has to undergo six-monthly inspections by an independent veterinary surgeon.

=== North Somerset Show ===
On May Day Bank Holiday the annual North Somerset Show agricultural fair is held at the North Somerset Showground. The show was formed in 1840 from the North Somerset Ploughing Society and its purpose was to further agricultural development by communicating agricultural issues and providing a showpiece to the local, general public. The event was previously held at Ashton Court, until the mid-1990s, when the show committee moved it to its current location.

== Transport ==
The nearest railway station is Nailsea and Backwell 2 miles (3 km) to the south. The nearest airport is Bristol Airport.

The 354 bus serves Bristol Road, while the 361 service carries passengers along the Clevedon Road. Both services are operated by First West of England.
