= Barrow Court =

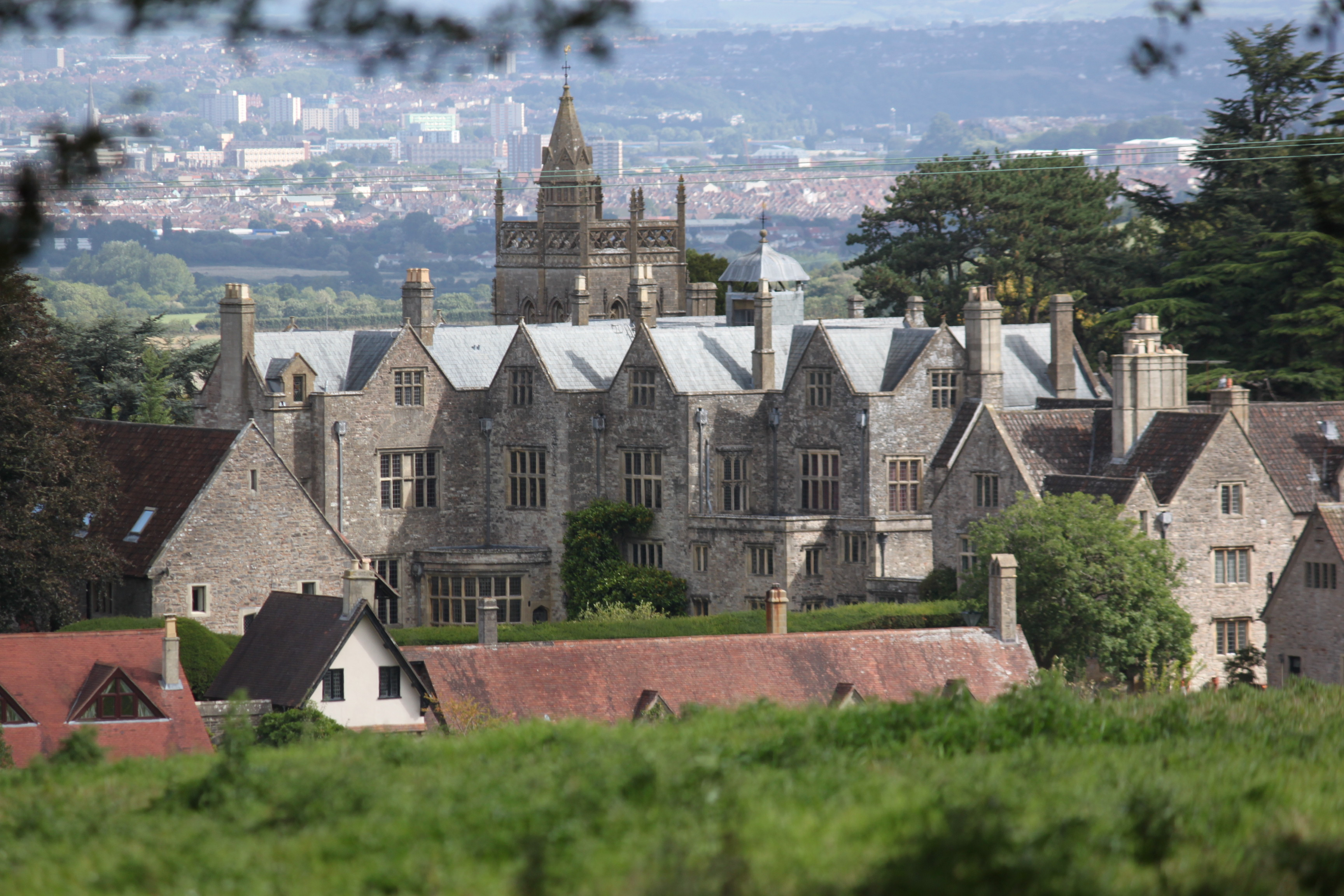

- Location within Somerset
- 51°24′41″N 2°41′50″W
- Location: Barrow Gurney, Somerset, England

Listed Building – Grade II*
- Designated: 13 October 1952
- Reference no.: 1311901

Barrow Court is a manor house in Barrow Gurney, Somerset, England. The site was originally Barrow Gurney Nunnery and was rebuilt in the 16th and 19th centuries. It has been designated as a Grade II* listed building.

== History ==
The Benedictine nunnery was founded in 1212 by one of the Fitz-Hardinges (or Fitzhardinge), who had been granted the Lordship of the Manor by William Rufus. After the Dissolution of the Monasteries in 1536 the area and buildings were granted by Henry VIII to John Drew, of Bristol, who converted it into a private mansion, renamed Barrow Court. The house is closely attached to the original priory Church of St Mary And St Edward.

The original building was converted into a country house in around 1538, largely rebuilt in 1545, and further altered and extended in around 1602 by its owner Dr Francis James into its current E shape, which is the oldest part to survive. It was sold in 1659 to William Gore, in whose family it was passed down until 1881 when it was bought by Anthony Gibbs, son of William Gibbs of Tyntesfield, who sold it to his brother Henry Martin Gibbs. He largely rebuilt the Jacobean house and the church.

During the Second World War it was used as a military hospital. It became a college of education from 1949 to 1976 but remained in the Gibbs family ownership until they sold it in 1976. It was then divided into several separate dwellings.

On the west of the main house is a tithe barn that dates from the 14th century but has now been turned into a house.

== Gardens ==
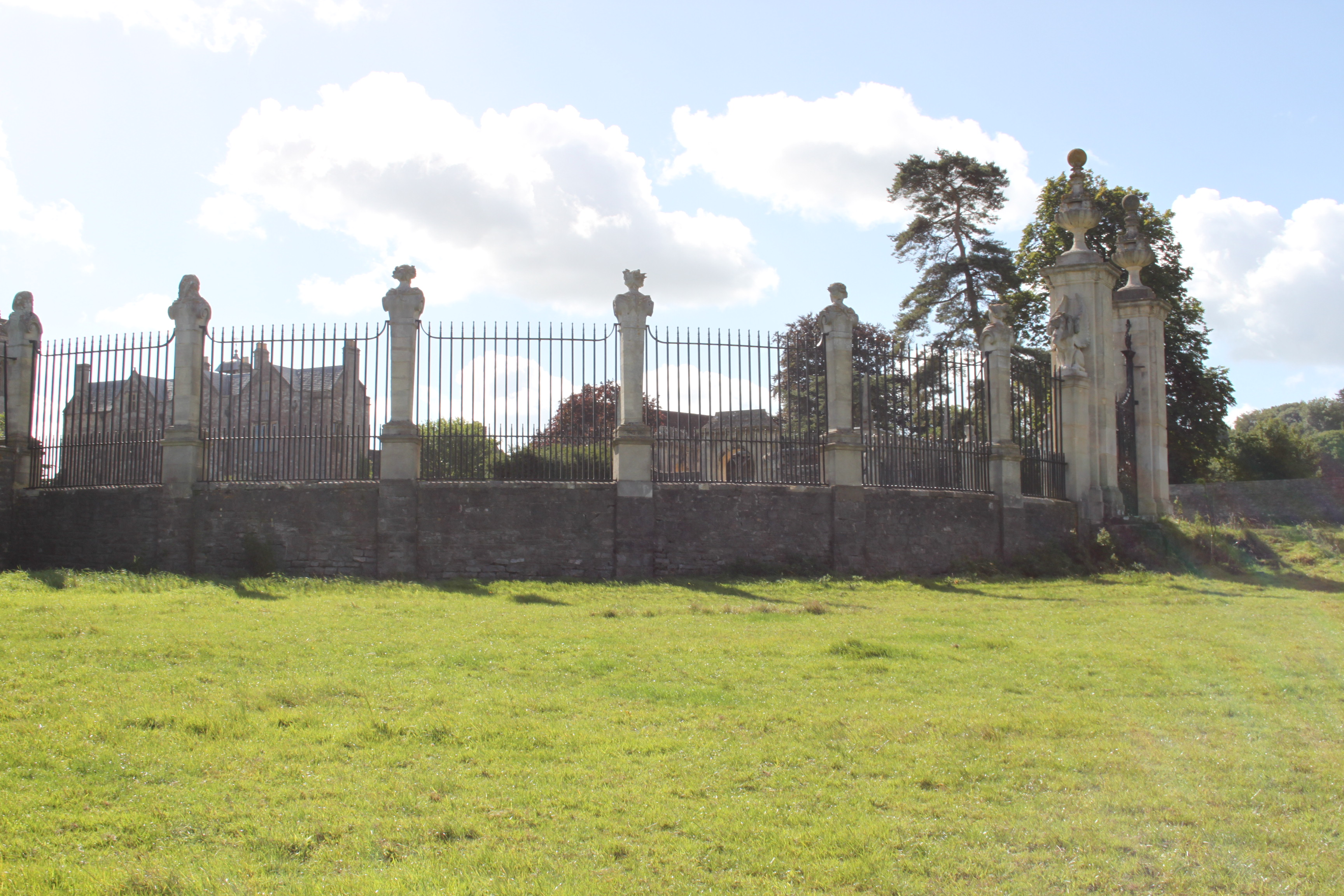
Gatepiers, gates and series of twelve pillars known as the twelve months of the year

The house is surrounded by 6 hectares (15 acres) of formal gardens and a more extensive area, around 60 hectares (150 acres), of parkland, which held a medieval deer park. In 1890 Inigo Thomas carried out extensive work. building gazebos, a balustraded garden wall and walled courts. In 1890 he added a set of gates and a wall with twelve pillars known as the twelve months of the year. They support sculptures by Alfred Drury representing the "daughters of the year", with January being a young girl at the northern end along to an elderly matriarch representing December at the south, each with flowers suitable to the particular month.

The lily pond with its accompanying pedestals and urns date from the same time, along with other ornamental steps, walls, vases, a sundial, and a mock temple.
