= Barrow Gurney Nunnery =

Nunnery in Somerset, England

Coordinates: 51.4073°N 2.6748°W

- Interactive map of Barrow Gurney Nunnery

Monastery information
- Order: Benedictine
- Established: c. 1200
- Disestablished: 1536

Site
- Location: Barrow Gurney, Somerset, England
- Grid reference: ST532677

Barrow Gurney Nunnery shown within Somerset
(grid reference ST532677)

Barrow Gurney Nunnery (also called Minchin Barrow) was established around 1200 in Barrow Gurney Somerset, England.

The Benedictine convent was founded by one of the Fitz-Hardinges (or Fitzhardinge), and in 1212, was left 10 marks in the will of Hugh de Wells. The nunnery also received a pension on the church of Twerton by the time of the Taxatio in 1291. Several other donations of money and land had been received by the Valor of 1535 when the property was assessed as worth £29 6s. 8½d. on which there were charges of £5 12s. 4¾d., leaving a clear value of £23 14s. 3¾d.

The nunnery was still poor and by 1398 had transferred from the Diocese of Wells to the Diocese of Llandaff.

At the dissolution of the monasteries in 1536 its value was £31. The area and buildings were granted by Henry VIII to John Drew, of Bristol, who converted it into a private mansion, renamed Barrow Court.
