= Collier and Plucknett =

Collier and Plucknett were a Warwick, England based Victorian-era furniture maker, best known for their Gothic Revival pieces.

James Plucknett formed a partnership with Frederick Collier in the 1860s, with a showroom in Leamington Spa, and workshops in Warwick where Ambrose Heal was an apprentice. The firm advertised themselves as:

Collier and Plucknett: upholsterers, cabinet-makers and decorators by appointment to Her Majesty, and Manufacturers of rich carved furniture in the peculiar styles characteristic of the Gothic, Tudor and Elizabethan ages

From adverts in trade directories the firm gained a wider reputation across the United Kingdom, with national commissions supplementing work from local families. Their best known works were for William Gibbs, who commissioned John Norton to remodel his country house, Tyntesfield. William Cubitt & Co. were the sub-contracted builders, whose foreman was George Plucknett, a relative of James Plucknett. Today, Tyntesfield is a National Trust property, and as well as items of furniture visitors can view the fully fitted Collier and Plucknett bathroom of Matilda Blanche Gibbs.

After Collier retired and the old firm was dissolved in January 1880, Plucknett went into partnership with James Steevens and they traded as Plucknett and Steevens. The partnership lasted six years and included the 1884 commission for the Town Hall in Leamington Spa. Plucknett traded independently from 1886 and in 1892 provided the furnishings for The Royal Pavilion at the Royal Agricultural Show.

The firm ceased trading in 1908 and the remaining stock was auctioned off.
