= Plucknett =

Plucknett may refer to:

- Haselbury Plucknett, a village in Somerset, England
- Preston Plucknett, a former village in Somerset, England

== People ==
- Ben Plucknett (1954–2002), U.S. athlete
- Theodore Plucknett (1897–1965), British legal historian
- Victoria Plucknett, Welsh actress

== See also ==
- Collier and Plucknett, an England Victorian-era furniture maker
