= Church of St Mary and St Peter, Tidenham =

Church in Gloucester, England

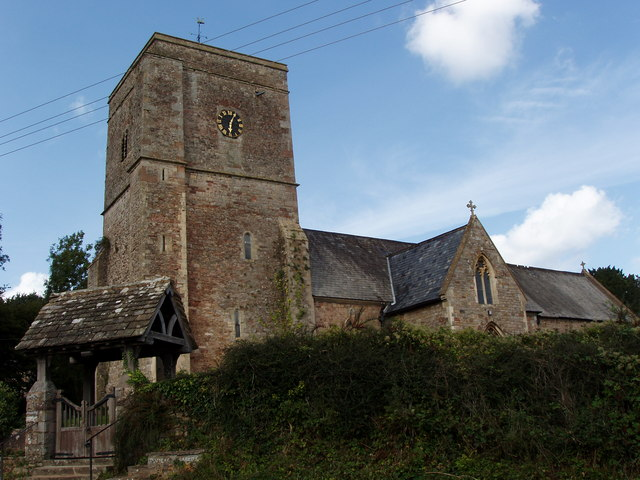
- "Beautifully sited, with splendid views"

- Location in Gloucestershire
- 51.6597°N 2.6434°W
- Location: Tidenham, Gloucestershire
- Country: England
- Denomination: Church of England
- Website: Tidenham Parish Church

History
- Status: parish church
- Dedication: St Mary and Saint Peter

Architecture
- Functional status: Active
- Heritage designation: Grade II* listed
- Designated: 7 August 1954

Specifications
- Materials: rubble masonry

Administration
- Province: Canterbury
- Diocese: Diocese of Gloucester
- Parish: Tidenham with Beachley and Lancaut

Clergy
- Vicar: Revd David Treharne

The Church of St Mary and St Peter, Tidenham, is a parish church of the Diocese of Gloucester, England. It dates from the 13th and 14th centuries, and was extensively restored by John Norton in 1858. It is a Grade II* listed building and remains an active parish church.

== History ==
The church dates from the 13th and 14th centuries. The west tower is the earliest remaining part, dating from the early 13th century. Much of the rest, including most of the windows, is of the 14th century. In 1858, a restoration was undertaken by John Norton. (Note: John Norton's best known work is his reconstruction of Tyntesfield, also in Gloucestershire.) David Verey and Alan Brooks, in their revised 2002 volume, Gloucestershire 2: The Vale and the Forest of Dean, in the Pevsner Buildings of England series, called the restoration "drastic" while Historic England describes it as "extensive".

Declining attendance and the lack of modern facilities, in particular a car park, threatened the ongoing viability of the church in the early 21st century. However, it remains an active parish church as of June 2021.

== Architecture and description ==
Verey and Brooks note the church's favourable situation, "beautifully sited, with splendid views across the Severn Estuary". The building comprises a large west tower, nave, chancel, vestry, aisle and porch. The building material is Red sandstone rubble.

=== Listing designations ===
The church has a Grade II* listing designation. In addition, the churchyard contains a large number of Grade II listed monuments including four commemorating members of the Webley family; one to Francis and Dorothy Seaborne and one to the Madocke family; one each to Mary Smith, Henry Jones, William Humpfrey, James Woodhouse, and Richard Jenkins; and three to unidentified persons.

== Sources ==
- Verey, David; Brooks, Alan (2002) [1970]. Gloucestershire 2: The Vale and the Forest of Dean. The Buildings of England. Yale University Press. ISBN 0-300-09733-6.
