= Ambrose Heal =

British businessman (1872–1959)

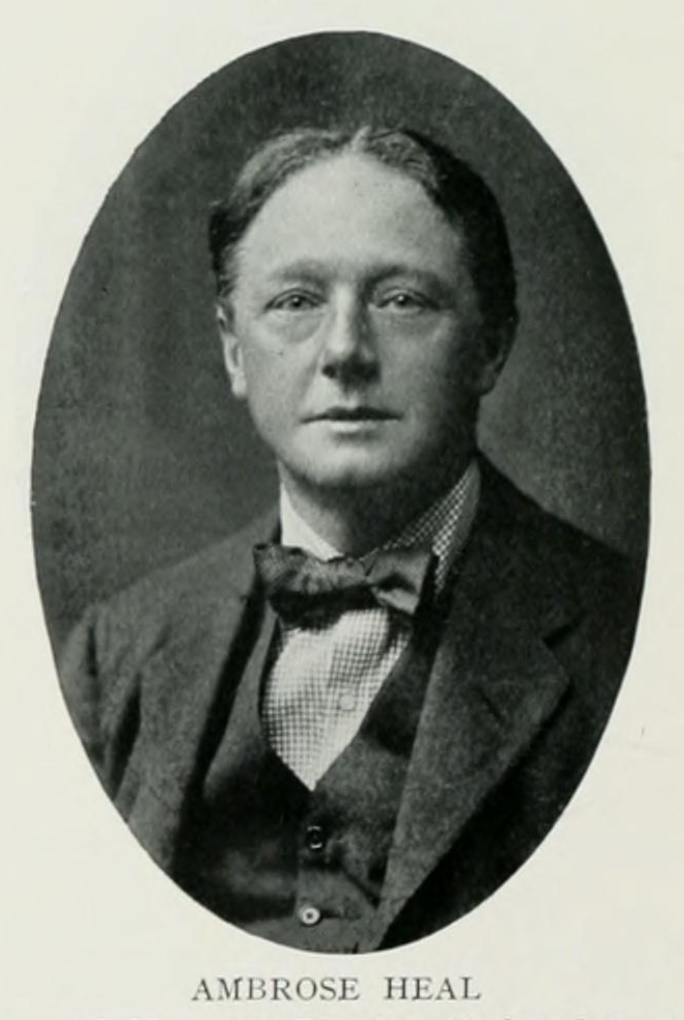
- Photographic portrait of Ambrose Heal
- Born: Ambrose Heal; 3 September 1872; Crouch End, London
- Died: 15 November 1959 (aged 87); Beaconsfield, Buckinghamshire, England
- Occupations: Furniture designer, businessman
- Spouse(s): (1) Alice Rose Rippingille (2) Edith Florence Digby Todhunter

Ambrose Heal (3 September 1872 – 15 November 1959) was an English furniture designer and businessman in the first half of the 20th century. He served as the chairman of Heal's (then called Heal & Son) from 1913 to 1953.

== Early life ==
Heal was born on 3 September 1872 in Crouch End, London, the eldest son of Ambrose Heal and Emily Maria Stephenson. His great-grandfather, John Harris Heal, founded the Heal's furniture manufacturing and retail business. He attended Marlborough College before serving a two-year apprenticeship to cabinetmakers James Plucknett in Warwick. This was followed by six months working for Graham and Biddle, furnishers, of London's Oxford Street.

== Career ==
In 1893 he joined Heal & Son, working in the bedding factory, but in the mid-1890s he began designing simple, sturdy furniture, often in plain oak (in contrast to Heals' standard "Queen Anne" and "Old English" styles). Although initially not popular with sales staff – who called them "prison furniture" – his designs appeared at exhibitions of the Arts and Crafts Exhibition Society, and soon became so successful that prejudices were overcome. Heal was also a member of the Art Workers Guild. He continued to exhibit special pieces at Arts and Crafts exhibitions for more than thirty years, but his most significant contribution was to make simpler, well-designed, well-made furniture available to a broader middle-class public.

Undoubtedly influenced by the ideas of John Ruskin and William Morris, he nonetheless took advantage of machinery where appropriate. His simple, no-frills designs, created around 1905, appealed particularly to the inhabitants of the new Garden Cities and Suburbs. He had already patented (with Hamilton Temple Smith) a unit furniture system in 1915. That same year, he became a founding member of the Design and Industries Association, which campaigned for "Fitness for Purpose" in industrial production.

In 1913, on the death of his father, he was elected chairman of Heals, using this position to champion artistic design within furniture manufacture and marketing. In 1933, he was knighted for raising standards of design, and in 1939 was elected to the Faculty of Royal Designers for Industry. The Royal Society of Arts awarded him the Albert Gold Medal for services to industrial design in 1954.

Although Heals continued to produce beds and mattresses as its staple, Heal diversified its range to include ceramics, glass, and textiles, as well as products in Art Deco style. He established an art gallery at the Tottenham Court Road premises showing works by Picasso, Wyndham Lewis and Modigliani. Artists such as Claud Lovat Fraser designed the company's posters, and its catalogues contained essays by influential art critics. The overall effect was to promote Heals as an iconic brand.

Heal's influence over the company diminished in the mid-1930s, when one of his sons became managing director. Although considering retirement, he stayed as chairman during World War II, finally retiring in 1953. Under his leadership sales of the Heal business grew from £75,000 p.a. in 1900 to in excess of £300,000 in the mid-1930s.

Fellow designer Gordon Russell said of Heal's legacy,

He was perhaps the only man in the retail trade of that time who had any real interest in and knowledge of design and, like most pioneers, he was sniped at from all quarters. By many craftsman he was distrusted because he was in charge of an efficient business. By most businessman he was regarded as a long hair chap with odd notions.... Today, when it has become possible to get well designed furniture in many shops, it is difficult to realise what a revolution Heal pioneered.

== Personal life ==
Heal was married twice. On 26 February 1895, he married Alice Rose Rippingille and they moved to Pinner, Middlesex. In 1896, their son Cecil was born. After Alice's death from cancer in 1901, Heal remarried on 20 August 1904 to Edith Florence Digby Todhunter (d. 1946). Apart from work interests, he collected London historical ephemera, mainly from the 17th and 18th centuries, including records of tradesmen, goldsmiths, calligraphers, signboards and furniture makers. His collection of trade-cards is preserved at the British Museum. He was the author of five books: London Tradesmen's Cards of the XVIII Century (1925), The English Writing Masters and their Copy Books (1931), The London Goldsmiths (1935), Signboards of Old London Shops (1947), The London Furniture Makers (1953). In addition The Records of the Heal Family was printed for private circulation. He contributed articles on a variety of topics in connection with his historical research to publications such as The Connoisseur and Country Life.

== Legacy ==
Heal died on 15 November 1959 in Beaconsfield. His Times obituary describes him as "one of the great artists and craftsmen of his time". The Oxford Dictionary of National Biography article by Alan Crawford describes this as "very wide of the mark" and accounts of his life and work as prone to hagiography, "but it showed what a powerful image he had created for his shop, and thus for himself". An English Heritage blue plaque commemorating Heal was placed at The Fives Court on Moss Lane in Pinner, North London, in 2013.
