= Tyntesfield =

Country house in North Somerset, England

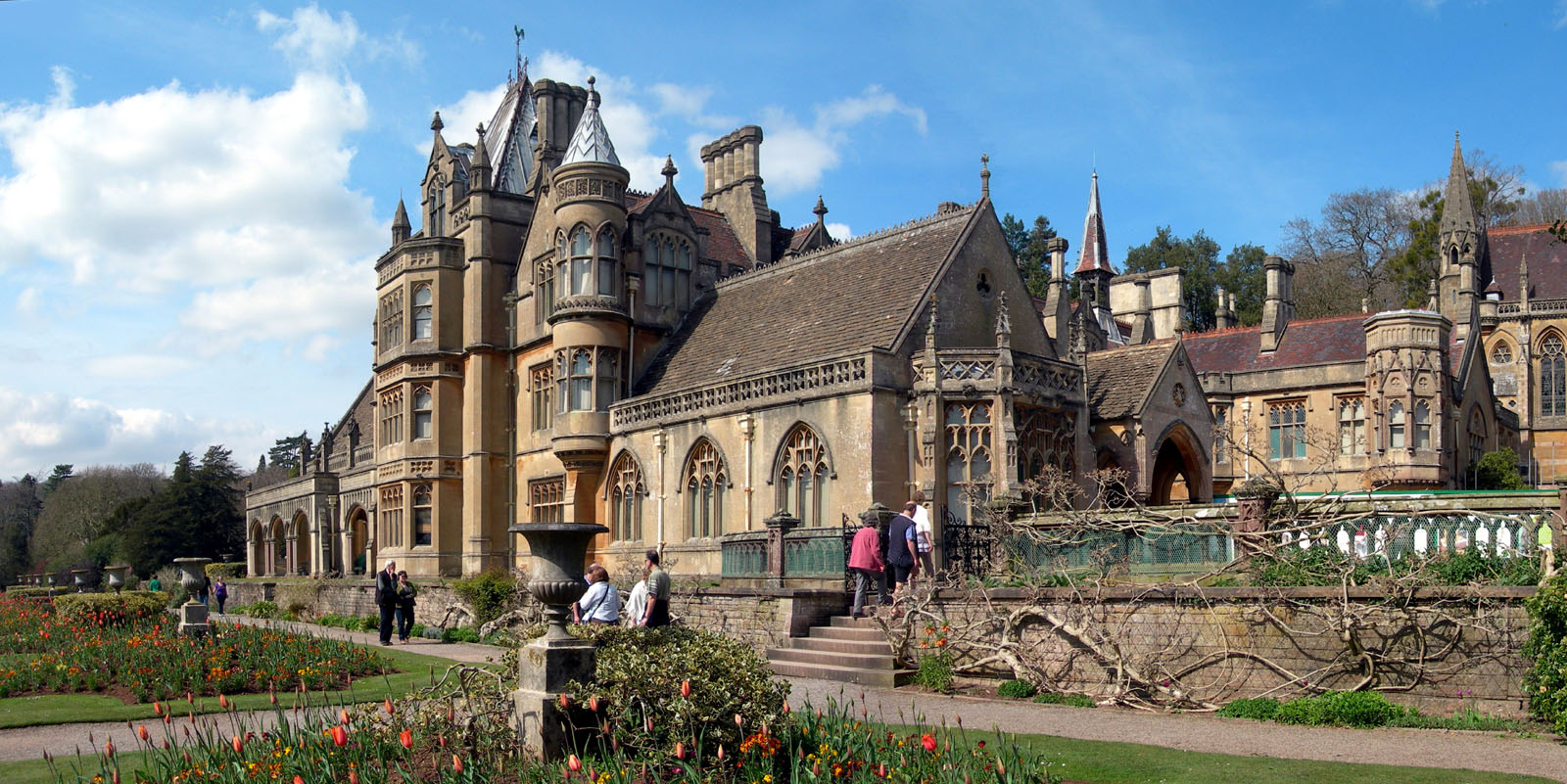
- Tyntesfield, south side

- Location within Somerset
- Former names: Tyntes Place

General information
- Type: Country House
- Architectural style: Gothic Revival
- Location: Wraxall, North Somerset, England
- Coordinates: 51°26′26″N 02°42′42″W
- Completed: 1863
- Cost: £70,000
- Client: William Gibbs
- Owner: National Trust

Dimensions
- Other dimensions: 106 rooms 26 main bedrooms, 43 in total including servants quarters

Technical details
- Floor area: 40,000 sq ft (3,700 m^{2})

Design and construction
- Architects: John Norton (Main house); Henry Woodyer (Internal adjustments); Arthur Blomfield (Chapel)
- Other designers: Powell; Wooldridge; Salviati; Hart, Son, Peard and Co.; Collier and Plucknett
- Main contractor: William Cubitt & Co.
- Designations: Grade I listed

Website
- Tyntesfield @ National Trust

Tyntesfield (TINTS-feeld) is a Victorian Gothic Revival country house and estate near Wraxall, North Somerset, England. The house is a Grade I listed building named after the Tynte baronets, who had owned estates in the area since about 1500. The location was formerly that of a 16th-century hunting lodge, which was used as a farmhouse until the early 19th century. In the 1830s a Georgian mansion was built on the site, which was bought by English businessman William Gibbs, whose huge fortune came from guano used as fertilizer. In the 1860s Gibbs had the house significantly expanded and remodelled; a chapel was added in the 1870s. The Gibbs family owned the house until the death of Richard Gibbs, 2nd Baron Wraxall in 2001.

Tyntesfield was purchased by the National Trust in June 2002, after a fundraising campaign to prevent it being sold to private interests and ensure it would be open to the public. The house was opened to visitors for the first time just 10 weeks after the acquisition, and as more rooms are restored they are added to the tour.

The mansion was visited by 356,766 people in 2019.

== History ==
=== Background ===
The land on which the house and its estate were developed was originally part of the Tynte family estate. The family had lived in the area since the 1500s, but their primary residence was Halswell House in Goathurst, near Bridgwater.

By the late 1700s, John Tynte owned what is now the Tyntesfield estate; at that time the house was approached by an avenue of elm trees, planted after they were bequeathed in the 1678 will of Sir Charles Harbord (1596–1679) to the people of Wraxall in memory of two boys he had apprenticed from the village. The Tyntes had originally lived on the estate, but by the early 1800s, John had made Chelvey Court in Brockley his principal residence. Tyntes Place was downgraded to a farmhouse and leased to John Vowles. In 1813, George Penrose Seymour of the adjoining Belmont estate purchased the property and gave it to his son, the Rev. George Turner Seymour. He in turn built a new Georgian mansion on the site of the former Saddler's Tenement, and demolished the old farmhouse. Further remodelling was undertaken by Robert Newton of Nailsea in Somerset.

=== Purchase by the Gibbs family ===
In 1843, the property was bought by businessman William Gibbs, who made his fortune in the family business, Antony Gibbs & Sons. From 1847 the firm had an effective monopoly in the import and marketing to Europe and North America of guano from Peru as a fertilizer. This was mined by indentured Chinese labour on the Chincha Islands in conditions which the Peruvian government acknowledged in 1856 had degenerated "into a kind of Negro slave trade". The firm's profits from this trade were such that William Gibbs became the richest non-noble man in England.

Throughout his life, William Gibbs and his wife Matilda Blanche Crawley-Boevey (known as Blanche), principally lived in London, for the greater part of his marriage at 16 Hyde Park Gardens, which the family owned until Blanche's death. But as he travelled regularly on business to the Port of Bristol he required a residence in the area; thus it was, in 1843, he came to buy Tyntes Place, which he subsequently renamed Tyntesfield. Within a few years of making his purchase, Gibbs began a major programme of rebuilding and enlarging of the mansion.

The architectural style selected for the rebuilding was a loose Gothic combining many forms and reinventions of the medieval style. The choice of Gothic was influenced by William and Blanche Gibb's Anglo-Catholic beliefs as followers of the Oxford Movement. This wing of the Anglican Church advocated the view set out in the architect Augustus Pugin's 1836 book Contrasts, which argued for the revival of the medieval Gothic style, and "a return to the faith and the social structures of the Middle Ages". The Oxford Movement, of which both Pugin and Gibbs were disciples, later took this philosophy a step further and claimed that the Gothic style was the only architecture suitable for Christian worship. Thus it became a symbolic display of Christian beliefs and lifestyle, and was embraced by devout Victorians such as Gibbs. The completion of the mansion's chapel further accentuated the building's medieval monastical air so beloved by the Oxford Movement's devotees. When completed, the ecclesiastical design was reinforced by a dominating square tower with a steeply pitched roof adorned by four tourelles, which was demolished in 1935.

=== Redevelopment ===
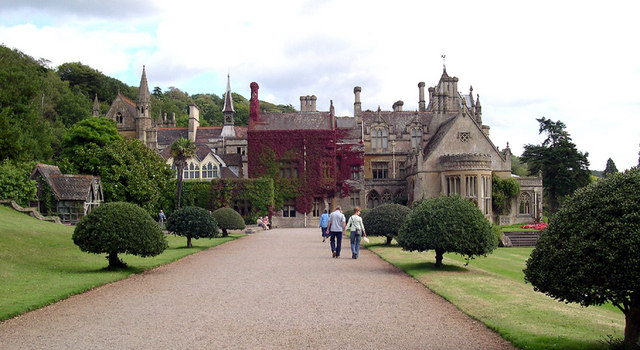
View of the approach to the house from the west via the visitors centre, effectively to the rear of the property. Architect John Norton designed an irregular roof to emphasise the asymmetrical design. This picture was taken in September 2005, before the restoration of the roof and its distinct diaper-pattern.

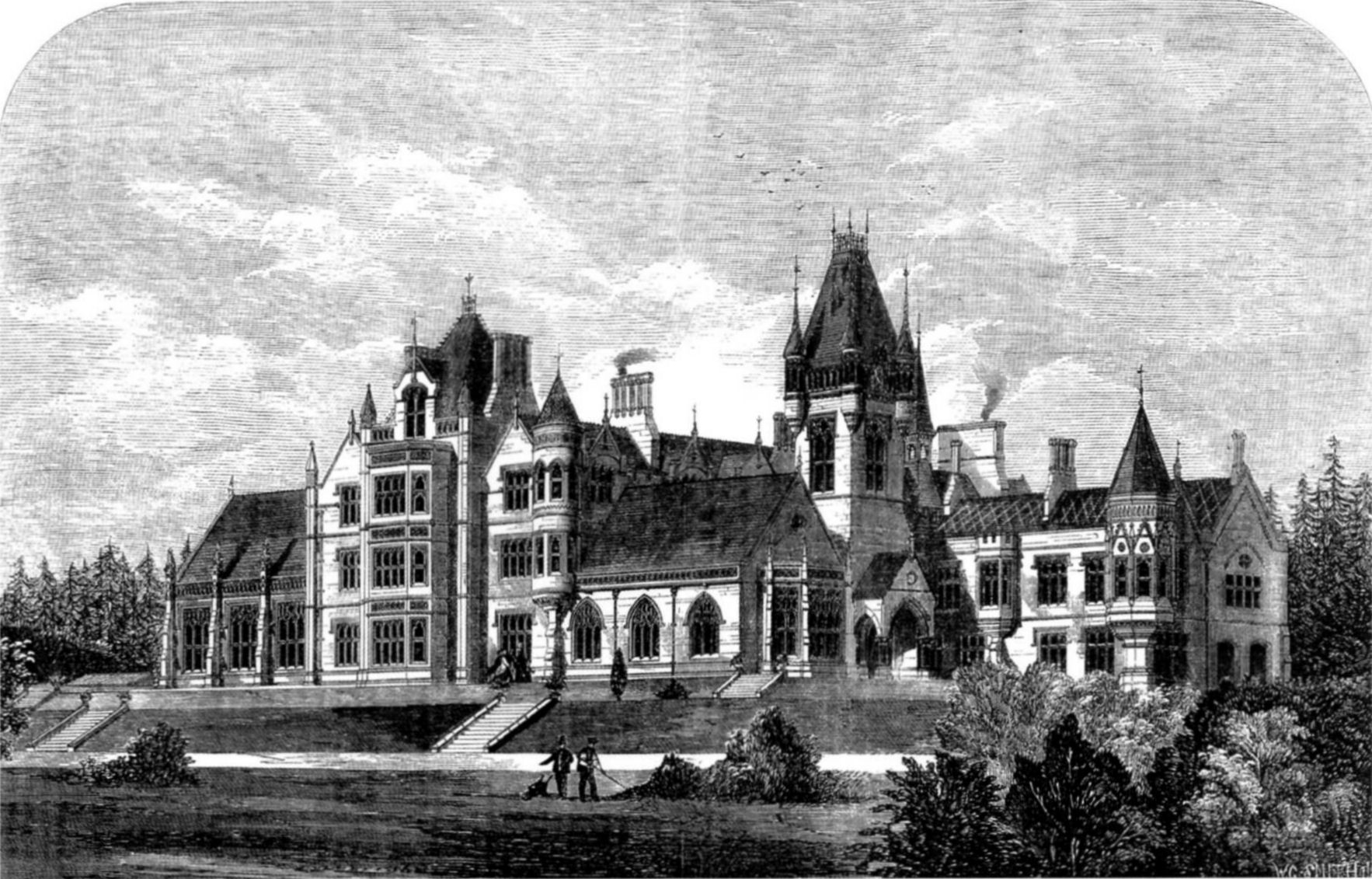
Image of Tyntesfield in an 1866 edition of The Builder magazine (the central clock tower shown was demolished in 1935 at the decision of Lady Wraxall, owing to dry rot)

In 1854 William Gibbs commissioned John Gregory Crace, an interior decorator he was already using elsewhere, to redesign and decorate the principal rooms at Tyntesfield. These new designs included gilded panelling, woodwork, moulding and chimneypieces all in the Gothic style.

Rebuilding work did not begin in earnest until 1863, when William Gibbs had the property substantially remodelled in a Gothic Revival style. William Cubitt & Co. were the builders and John Norton was the architect. Norton's design enveloped the original house. He added an extra floor, two new wings and towers. Norton emphasised the importance of architectural continuity in restoration and rebuilding relating to several historical periods. As a result, while some walls remained plain, others were adorned with Gothic and naturalistic carvings to fit in with the previous architectural styles.

==== Design ====
The house is built of two types of Bath stone, and is highly picturesque, bristling with turrets and possessing an elaborate roof. The combined effect of the architecture and chosen materials has been described by journalist Sir Simon Jenkins as "severe". During restoration, stonemasons either conserved or, on occasion, copy-carved new sections, carving new mouldings to replace standard architectural elements that formed the weathering, as well as repointing most of the miles of lime pointing. All stone was accurately matched to the original, with Veyzeys quarry near Tetbury providing Cotswold oolitic limestone. The house, which includes the servants' wing and the chapel, was made a Grade II* listed building in 1973, and has since been upgraded to Grade I.

The front (facing east over the gardens towards Backwell Hill) and north (entrance courtyard) are faced in one shade of ochreous Bath Stone, while the south (rear), which is mainly allocated to the service area and servants quarters, is faced in cheaper red-tinged Draycott marble rubble, and has some plastered finishes. All façades have many Gothic main windows, Tudor oriel windows, chimneys and attic dormers. Norton topped the design with an irregular roof, its various pitches and gables emphasising the building's asymmetrical architecture. The final external addition was a huge ironwork conservatory by Hart, Son, Peard and Co. to the rear. The result was described by novelist Charlotte Mary Yonge, a cousin of Blanche Gibbs, as "like a church in spirit".

The interiors were also in the Gothic style. Crace was again engaged to remodel the interiors, in some places extending or adapting his initial works, in others providing new schemes. Other notable features of the house are glass by James Powell and Harry Ellis Wooldridge, ironwork by Hart, Son, Peard and Co. and mosaics by Salviati. George Plucknett was Cubitt's foreman, who was related to James Plunkett of Collier and Plucknett, furniture makers of Warwick. The result was that Gibbs ordered a number of specially commissioned pieces from the firm, including a fully fitted bathroom for his wife. All of these fine pieces of craftsmanship were added to by Gibb's expanding collection of artworks.

While the reconstruction on the house was being undertaken, William Gibbs had rented Mamhead Park in Devon. The total cost of redevelopment to create a house with 23 main bedrooms and 47 in total including servants' accommodation came to £70,000 (equivalent to £7,600,000 in 2025). The sum was equivalent to 18 months' gross profit from all of Gibbs's business interests. After completion of the main building works, Gibbs created more cash by selling shares in Antony Gibbs & Sons to his nephew Henry Hucks Gibbs (later Lord Aldenham), which enabled him to purchase two adjoining properties – including Belmont to the east from his nephew George Lewis Monck Gibbs – to create a farming estate, founded on dairy production and forestry management. Added to further by later land purchases, at its peak the Tyntesfield estate spanned over 6,000 acres (2,400 ha), encompassing 1,000 acres (400 ha) of forest, from Portishead in the north to south of the valley in which the main house lay. The house and estate employed more than 500 workers.

=== Chapel ===
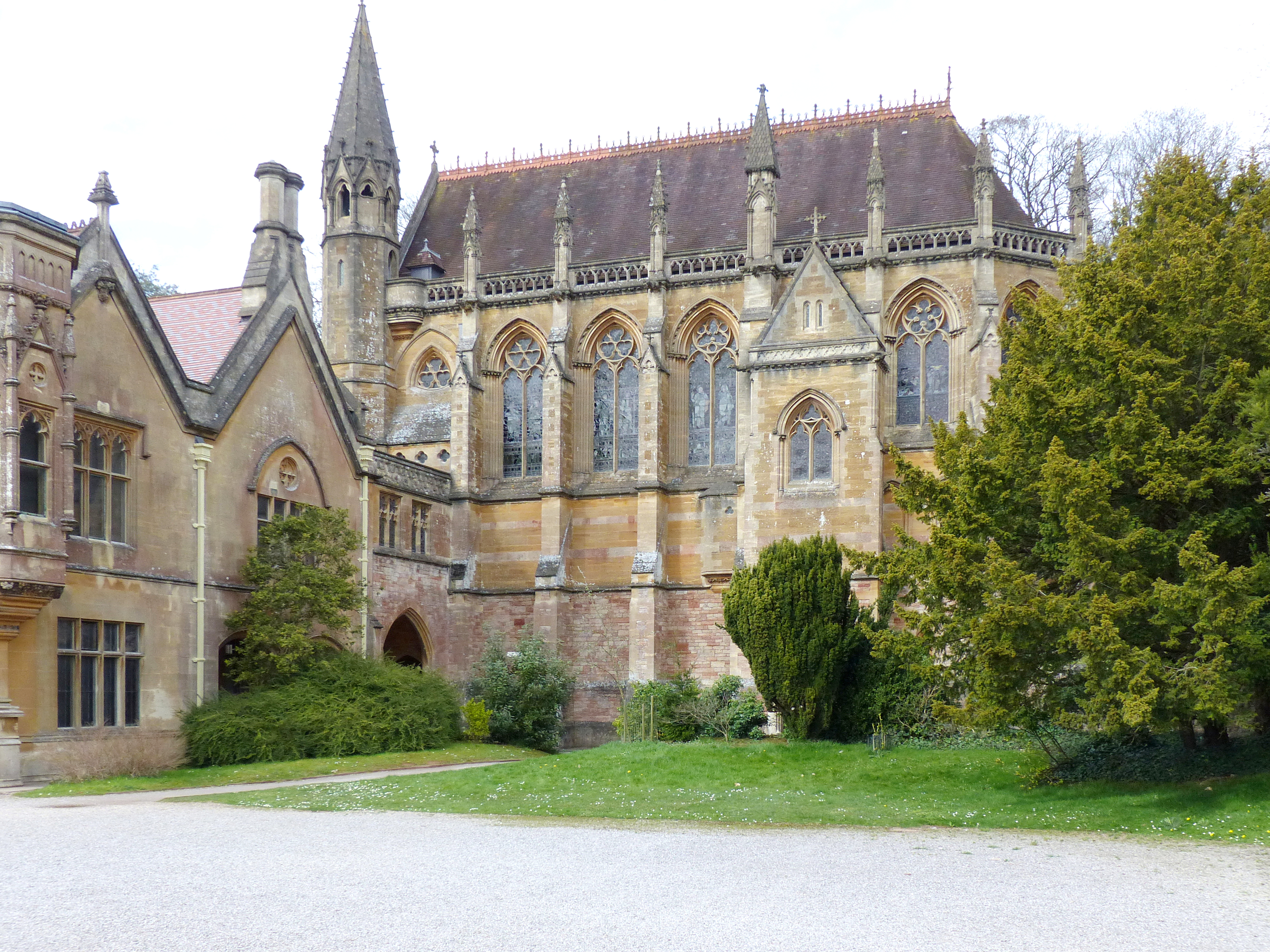
The chapel, built 1872–1877, is modelled on Sainte-Chapelle in Paris. The chapel was licensed for family services, used daily for prayers, but was never consecrated.

Gibbs' final addition to Tyntesfield was added between 1872 and 1877, when he commissioned Arthur Blomfield to add a Gothic chapel to the north side of the house. Modelled on the Sainte-Chapelle in Paris, it housed an organ by William Hill & Sons, and below a vault in which Gibbs intended to be buried. However, combined opposition from both the vicar of the local All Saints Church, Wraxall and the church's patron, a member of the Gorges family, led to the Bishop of Bath and Wells decreeing that he would not sanction the consecration of Tyntesfield's chapel, through fears that it would take power away from the local population fully into Gibb's hands. Despite this, the chapel formed a central part of life at Tyntesfield, and prayers were said twice-daily by the family and their guests. Throughout their period of residence, the family would also open the chapel to local people on an annual basis, often during Rogation days and at Christmas. In praise of the resultant final building, Yonge described the chapel as the final completion of the Tyntesfield project, providing "a character to the household almost resembling that of Little Gidding". The Little Gidding community in Huntingdonshire was much idealized by 19th-century Anglo-Catholics.

== Owners ==
=== William Gibbs: 1846–75 ===
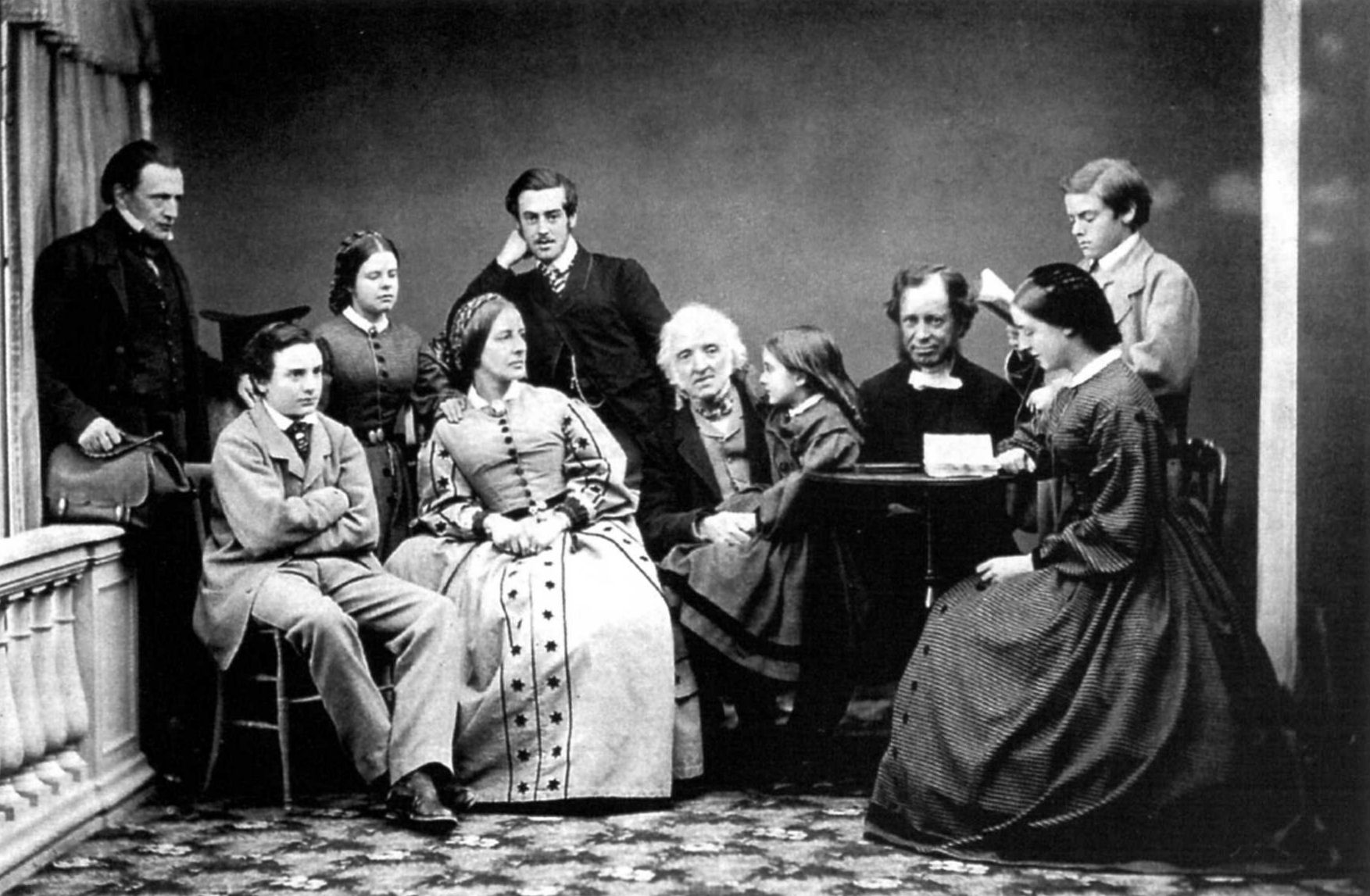
William and Blanche Gibbs and family at Tyntesfield, c. 1862–63

Seven children were born to William and Matilda. All were devout Anglicans, with William and his wife being supporters of the Oxford Movement. He was a major benefactor of Keble College, Oxford, and dedicated the later part of his life to philanthropic works. Also being teetotal, he added to the estate's holding by buying the local Failand Inn, which enabled him to control any riotous behaviour (it was sold to Courage Brewery in 1962 by the 2nd Lord Wraxall). William Gibbs died in the house on 3 April 1875. After a service at the estate chapel on 9 April, 30 estate workers carried his coffin to All Saints Church, Wraxall. He is buried within the family plot in the church grounds.

=== Antony Gibbs:1875–1907 ===
The estate then passed to William's eldest son Antony. After graduating with a Master of Arts degree from Exeter College, Oxford, he joined the North Somerset Yeomanry where he attained the rank of Major. He married Janet Louisa Merivale on 22 June 1872, and returned to Tyntesfield to manage the family estate. Antony held various positions of authority, including Justice of the Peace and later Deputy lieutenant of Somerset. The couple had 10 children.

During the 1880s, Antony had Henry Woodyer redesign the hallway staircase. This allowed more light to permeate the lower floors from the glazed lantern roof, and hence turn the hallway into a reception room. Woodyer also extended the Dining Room by taking in part of the original housekeeper's room. Crace's original wallpaper – a British imitation of Japanese paper, that itself imitated Spanish tooled leather – was lightened by a 14-year-old apprentice who hand-painted in a cream background. The sideboard, which had been commissioned from Collier and Plucknett, was further extended. New items were also ordered from Collier and Plucknett. Simultaneously, Antony had electricity installed, an early UK example of houses being lit in this way. Antony spent the first night after turning on the electrical system watching the main entrance light, to ensure that it did not create a fire and was hence safe for his family. At some point between 1868 and 1884 a water hydraulic lift was installed by Waygood and Co., the remains of which were discovered in 2008. A wooden lift car was discovered on the ground floor and a 55-inch (1,400 mm) spanning sheave in the roof space.

=== George Abraham Gibbs, 1st Baron Wraxall: 1907–31 ===
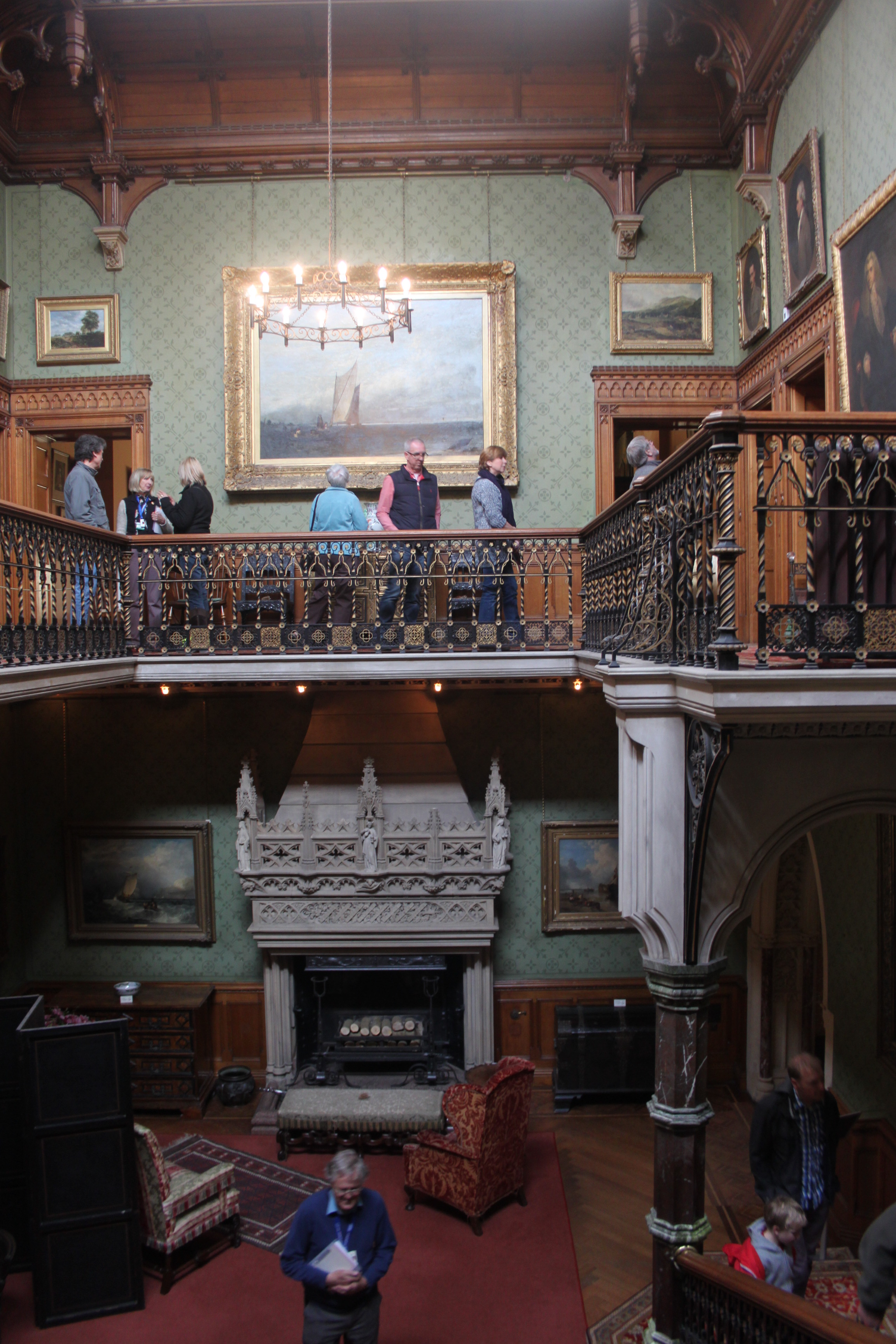
The staircase gallery

George Abraham Gibbs, 1st Baron Wraxall served as a colonel in the North Somerset Yeomanry and served in the Boer War campaign. On his return to England he married the Hon. Victoria Florence de Burgh Long; the couple moved to Clyst St George in Devon. Between 1918 and 1928, he served as MP for Bristol West and was elevated to the peerage as Baron Wraxall in 1928, for which his appointment as Treasurer of the Household had been instrumental.

Under his ownership, the Drawing Room was redecorated in a Renaissance Revival Venetian style, In the process, Crace's stencilling was over painted and then covered by damasked silk, the Norton fireplace was removed, the furniture replaced with Edwardian pieces, and the carpet dyed by Sketchleys. In 1917, to assist the war effort, the ironwork conservatory was razed, and its ironwork melted down for ammunition.

Survived by a daughter, Albina, George's first wife died at Tyntesfield from influenza in 1920. In 1927, George married Ursula Mary Lawley, a daughter of Sir Arthur Lawley (later the 6th and last Baron Wenlock). The couple had two sons, George (known as Richard) and Eustace. George died at Tyntesfield on 28 October 1931, aged 58.

=== Ursula, Lady Wraxall: 1931–79 ===
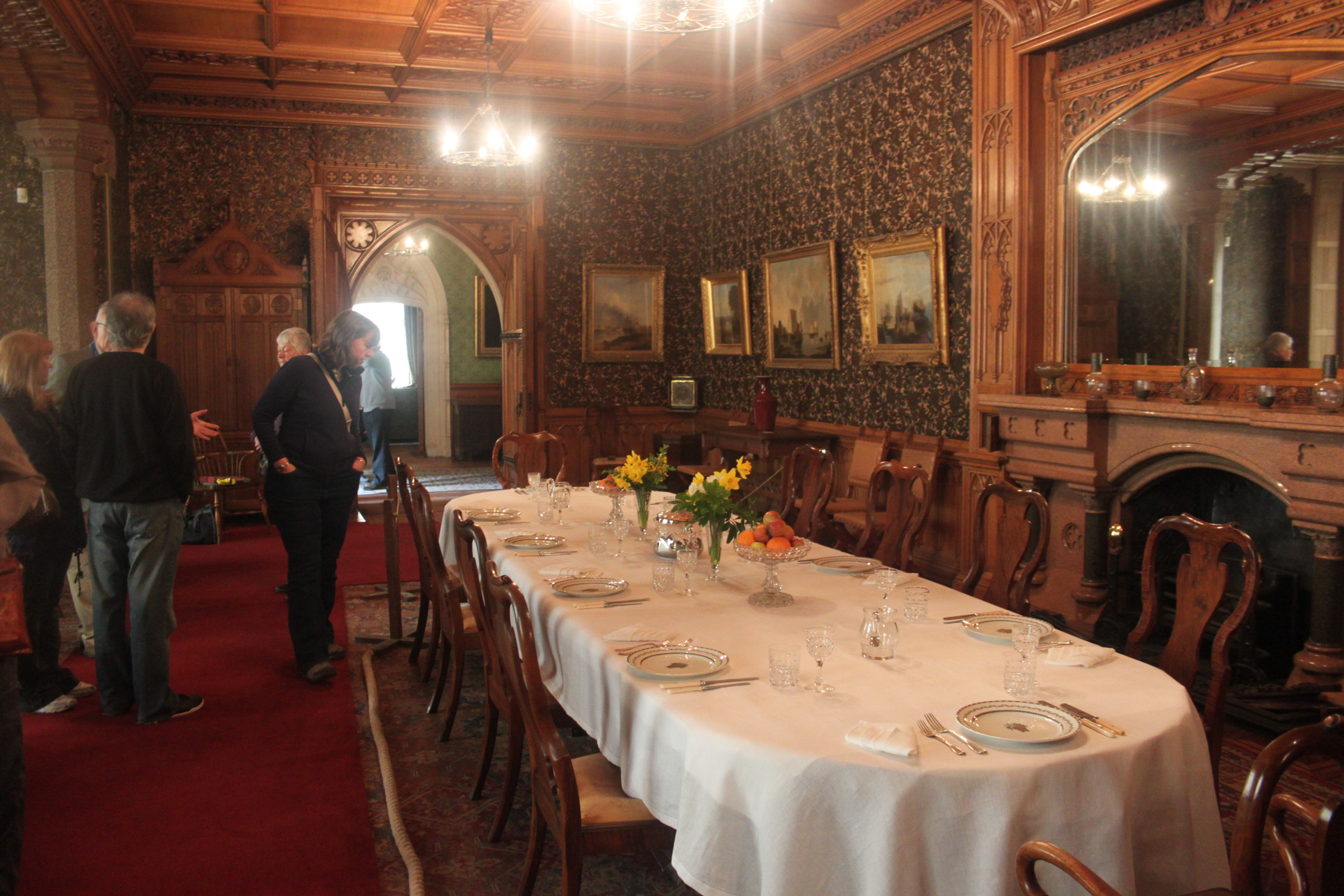
The Dining Room

Lord Wraxall's widow, Ursula, Lady Wraxall, was left with two children under two years of age, little income, and a large estate. Noted for her efficiency and practicality, when the clock tower, the focal point of the house, needed substantial repairs in 1935 to overcome dry and wet rot, she simply had it disassembled, stored the metal parts for possible later usage and realigned the roof as if the clock tower had never existed.

During the Second World War, Clifton High School was relocated to the property, and in 1941 the U.S. Army Medical Corps established a facility for wounded soldiers, known as the 74th General Hospital, in the estate grounds. The construction of this temporary tented village resulted in the US Army Engineers breaching what was then England's longest holly hedge. With many tents later replaced by prefabricated buildings and some nissen huts, at one point in the war following D-Day it became the largest US Army hospital in Europe. During the hostilities, management of the estate's farmland was assumed by the Ministry of Agriculture (MoA), leaving Lady Wraxall only the Home Farm.

Bombs often landed on the estate during the blitz of Bristol. In September 1940, during a raid on the Bristol Aeroplane Company factory at Filton, bombs cut off the estate's water supply, and during a later raid, one bomb badly damaged the lantern roof light over the hallway. In 1946, after the end of the war, Lady Wraxall applied to the Ministry of Defence for a repair grant, but was turned down. As a result, damp, and latterly birds, entered the house through the roof light, until the house came into the ownership of the National Trust and was repaired.

=== Richard Gibbs, 2nd Baron Wraxall: 1979–2001 ===
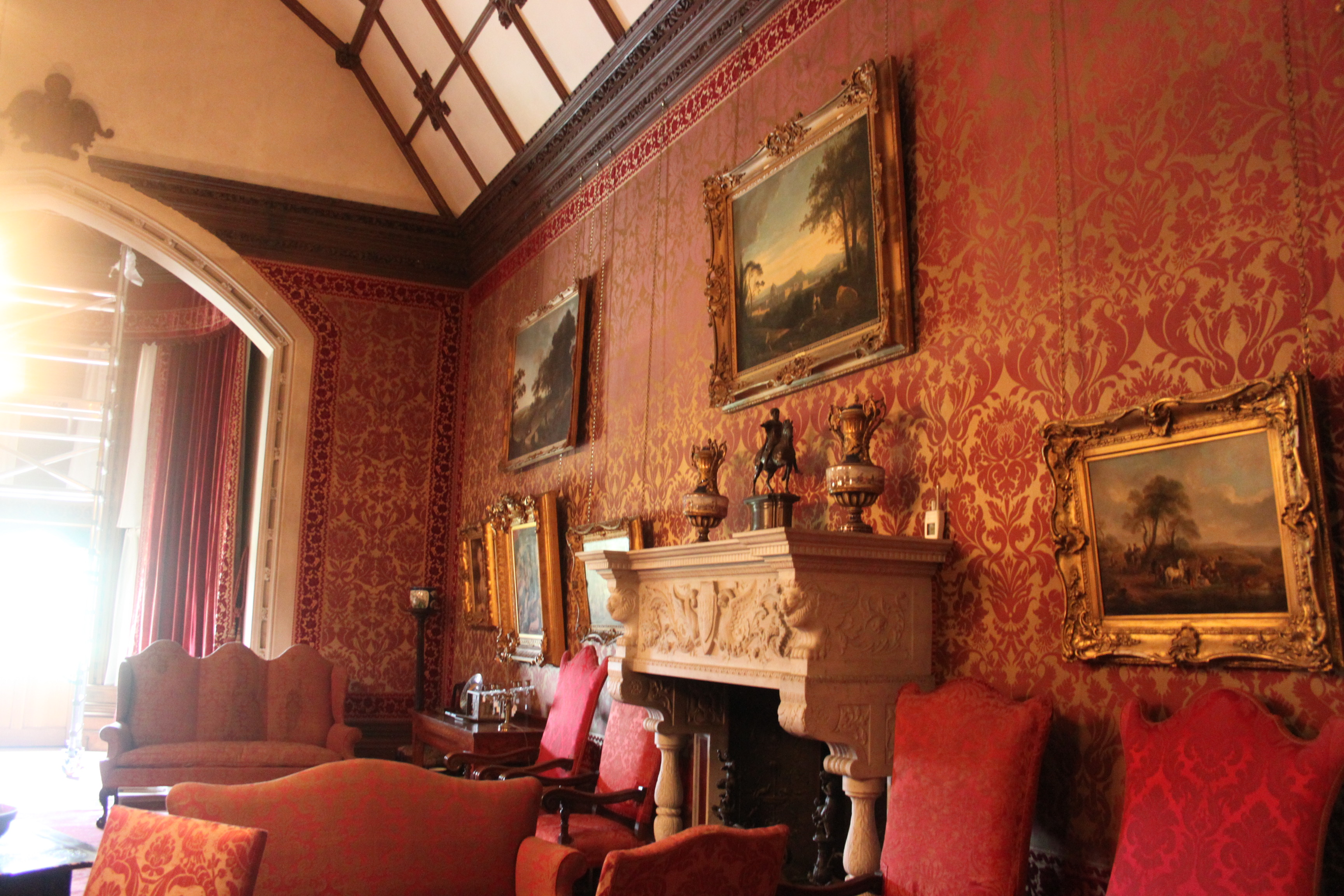
The Drawing Room

George Richard Lawley Gibbs, known as Richard, was born on 16 May 1928, and was educated at Eton College and Sandhurst. He spent eight years with the Coldstream Guards. He never married and was succeeded by his brother, Sir Eustace Gibbs, a diplomat, who became the third Baron Wraxall.

Richard died unmarried in 2001 from complications arising from an asthma attack, having reduced his usage of the substantial accommodation within Tyntesfield to just three rooms.

== National Trust purchase ==
Concerned with the demolition and desecration of various historic country houses since the end of the Second World War – 450 great houses were completely demolished in England between 1945 and 1955 – in the 1970s the National Trust commissioned architect Mark Girouard to catalogue and assess the remaining Victorian country houses across the United Kingdom for significance and structural integrity. He published his findings in a report, and later in the book The Victorian Country House, which in the revised second edition of 1976 included Tyntesfield as allowing access. With the Trust as a result placing Tyntesfield second on its list of priorities for preservation, Girouard said of the property:

There is no other Victorian country house which so richly represents its age as Tyntesfield.

In his later life, Richard Gibbs recognised that the diverse interests of the large family, and the need to invest heavily in even basic refurbishment of the house to make it weather-secured and habitable, would require the family to sell Tyntesfield. Recognising also that substantial death duties would become payable on his death, Richard drew up a will based around a trust that would allow his fortune to pass to the surviving children of his brother and half sister, a total of 19 beneficiaries.

When Richard died, the trust he had set up stated that, should the trustees agree by majority that the estate should be sold, such a sale should be completed within 12 months, and to the highest bidder. The house and estate of 1,000 acres (400 ha) of farmland, 650 acres (260 ha) of woodlands, plus 30 houses and cottages, were listed for sale by Savills in three main lots (total estimated at £15 million); with Christie's contracted to secure the sale of the house and estate contents via a separate auction (total estimated at a further £15 million).

Having not bought a country house since the 1991 purchase of Chastleton House, which took seven years to open to the public, and competing with no special status amongst the bidders, the rumoured competitors to the Trust were listed by the media to have included composer Lord Andrew Lloyd Webber, and pop stars Madonna and Kylie Minogue. However, the new Director-General of the National Trust, Fiona Reynolds, launched a £35 million appeal in May 2002 via the "Save Tyntesfield" campaign, with support from designer Laurence Llewelyn-Bowen, newsreader Jon Snow and several top architects and historians. The Trust's appeal collected £8.2 million in just 100 days, with: £3 million+ from the public; and two substantial anonymous donations of £1 million and £4 million. The Trust also received funding from the National Heritage Memorial Fund, totaling £17.4 million after negotiations with its chair, Liz Forgan, its largest single grant ever which caused some controversy. The National Lottery has earmarked a further £25 million for the major conservation work that is needed.

As a result of the auction, the former "Tyntesfield Estate" no longer exists. The National Trust purchased only the main central part of the Estate which comprises the house, the kitchen garden, and the park. The trust also sold off additional lands. The resultant preserved house and surrounding gardens sat on a total of 150 acres (61 ha) of land are now simply known as Tyntesfield. Charlton Farm, is now home to Children's Hospice South West, which provides palliative care to children with terminal illnesses. Charlton House was sold into private hands, having been since 1927 the home of the Downs School.

=== Initial conservation ===
After taking ownership in 2002, National Trust staff secured the house and gardens, preserving them and the contents, and then catalogued the contents of the house which had been collected by the four generations of the family. Starting out with a staff of 30 volunteers, by 2013 the total of employed and volunteer staff exceeded 600, more than the number engaged by any other National Trust property.

The initial conservation work focused around weatherproofing the house. The repair of the roof, which is 20 times the size of the average British family's home, was made possible by the erection of an extensive free-standing scaffold roof structure. At the height of the restoration works, 28 miles (45 km) of scaffolding tubes covered the building's entire exterior. This allowed repairs and restoration to take place over 18 months, including the final restoration of the original bold red and black tiled geometric diaper pattern. The entire property was rewired with special cabling, copper sheathed (fire and rodent proofed). Much of the original lead piping was replaced and a fireproofing scheme, mainly through the design of a suitable compartmentation system was designed and implemented. Interior scaffolding was installed in the 43 feet (13 m) high hallway to repair the lantern rooflight, and to provide access to other high points of the interior. These initial works cost more than £10 million, much of which was raised through donations via the "Save Tyntesfield" campaign and the sale of lottery tickets to visitors.

The Trust had been reluctant to allow visitors to the house while work was underway, especially taking into account the costs of Health and Safety requirements and the delays these could cause to the essential preservation works. But the need for cash dictated the answer, and the Trust learnt that, through giving the public close access to the preservation works, they actually gave more additional donations as a result of seeing where their money was going and how they were making a difference.

== Estate ==
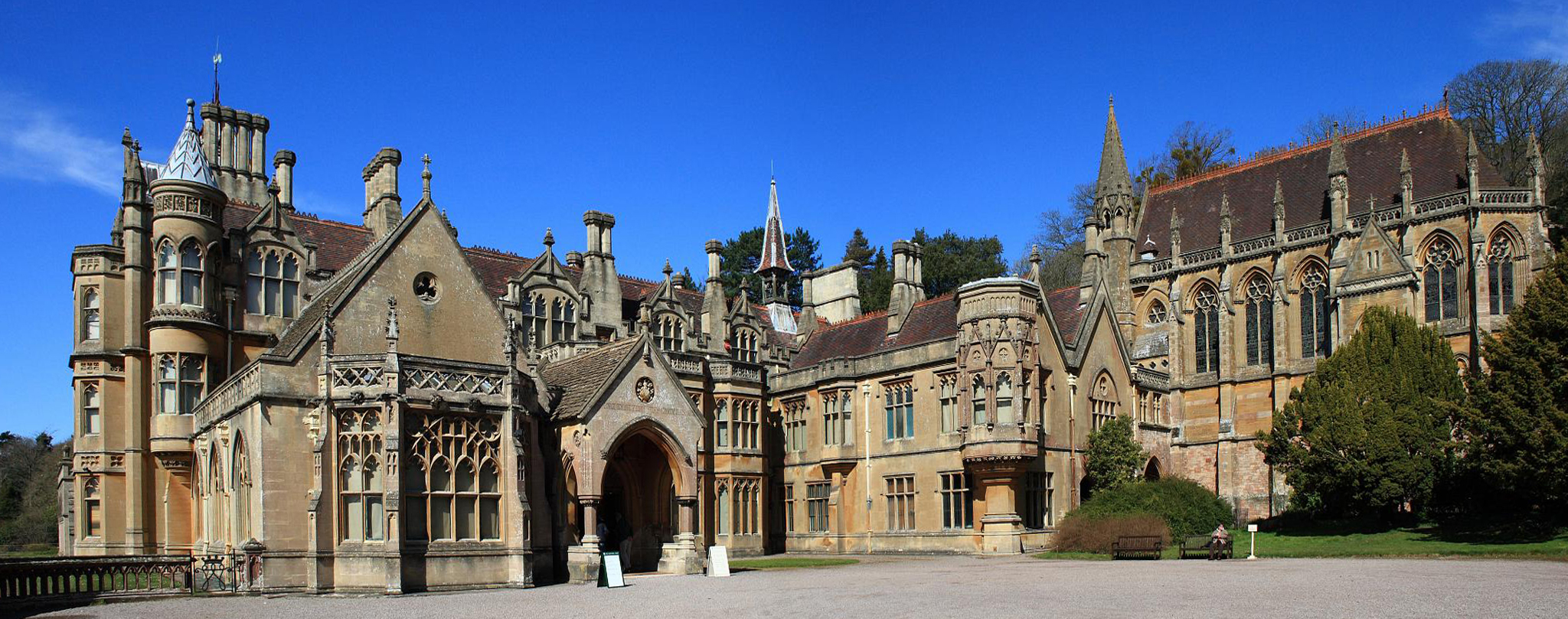
Panoramic view of the entrance area, showing (left to right) the library, entrance hall, main house, bedroom wing and chapel

=== House interior ===
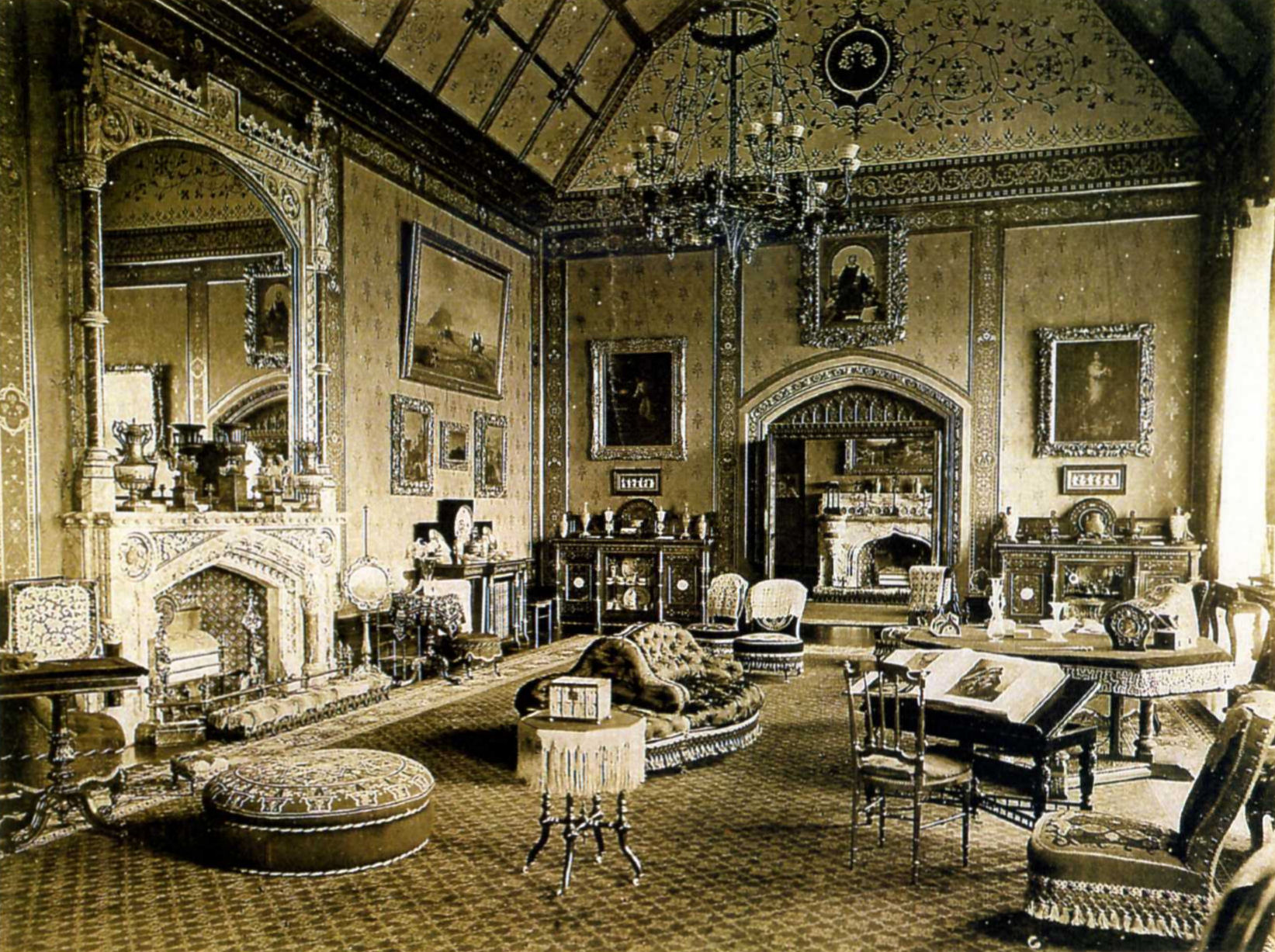
The Drawing Room, photographed in 1878 by Bedford Lemere

Principal rooms include the Library, Drawing Room, Billiard Room, Dining Room and Chapel. During restoration, the National Trust, for the first time, allowed visitors to become involved in the restoration process and "witness the challenge of bringing Tyntesfield back to life."

The Library is regarded as the most important gentleman's library in the possession of the Trust. The carpet and some of the furnishings in the Library were designed by Crace, whilst the book collection is the most extensive Victorian library collection owned by the Trust.

The centre of the house is occupied by the hallway and staircase, which show the greatest number of changes since the original design.

Once the Trust took ownership, scaffolding was placed in the hallway to repair the roof lantern. While this was in place the architectural paint analyst Lisa Oestreicher was able to examine the decorative scheme that had been used in the spaces and room frequented by the public. Three principal phases were identified: 1860s original; 1870s updates and adaptions; 1887–90 redecoration, which returned the main spaces to the original green colours and motifs created by Crace. Once lantern repairs were complete, the Trust replaced the elderly chenille carpet destroyed by contractors working for Christie's with a new Wilton carpet with a replica design by Linney Cooper, bought with £45,000 from public lottery donations.

=== Contents ===
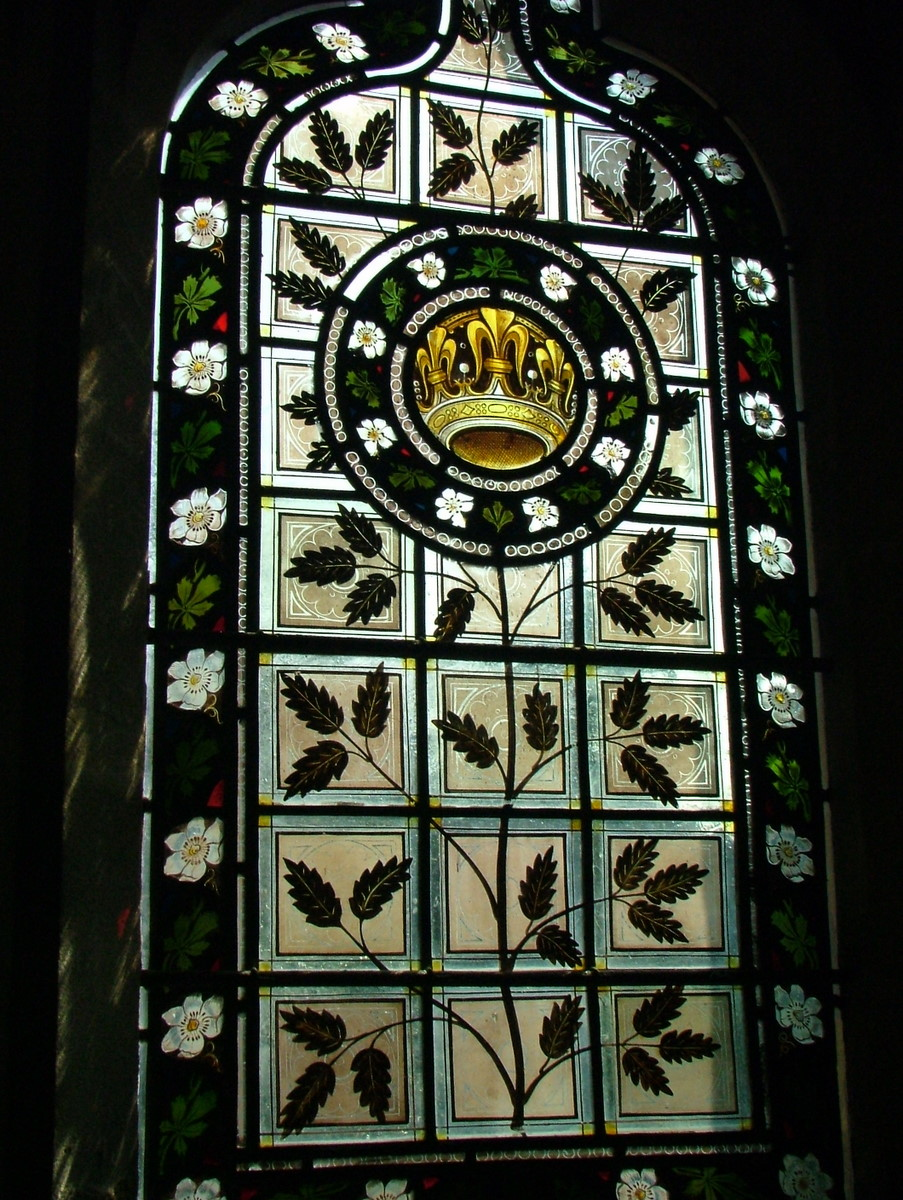
Tyntesfield is decorated with large amounts of stained glass.

Christie's originally estimated the house contents at in excess of 10,000 items, but by 2008 a total of 30,000 items had been listed including: William Butterfield designed silver; original print books by Pugin and John Ruskin; an unexploded Second World War bomb; a jewel-encrusted chalice; a roll of 19th-century flock wallpaper; and a coconut with carved face and hair. By 2013 the inventory had risen to 47,154 items, with still more rooms to unpack and catalog.

=== Paintings ===
Many of the family's extensive collection of paintings, most sourced from Spain by William, were donated to the Trust. In part this was due to their poor condition, which involved not just water but also ironically guano damage. The most important painting in the collection is the 17th-century work by Alonso de Llera Zambrano of St Lawrence, which hangs in the middle of one of the walls of the hall. It was cleaned and repaired by local art conservators Bush and Berry, who are based in a chapel William Gibbs built in the village of Flax Bourton. In 2011 the Trust bought the painting The Mater Dolorosa (Mother of Sorrows) by Bartolomé Esteban Murillo at Christie's auction in New York, which had hung at Tyntesfield since William purchased it until some time after 1910.

=== Home Farm Visitor Centre ===
The Home Farm buildings were built in the 1880s, split over two levels. To the south is a two-storey covered yard with a timber roof structure, used for the rearing of farm animals. On the upper level is the main yard, where to the east and west are two wings, one side of which housed the former piggery. The farm offices make up the north wing, to fully enclose the square but gently south-sloping yard.

The Grade II*listed buildings (Note: Grade II*listed buildings are particularly important buildings of more than special interest, whereas Grade II buildings are of special interest, warranting every effort to preserve them.) needed full renovation, which took a secondary priority in the Trust's plans after the house. The Trust have converted the buildings into an integrated and self-contained visitor centre, which opened in mid-2011 with:

- Upper yard:
  - Demonstration area: country crafts from visiting crafts people
  - Plant centre: excess plants raised by the gardeners are sold to raise funds
  - Farm-themed play area
  - Secondhand books stall: proceeds from which raise funds for the Trust
- Restaurant: the former two-story covered yard has been fully renovated and converted into a cafe/restaurant; it also houses the gift shop. A new-build staircase, lift and bridge walkway all in steel provide access from the upper yard
- A separate building to the east provides power and heat to the visitor centre, using a combination of solar thermal panels, photovoltaic cells and a biomass boiler.

=== Park ===
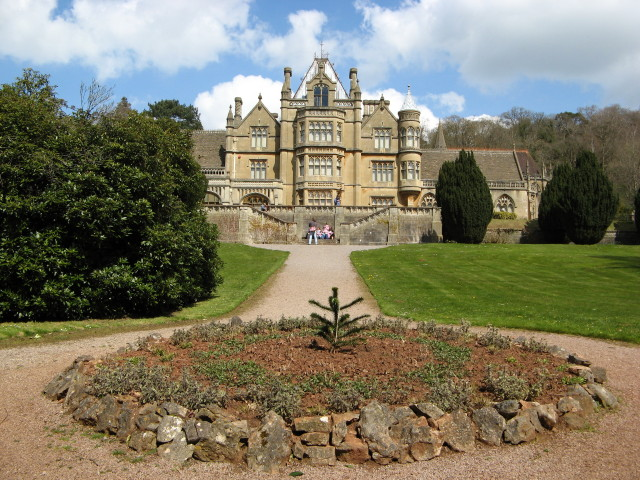
View from the eastern formal gardens looking up towards the house, April 2008

The house sits within 150 acres (61 ha) of parkland, which the Trust gained from the auction and retained around the property to preserve the house within its environment. The wooded park leads down a tree-lined drive to balustraded terraces, and paths lead to the rose garden, summer houses, the aviary and the former concrete-lined lake, which has been empty since the Second World War.

From the latter part of the nineteenth century onwards, William Gibbs and descendants added interesting specimens to the existing trees in the two areas of parkland to the South and West of the house and gardens. The estate now has fourteen Champion Trees on The Tree Register.

A five-year project by the National Trust, underway in 2022, to conserve ancient, veteran and notable trees, in a number of sites across Bristol, included Tyntesfield. The Tyntesfield site is of additional national significance because its many ancient and veteran trees support populations of rare, vulnerable and endangered invertebrates.

=== Kitchen garden ===
The kitchen garden includes glasshouses and frames, the large classical Orangery and quarters for the gardeners.

=== Orangery ===
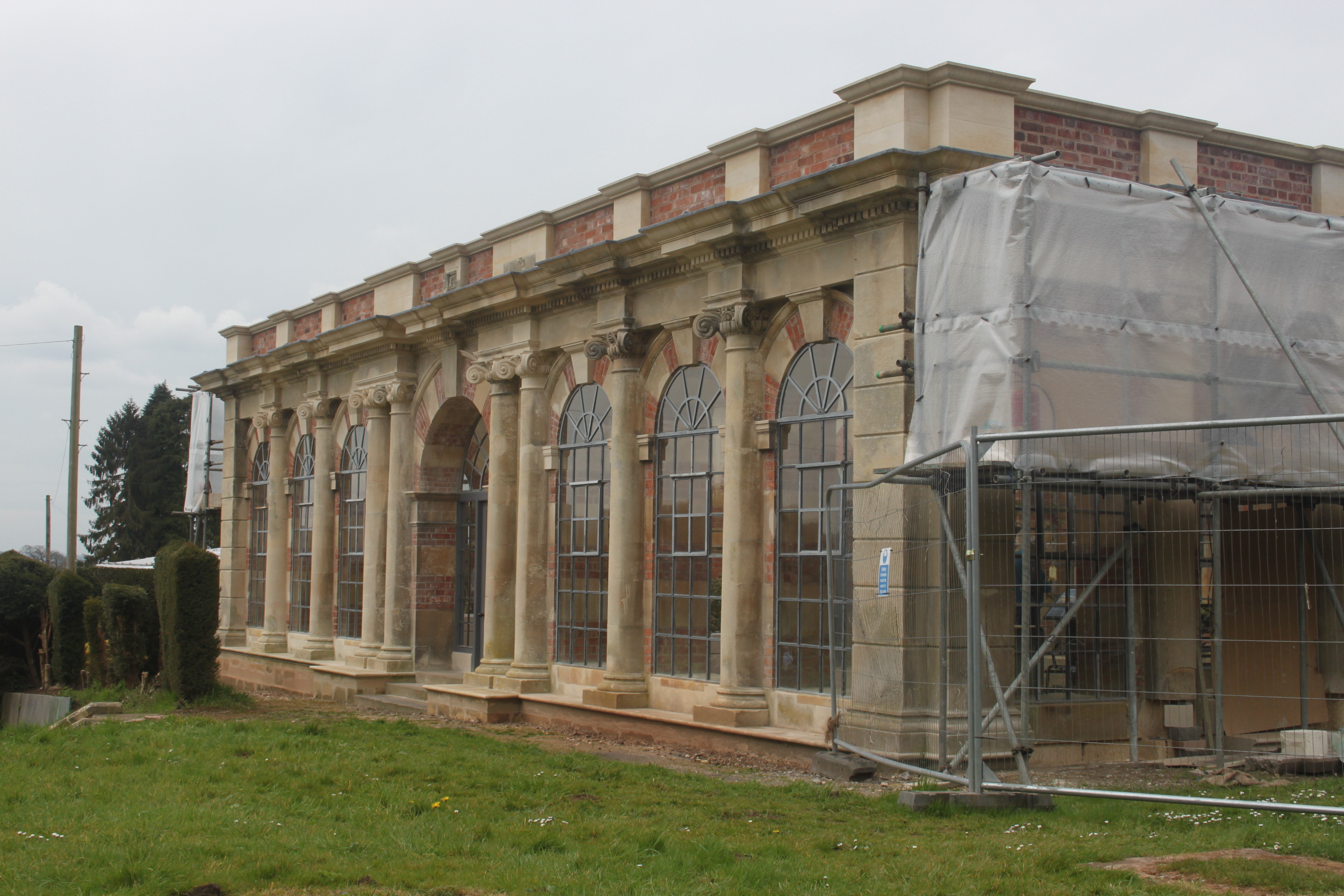
The Orangery

The Grade II*listed Orangery was once the architectural focal point of the kitchen garden complex. But when the Trust bought the property, the Orangery was in such a precarious state of deterioration that it was on English Heritage's Heritage at Risk Register in the highest priority category, A.

Built in 1897, it is a rare surviving example of a late Victorian orangery in the Classical style, constructed from ashlar and red brick. It has a seven-bay east/west plan with central entrances and three bays north–south, topped by a fully glazed ironwork hipped-roof. An entablature with protruding horizontal geison sits above Ionic half-column supports and corner pilasters. The centre entrance bay on the west front towards the kitchen garden breaks forward as a portico, with pairs of giant engaged columns and broken pediment with a small oculus. Between each pair of columns are large round-headed windows with Gibbs surrounds and keystones.

To preserve and restore the Orangery, the Trust teamed-up with City of Bath College and Nimbus Conservation Ltd in an innovative partnership, whereby 12 trainee stonemasons worked alongside professional craftsmen to hone their skills and carry out the specialist stonework needed. The Trust also introduced workshops for other restoration professionals, academics and eventually opened them to interested members of the public, where all were educated in a hands-on environment in the skills required to repair the building. For this crafts-based training initiative, in 2011 the Trust won a The Daily Telegraph sponsored English Heritage Angel Award.

The budget for the works was £420,000, with initial work focused on stabilising the foundations and lower masonry. Much of this was achieved through the injection of stabilising materials into the foundations, which needed time to cure and solidify. Works then progressed to the walls and roof, and finally the decorative embellishments. Today, while part of the Orangery is a dedicated café, the rest is used for training new craftsmen and restoration specialists.

=== Aviary ===
The aviary at Tyntesfield is situated to the west of the house, adjacent to the footings of the old conservatory. It was built in 1880 to house exotic birds, but was converted into a playhouse for Doreen, the first Lord Wraxall's daughter. The aviary is considered one of the most distinctive features of the estate, and is Grade II listed.

=== Sawmill ===
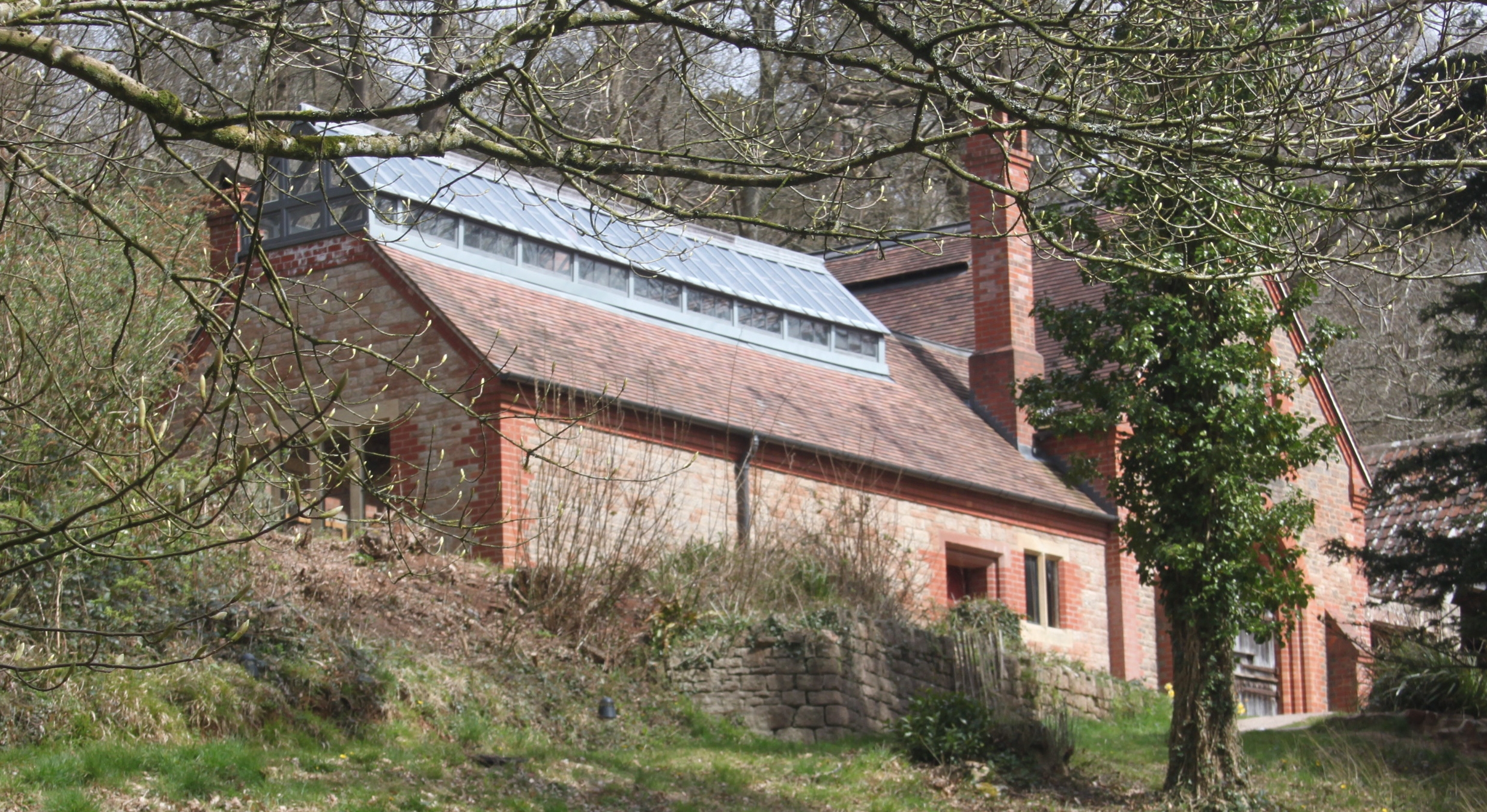
Tyntesfield Sawmill buildings, now fully restored and converted to a Learning Centre

Located on a site originally occupied by a foreman's office when the land was used for quarrying, the new sawmill building was completed in 1899, providing electricity via two enclosed steam engines and pneumatic power across the estate. The engines were housed in what is now called the Engine Room, while the Lantern Room held multiple lead acid batteries. After opening, the decision was made to relocate the estate's entire sawmill to the building, to enable better access to electrical power. The steam engines were replaced by diesel generators, and electricity was provided from the national grid post-WW2. In the 1960s, the sawmill was decommissioned and all wood sold to third party contractors to be converted into sawn wood products.

Under the Trust's ownership the sawmill has been renovated and converted into a combined learning, educational and rentable function space for businesses and members of the public. It is most often used by National Trust staff and volunteers to educate visiting school groups. The building now houses the biomass boiler for the main house, which saves 141 tonnes of CO_{2} a year over the old oil-fired boiler. Another section of the former wood shed was used as a new roost site for bat species, creating a "bat palace". The centre was opened in May 2009 by Dame Jenny Abramsky, Chair of the Heritage Lottery Fund, who partially funded the works.

=== Wildlife ===
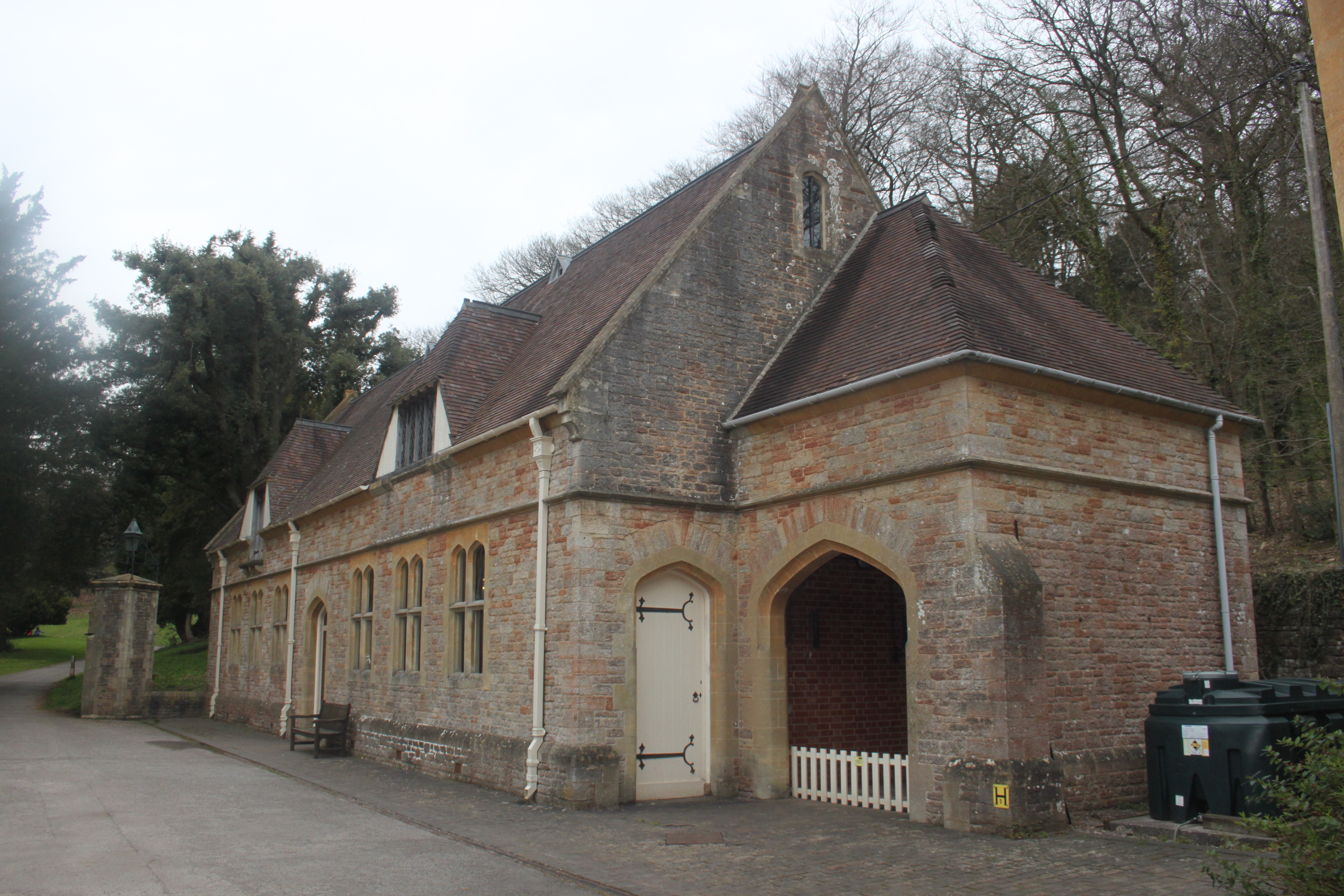
The stable block at Tyntesfield, the roof of which is a bat roost

==== Bats ====
Ten of the seventeen species of UK bat are found on the property, eight within the structure of the house alone. Species found include the rare and threatened lesser horseshoe bat and greater horseshoe bat. Maintenance work is timed to fit in with hibernating and mating schedules, and new roosts are created during any building work. Visitors may see some of the property's bats on a closed-circuit television system.

== Visitor access ==
Visitor access to Tyntesfield is via the B3128 road. The nearest train station is 2 miles (3.2 km) away at Nailsea and Backwell. Bus services are available from Bristol. The grounds include six geocaching trails.

== In popular culture ==
In 2002, after its purchase by the National Trust but before its opening to the public, the house and its contents were explored in the Oxford Films documentary, The Lost World of Tyntesfield, hosted by art historian Dan Cruickshank. The house was featured in the 2017 film Crooked House, an adaptation of the Agatha Christie novel of the same name starring Glenn Close, Terence Stamp, Max Irons and Christina Hendricks. It also featured in the BBC television series Sherlock in the episode "The Abominable Bride" and Doctor Who in the episode "Hide".

== See also ==
- Grade I listed buildings in North Somerset
- List of National Trust properties in Somerset
