= Blanche Gibbs =

English philanthropist (1817-1887)

- Born: Matilda Blanche Crawley-Boevey; December 17, 1817; Gloucester, England
- Died: September 22, 1887 (aged 69); Tyntesfield, Somerset, England
- Other names: Matilda Blanche Gibbs
- Occupation: Philanthropist
- Known for: support of the Oxford Movement, funding churches, hospitals, and educational institutions
- Movement: Oxford Movement, Anglo-Catholicism
- Spouse: William Gibbs
- Children: 7

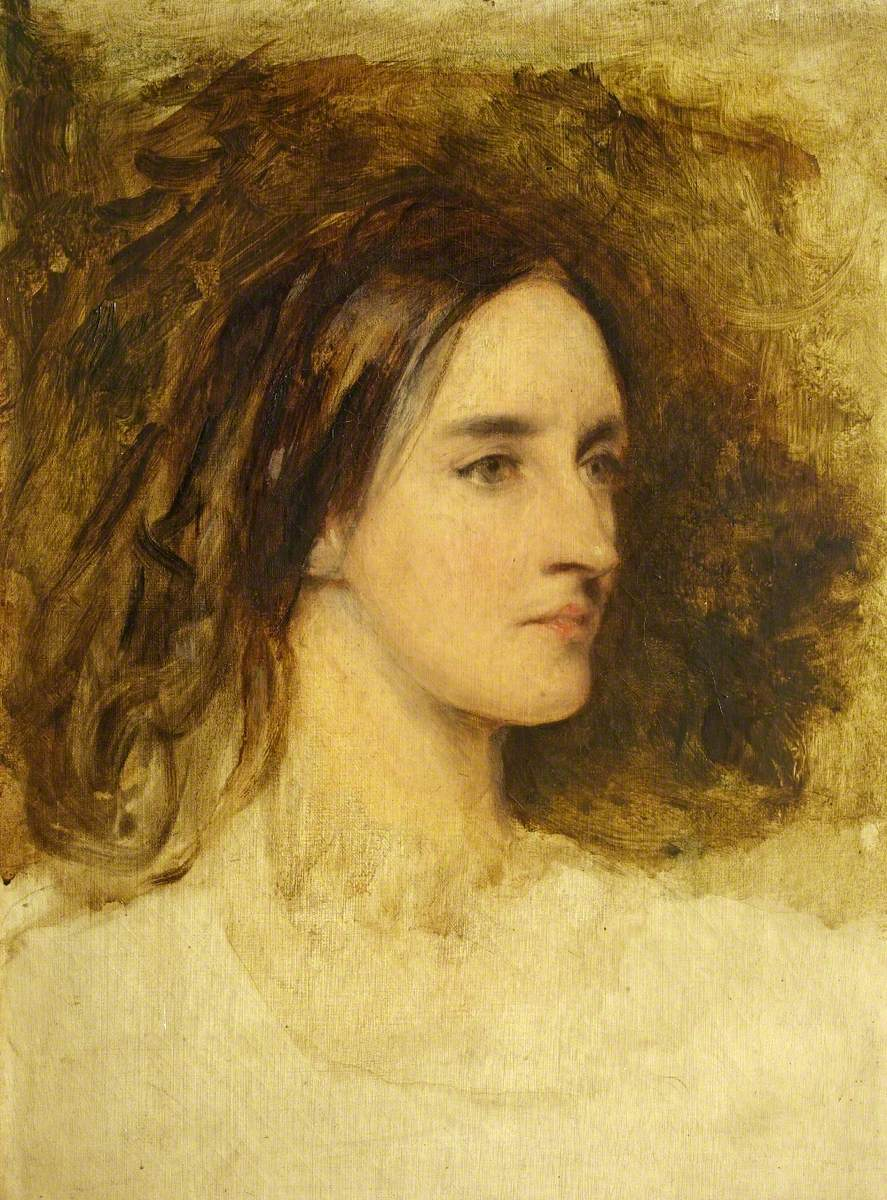
Matilda Blanche Crawley-Boeveys, Mrs. William Gibbs, painted by William Boxall (National Trust)

Blanche Gibbs (17 December 1817 – 22 September 1887) also known as Matilda Blanche Gibbs or Matilda Blanche Crawley-Boevey, was an English philanthropist, and a supporter of the Oxford Movement in 19th century England. Along with her husband, William Gibbs, a businessman, she funded the establishment and restoration of many churches and religious structures. After his death, as the inheritor of his estate, she expanded her philanthropy towards social and welfare efforts including the creation of convalescent homes, hospitals, and educational institutions.

== Early life ==
Matilda Blanche was born on 17 December 1817, and was the third daughter of Sir Thomas Crawley-Boevey, Third Baronet, and Mary Albinia, daughter of Sir Thomas Hyde Page, in Gloucester. She primarily used her middle name, Blanche.

== Marriage and family ==
Blanche married William Gibbs, a merchant who was her distant cousin, on 1 August 1839, in Gloucestershire. Together, they had seven children: Antony, William, George Abraham, Henry Martin, Dorothea Harriett, Alice Blanche, and Albinia Anne. Three of her children died at a young age of tuberculosis. Gibbs was an extremely wealthy man, the co-founder of the firm Antony Gibbs & Sons, and had built his fortune in trading goods from South America, particularly guano. They lived primarily in London before moving to Tyntesfield, a Victorian Gothic revival mansion in Somerset, that William Gibbs bought and remodeled, and which now belongs to the National Trust.

== Philanthropy ==
Blanche and William Gibbs were members of the Oxford movement, a 19th-century religious movement that eventually resulted in the formation of Anglo-Catholicism. Together, they engaged in a number of religious philanthropic projects, and were the main donors that established the London Diocesan Deaconesses Institution, as well as the establishment of several churches and educational institutions in England. These included the building of Keble College and its chapel, at Oxford University, for which they donated £30,000, as well as funding the establishment of the St Michael and All Angels Church, Exeter, and the restoration of the Bristol Cathedral and Exeter Cathedral.

In 1875, following William Gibbs' death, his estate was inherited by Blanche Gibbs, who continued their religious philanthropic work but expanded it to encompass social and welfare efforts as well. Independently, Blanche Gibbs established a number of philanthropic institutions including the St Michael's and All Angels' Home for Consumptives in Axbridge, in 1878, a hospital, St Michael's Home at Cheddar (which was designed by architect William Butterfield, and is now known as St Michael's Cheshire Home) and the St John's Convalescent Home at Tyntesfield. Several of these homes built by Blanche Gibbs were dedicated to patients who suffered from pulmonary tuberculosis, a disease that resulted in the deaths of three of her seven children. She also funded the establishment of a temperance house in Somerset, which later became a well-known brewery and pub, known as the Battle Axes. In 1881, she endowed a scholarship at Keble College.

== Death and legacy ==
Blanche Gibbs died of uterine cancer at Tyntesfield, a country house that remained the principal residence for her and her husband, on 22 September 1887, at the age of 69. An unfinished portrait of her, painted by Sir William Boxall, is a part of the National Trust Collections of the United Kingdom, as well as a second portrait, painted by Walter Charles Horseley. Additionally, a portrait of Blanche Gibbs, along with five of her children, painted by Sir William Charles Ross, is also part of the National Trust Collections, and was displayed at the Royal Academy in 1850.
