= William Gibbs (businessman) =

English businessman (1790–1875)

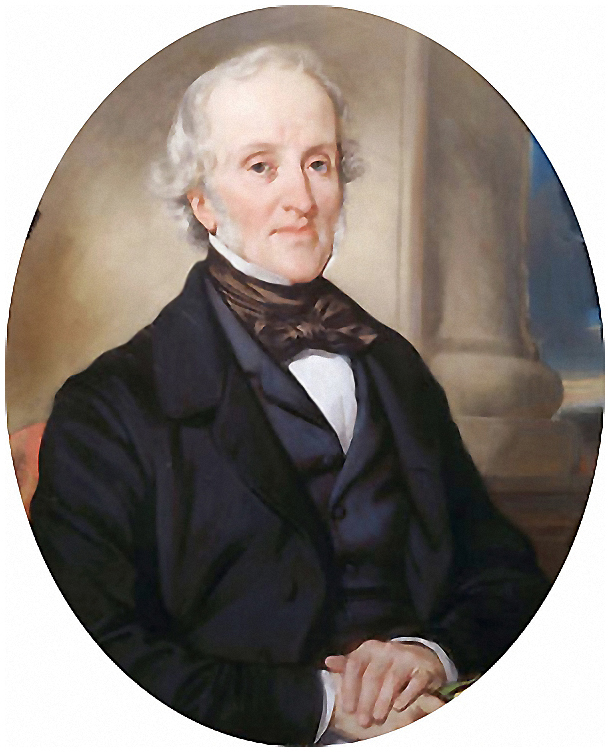
- Born: 22 May 1790; Madrid, Spain
- Died: 3 April 1875 (aged 84); Tyntesfield, North Somerset, England
- Resting place: All Saints Church, Wraxall
- Monuments: St Michael and All Angels Church, Exeter
- Education: Blundell's School
- Occupations: Merchant, businessman, investor, merchant banker
- Years active: 1806–1875
- Employer: Antony Gibbs & Sons
- Known for: Co-founder of Antony Gibbs & Sons, religious philanthropist, developer of Tyntesfield, richest non-noble in the United Kingdom
- Movement: Oxford Movement
- Spouse: Matilda Blanche Crawley-Boevey (1 August 1839 – 3 April 1875; his death)
- Children: Eight
- Parent(s): Antony and Dolly Gibbs
- Relatives: Sir Vicary Gibbs (uncle); Hucks Gibbs, 1st Baron Aldenham (nephew)

William Gibbs (1790–1875) was an English businessman, best known as one of three founding partners in Antony Gibbs & Sons, a religious philanthropist, and the owner who developed Tyntesfield in Wraxall, North Somerset.

== Early life ==
Born at No.6 Calle de Cantarranas, Madrid, Spain, he was the second son of merchant-trader Antony Gibbs (1756–1815) and his wife, Dorothea Barnetta (née Hucks, 1760–1820). Antony, who had been born and raised in Clyst St Mary, Devon, was the fourth son of Dr. George Abraham Gibbs (1718–1794), who rose to be Chief Surgeon at the Royal Devon and Exeter Hospital. His other children included the judge and politician Sir Vicary Gibbs, William's uncle.

Antony was a Spanish-based wool trader who went into business with his brother and became bankrupt after his brother's untimely death. The brothers' father had backed the business financially and was also made bankrupt. Having apprenticed to a merchant-trader based in Bristol and then served as his agent in Spain, Antony returned with his new family to Spain to clear his debts and hence his name.

William Gibbs's childhood was divided between Britain and Spain. After his elder brother, Henry, reached school age, the family returned to Exeter, where William and his brother attended a school run by Charles Lloyd. From 1800, William attended Blundell's School in Tiverton, but was withdrawn in 1802 to join his father and brother on a business trip to their offices in Cádiz. Both brothers never returned full-time to school, in part reflecting the precarious nature of their father's business.

== Career ==
In 1806, William was apprenticed as a clerk to his uncle George Gibbs in his business Gibbs, Bright and Gibbs. Based in the Port of Bristol, this firm acted as a landside agent for various shipping operators, and had built itself further on the Atlantic slave trade.

In 1808, after his father's export business in Spain had faded, the family had moved to Dulwich Common in London. There Antony founded an import business handling Spanish and Portuguese wine and fruit, and handled the property interests of the Portuguese government within the United Kingdom. Backed by Vicary Gibbs, he founded Antony Gibbs & Co. After his elder brother Henry had joined the business in 1811 and expanded the firm's interests into merchant banking, William joined the firm in London. Renamed Antony Gibbs & Sons, it was founded and run as a family partnership, with the board chaired by Antony and including Henry and William, while the family shareholders included their uncle Vicary.

=== Antony Gibbs & Sons ===
William's first duty was to return to Cádiz, where he rebuilt the Spanish business. After the death of their father in 1815, he returned to London and ran the business jointly with his brother. The two vowed to repay their father and grandfather's debts from their bankruptcies, and had fully done so with all interest by 1840. Henry died in 1842.

=== Guano trade ===
The firm had opened an agents office in Lima in 1822. In 1841, the agent announced he was about to sign contracts with the Peruvian and Bolivian governments to purchase consignments of guano. Imports started slowly, with 182 tonnes in 1842 but grew rapidly after 1847, when Peru granted the firm a monopoly on trade with Europe and North America. It reached 211,000 tonnes in 1856 and 435,000 tonnes in 1862.

In the early 1850s, reports began to reach Europe and Asia that the mining of guano on the Chincha Islands was reproducing the evils of African slavery in the Caribbean. In 1854, the Superintendent of British trade in China forbade British subjects or vessels from transporting indentured Chinese labour to the Chinchas and this was confirmed in the UK Parliament in 1855 with the passing of the Chinese Passengers Act.

The Peruvian government conducted its own investigation, which told of frequent whippings and attempted suicides. As a result, it transferred the contract for the extraction of the guano to Antony Gibbs & Sons. Despite this, abuse continued and in 1856 further import of Chinese labour was banned. In 1860 it was calculated that of the 4000 Chinese labourers who had been consigned to the guano pits of Peru, not one had survived.

The firm's profits from the guano trade were between £80,000 and £100,000 a year in the 1850s and 1860s with William receiving between 50% and 70% of this until 1864, when he began to withdraw his capital. William became the richest non-noble man in England, remembered in the Victorian music hall ditty:

William Gibbs made his dibs, Selling the turds of foreign birds

Within a few years however, cheaper products such as nitrate of soda and super phosphate fertilisers were available. By 1880 the company had moved its South American base to Chile, where it manufactured nitrate of soda and its by-product iodine, both of which were in high demand for use in the burgeoning European and North American munitions trade.

=== Gibbs, Bright & Co. ===
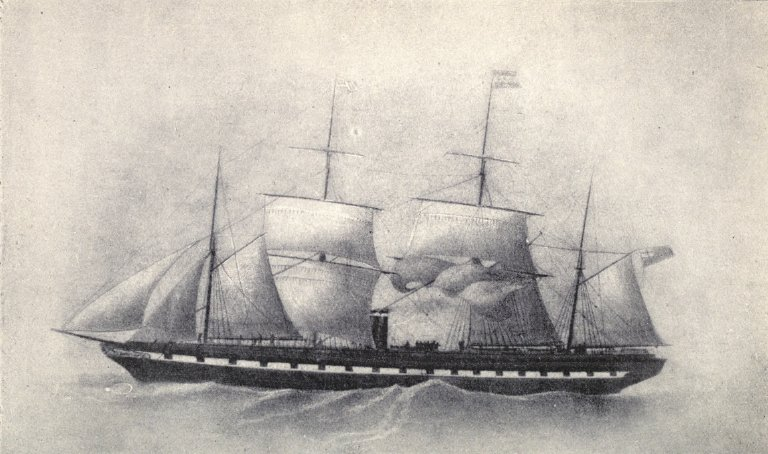
SS Great Britain in 1853, after her refit to four masts

Antony had taken a share in his uncle's shipping business, which on George Snr's death was renamed Gibbs, Bright & Co. of Bristol and Liverpool, with partners George Gibbs Jnr (managing), William Gibbs and Robert Bright. The firm acted as the shipping agent for various companies, including the "Great Western Steam Shipping Company", whose fleet included Isambard Kingdom Brunel's SS Great Britain. After she ran aground west of Ireland, the firm acquired her and fully refitted her, running her for the next 30+ years on the Anglo-Australian run as an emigrant liner. In 1882 Great Britain was converted into a sailing ship to transport bulk coal, but after a fire on board in 1886 she was found on arrival at Port Stanley in the Falkland Islands to be damaged beyond repair. She was sold to the Falkland Islands Company and used, afloat, as a storage hulk (coal bunker) until 1937, when she was towed to Sparrow Cove, scuttled and abandoned.

In 1881, after the death of William and the later retirement of Robert Bright, the firm was acquired and absorbed into Antony Gibbs & Sons.

== Retirement and philanthropy ==
In 1843, Henry Hucks Gibbs (later Lord Aldenham) nephew of William joined the business in which he became more and more involved. When William retired in 1858 (he remained Prior or chairman of the firm until his death), he left Huck Gibbs in charge. In his Will, William bequeathed the majority of his shares over time in the partnership to Huck, which ensured business continuity and also transferred ownership of the business to the Aldenham-side of the family.

A noted supporter of the revivalist Oxford Movement, after leaving his daily career William increased his philanthropic work, especially in religious matters. He was involved in more than twelve church projects including:

- Keble College, Oxford, both the Chapel and Hall – both fully funded.
- St Michael and All Angels Church, Exeter – after receiving a request from the Reverend Joseph Toye, Vicar of St. David's Exeter, for assistance in erecting a chapel at Mount Dinham, Gibbs fully funded an enlarged plan for the erection of St Michael and All Angels Church. After his death, the parish commissioned a memorial to William Gibbs, which the church today still contains.
- St. Antony Cowley – fully funded and built in memory of his parents
- St. Andrew Exwick – fully funded the extension to the chapel in 1872. Then bought lands to make it a separate parish, to which he then funded the construction of a suitable vicarage. The first new vicar was his nephew, Rev. William Cobham Gibbs, followed by another nephew Rev. John Lomax Gibbs.

== Tyntesfield ==
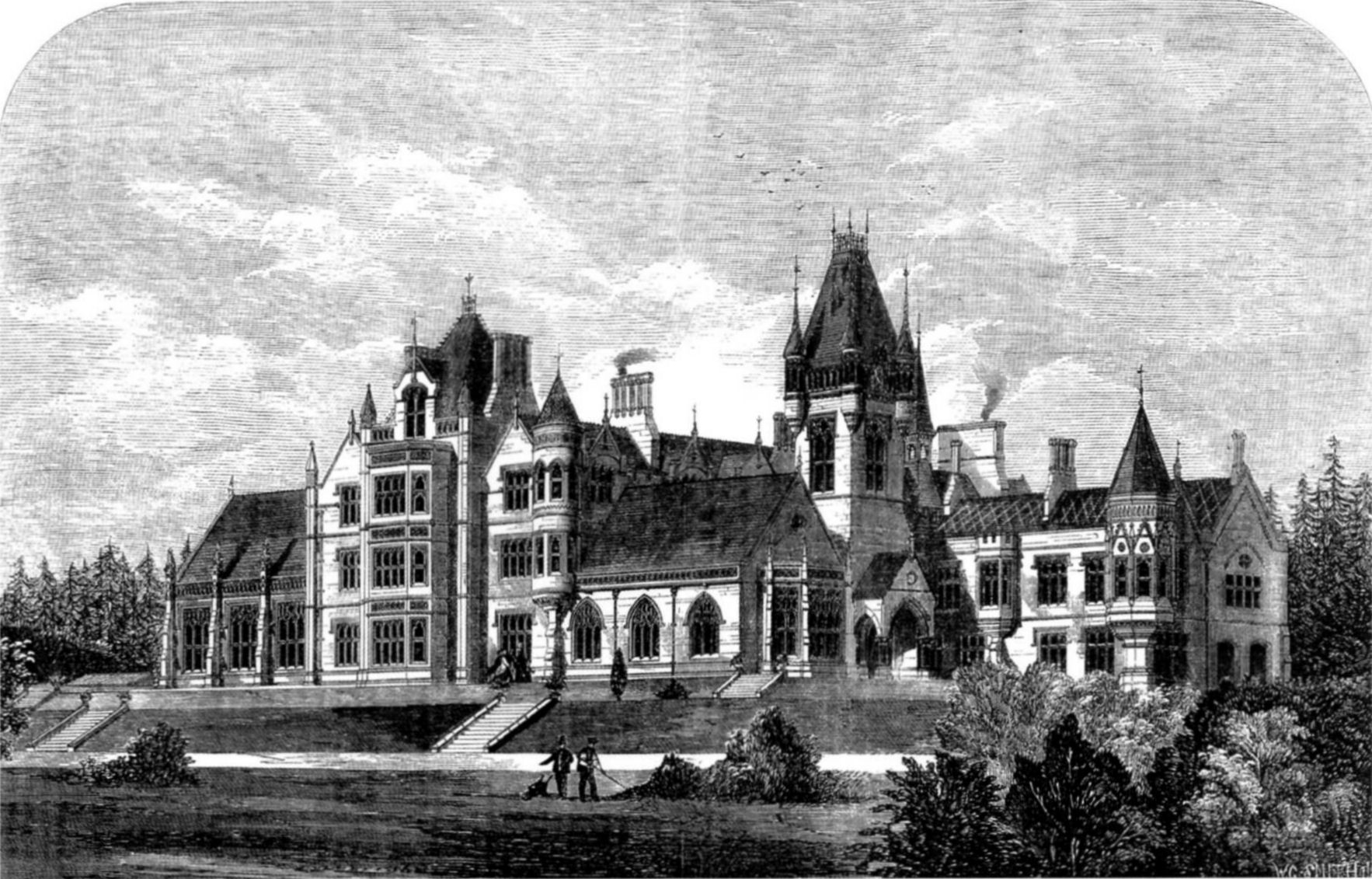
Image of Tyntesfield in an 1866 edition of The Builder magazine (the central clock tower shown was demolished in 1935)

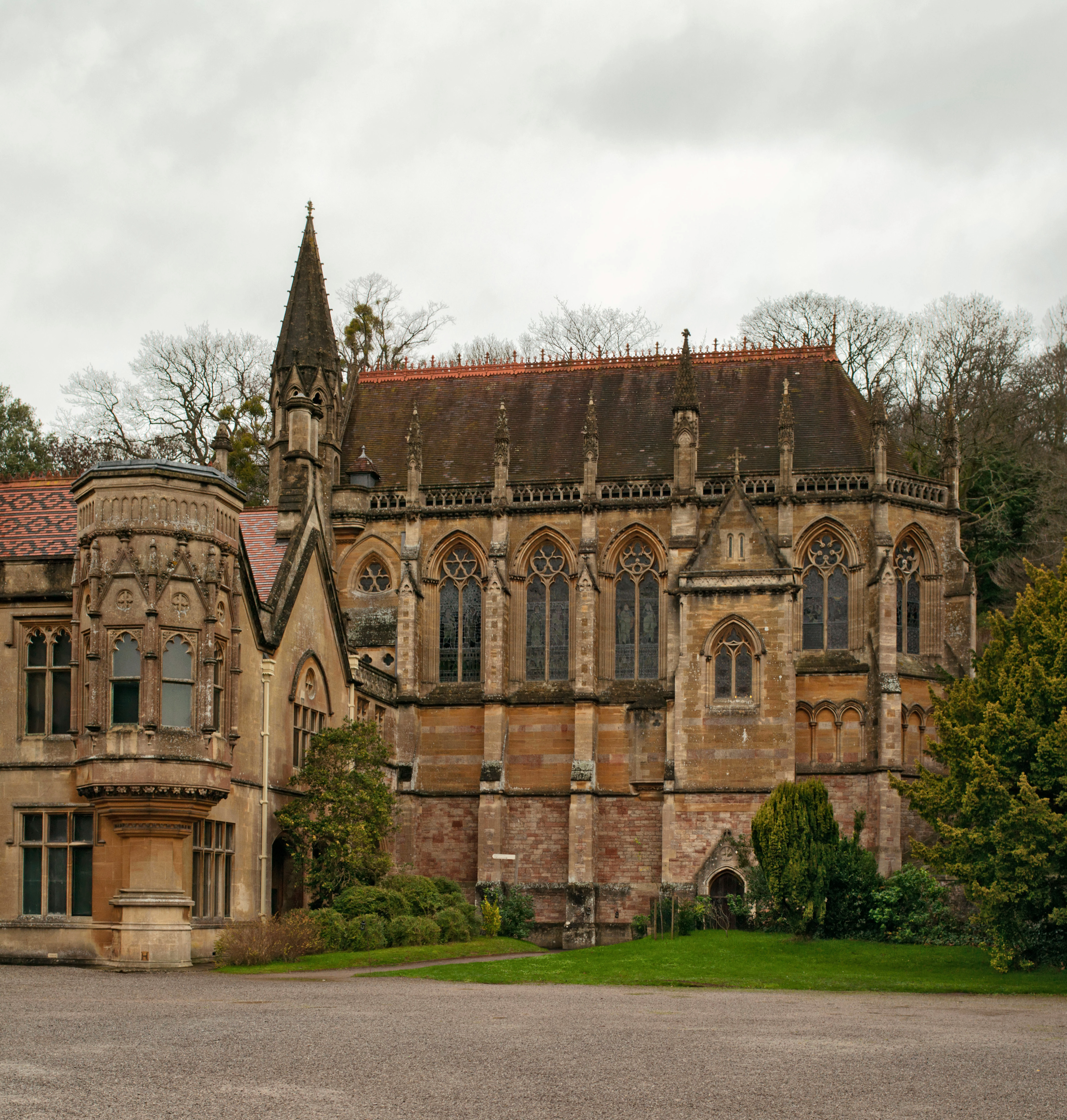
The Arthur Blomfield designed chapel, as viewed from the main entrance courtyard

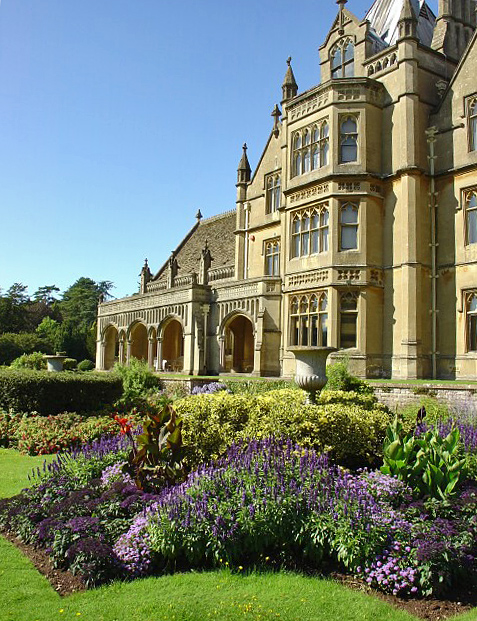
The southside of Tyntesfield, now under the ownership of the National Trust

From the start of his partnership with his brother in the business through to his death, William Gibbs' principal residence was always in London. On marrying, William moved from his brother's house in Bedford Square to 13 Hyde Park Street. The family then moved to Gloucester Place in 1849, and two years later to 16 Hyde Park Gardens, which the family owned until Blanche's death.

However, being a man of substance who travelled regularly to the Port of Bristol on business, he sought out a residence in the area. In 1843, he bought the Tyntes Place estate near Wraxall, Somerset, which lay only 8 miles (13 km) from the centre of Bristol. In 1854 Gibbs commissioned John Gregory Crace to redecorate 16 Hyde Park Gardens, and then extended the contract to Tyntes Place which he renamed Tyntesfield. In both properties principal rooms, Crace installed wood panels and gold inlays, with oil-varnished woodwork and mouldings, and Gothic fireplaces.

Tyntesfield had been demolished and rebuilt only 30 years before Gibbs purchased the property, and then remodelled by Robert Newton of Nailsea shortly before Gibbs purchased it. But between 1863 and 1865, with John Norton as architect and William Cubitt & Co. as builders, the property was substantially remodelled as the benchmark Anglo-Catholic Gothic Revival architecture country house. Norton's design wrapped the original house, adding: two new wings; an extra floor; and towers. Norton, whose designs intended to offer the illusion that the house was the work of several different historical periods, emphasised the restoration of architectural continuity as Gibbs's religious faith emphasised the Church of England's rediscovery of its Catholic traditions. Resultantly, while some walls remained plain others were decorated with a mixture of Gothic and naturalistic carvings. The front and south faces are faced in one shade of Bath Stone, while the rear west facing is faced in a second. Norton topped the design with a concerted effort to dramatically reshape the roof, resulting in an irregularly stepped shape. The result was described by novelist Charlotte Mary Yonge, a cousin of Blanche Gibbs, as "like a church in spirit."

The interiors were equally dramatic. Crace was again engaged to remodel the interiors, in some places extending or adapting his initial works, in others providing new schemes. These were added to by Gibb's extending collection of art works.

After completion of the main building works, Gibbs withdrew more monies by selling shares in Antony Gibbs & Sons, which enabled him to purchase two adjoining properties to create a farming estate, founded on dairy production and forestry management. At its peak, Tyntesfield spanned over 6,000 acres (2,400 ha), encompassing 1,000 acres (400 ha) of forestry, spanning from Portishead in the north to the south of the valley in which the main house lay, and employing more than 250 workers across house and estate.

Gibbs' final addition to Tyntesfield was between 1872 and 1877, when he commissioned Arthur Blomfield to add a dramatic chapel to the north side of the house. It housed an extensive crypt, in which Gibbs intended to be buried. However, combined opposition from both the vicar of the local All Saints Church, Wraxall and the church's patrons, the Gorges family, led to the Bishop of Bath and Wells decreeing that he would not sanction the consecration of Tyntesfield's chapel, through fears that it would take power away from the local population fully into Gibb's hands. Despite this, the chapel formed a central part of life at Tyntesfield, holding twice-daily prayer meetings for the family and their guests, which after evening prayers the patriarch Gibbs in his chair bade each family member and guest goodnight in turn. In praise of the resultant building, Yonge hailed the chapel as the necessary culmination of the Tyntesfield project, giving "a character to the household almost resembling that of" the Little Gidding community much idealised by 19th-century Anglo-Catholics.

== Personal life ==
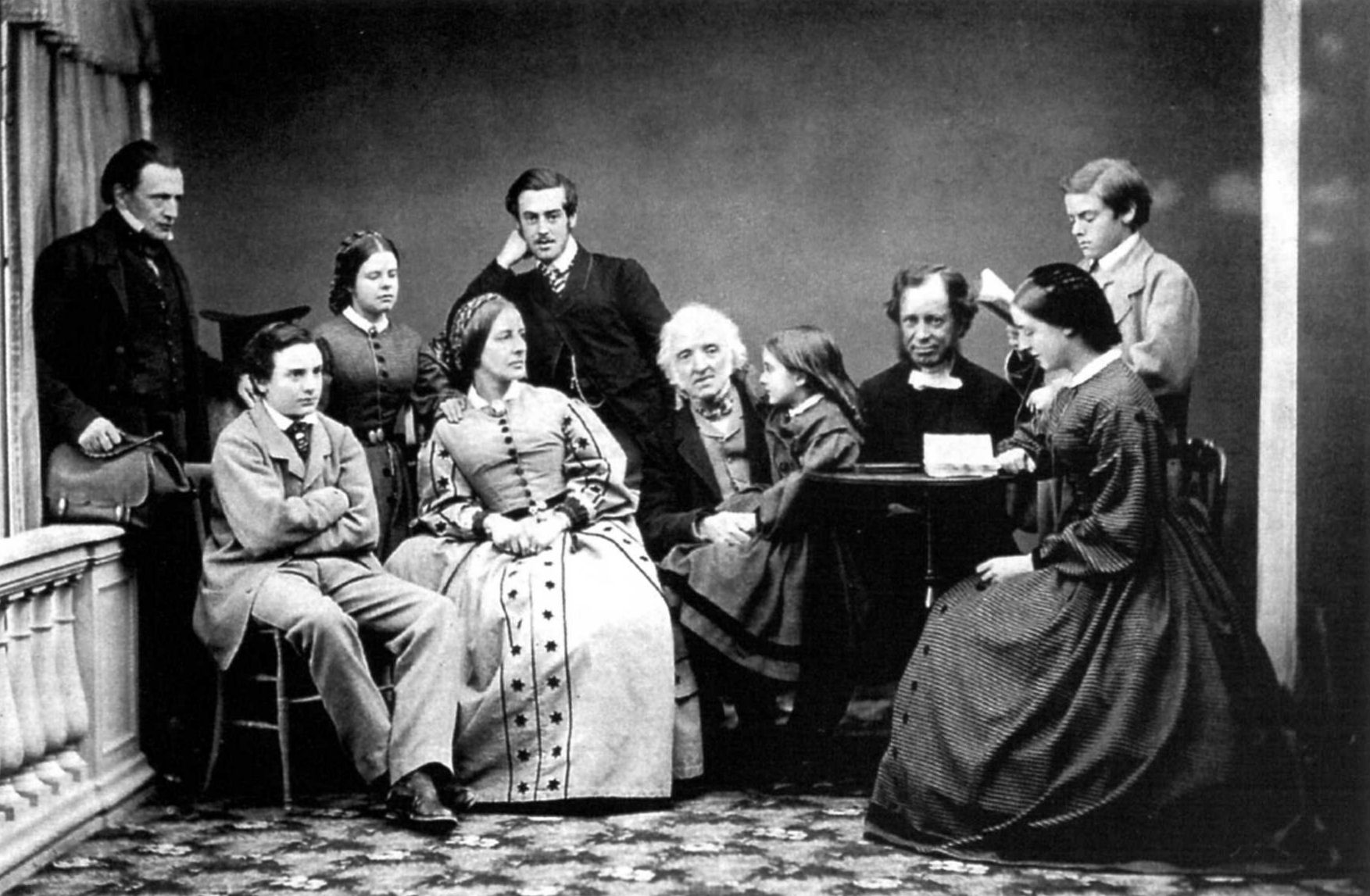
William and Blanche Gibbs with their family, pictured at Tyntesfield in 1862

On 1 August 1839, William married Matilda Blanche Crawley-Boevey at St Mary the Virgin church in Flaxley, Gloucestershire. Born in Gloucester, she was the third and youngest daughter of Sir Thomas Crawley-Boevey, 3rd Baronet (1769–1847), and Mary Albinia (died 1835), eldest daughter of Sir Thomas Hyde Page. Matilda's father was the first cousin of Henry Gibbs's wife, Caroline, and her brother Charles Crawley. The couple had eight children:

- Dorothea Harriett (12 June 1840 – 20 September 1914)
- Antony Gibbs, of Tyntesfield, JP, DL (10 December 1841 – 24 April 1907). He was the father of George Gibbs, 1st Baron Wraxall and father-in-law of Princess Helena of Teck
- Alice Blanche (27 October 1843 – 12 Mar 1871)
- William (14 January 1846 – 11 June 1869)
- George Abraham (25 March 1848 – 23 February 1870)
- Henry Martin (30 May 1850 – 22 April 1928)
- Albinia Anne (7 June 1853 – 17 April 1874)
- Lucey (21 November 1854 - 29 October 1902)

William Gibbs died at Tyntesfield on 3 April 1875. After a service at the chapel within the estate grounds on 9 April, his coffin was carried to the All Saints, Wraxall by relays of thirty estate workers rather than in a carriage. He is buried within the family plot in the church grounds. There is a memorial to William Gibbs contained with St Michael and All Angels Church, Exeter.
