= All Saints Church, Wraxall =

Church in Somerset, England

All Saints' Church
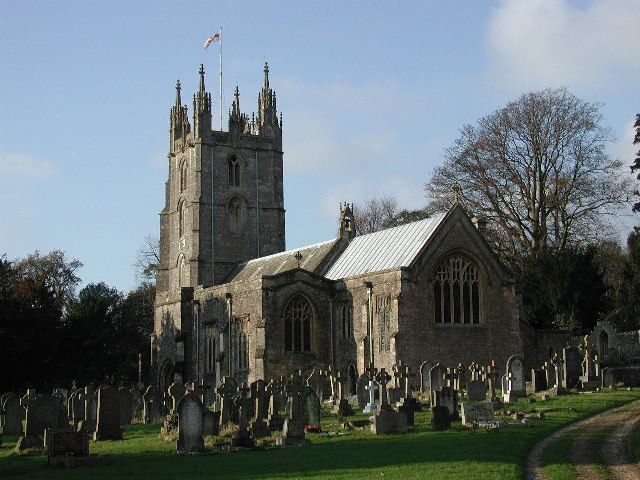

- Location within Somerset

General information
- Location: Wraxall, Somerset, England
- Coordinates: 51.4444°N 2.7348°W
- Completed: 14th century

All Saints' Church is the parish church in Wraxall, Somerset, England. It has been dedicated "to all the Saints". The building is surrounded by an extensive cemetery.

The present building was raised in the 14th century, with tower, clock and bells being added in later centuries. The church has been designated by English Heritage as a Grade I listed building.

Parish registers survive from 1562, and include examples of the baptism of enslaved black people. There are painted stone figures of Sir Edmond Gorges and his wife in the chancel. The nearby rectory was built in the 17th century.

The West Tower, is 85 feet (25.9 m) high, and contains eight bells, three of which date from 1705. The clock face was added in 1730.

The large churchyard contains several monuments to the Gibbs family which owned the nearby Tyntesfield Estate, which has recently been purchased by the National Trust following the death of Baron Wraxall.

== History ==
The southern doorway of the present building was part of a previous building of Norman date. It appears that portions of the chancel, north aisle and south porch were rebuilt at that time. The tower, roofs and windows were apparently rebuilt and enlarged in the fifteenth century. Members of the Gorges family, who were lords of this manor for some 400 years, are buried under the building's floors, although most of their headstones have been moved or destroyed.

In 2006 parish leaders began a project to convert an abandoned school building on the grounds (the Old Georgian School, which opened in 1809) into a new meeting room and parish office, with restrooms, handicapped facilities and a kitchen. The project was estimated to cost £200,000 and was slated to begin in 2009.

== See also ==
- List of Grade I listed buildings in North Somerset
- List of towers in Somerset
- List of ecclesiastical parishes in the Diocese of Bath and Wells
