= Hart, Son, Peard and Co. =

Defunct British architectural metalworkers based in London

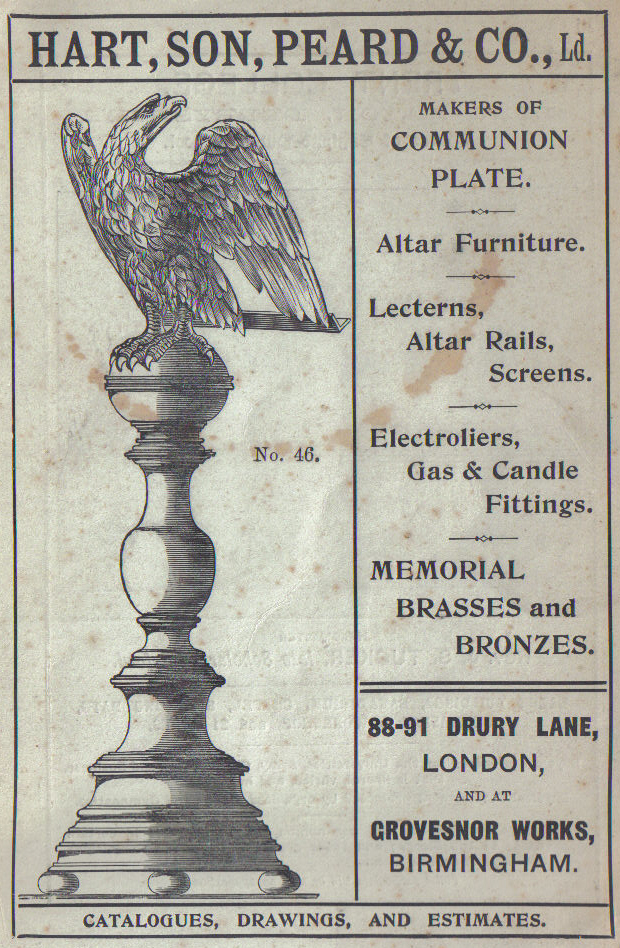
Hart, Son, Peard and Co., advertisement from the Illustrated Guide to the Church Congress, 1897

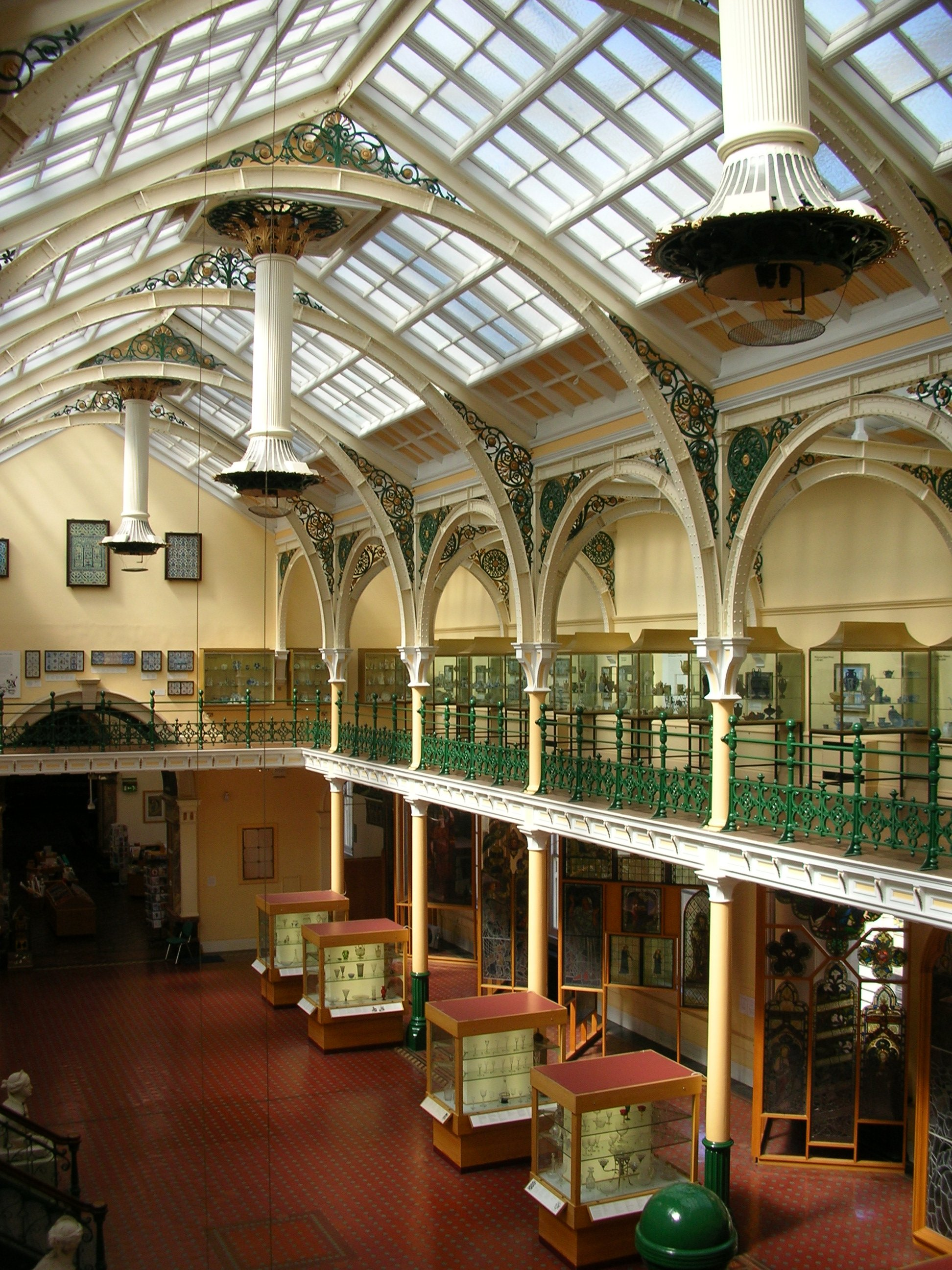
Architectural ironwork exhibition at the Birmingham Museum & Art Gallery. The cast-iron columns and safety rails were made by Hart, Son, Peard & Co

Hart, Son, Peard & Co. (1842–1913) were British architectural metalworkers based in London and Birmingham, most associated with ecclesiastical works.

== Brief overview ==
Founded in 1842 in Wych St, off The Strand, by ironmonger Joseph Hart, they became artistic metalworkers specializing in ecclesiastical manufactures after merging with Birmingham-based Peard & Jackson in 1866–67. Also skilled in sculpture, the firm made designs by J.P. Seddon, B.J. Talbert and Alfred Waterhouse. They made silverwork for William Burges, and in the early 1870s for William Butterfield. The company had an agent, Henri Collet, in Paris.

The company were represented at all the major exhibitions, winning many medals, including at: London (1851, 1862); Paris (1855, 1867, 1878); Dublin (1855, 1865); and Philadelphia (1876).

The firm was disestablished shortly before World War I in 1913.

== Examples of work ==
There are two memorials executed by the firm in Salisbury Cathedral. A brass cross on a marble tablet 1890 to Canon Henry Parry Liddon (1829–1890). and a brass memorial on slate to Admiral John Fulford (1809-1888).
