= St Michael and All Angels Church, Mount Dinham, Exeter =

St Michael and All Angels' Church, Exeter
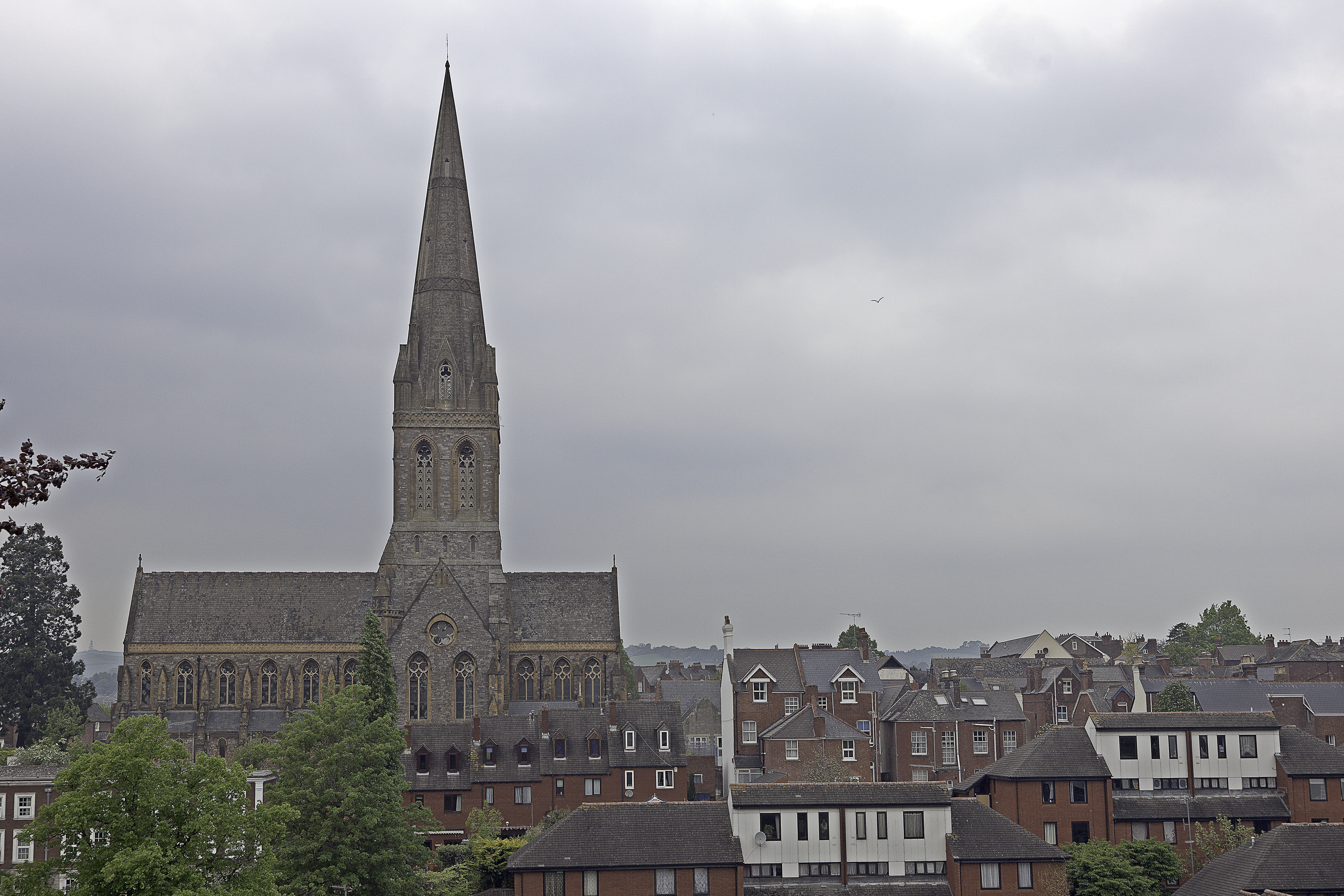
- St Michael and All Angels
- St Michael and All Angels' Church, Exeter
- 50°43′22.8″N 3°32′20.4″W
- OS grid reference: SS 48916 37072
- Location: Exeter
- Country: England
- Denomination: Church of England
- Churchmanship: High Church
- Website: stmichaelsmountdinham.org.uk

History
- Dedication: St Michael and All Angels
- Consecrated: 2 October 1868

Architecture
- Heritage designation: Grade I listed
- Architect: Major Rohde Hawkins
- Architectural type: Early Gothic
- Groundbreaking: 11 August 1865
- Completed: 1868
- Construction cost: £18,000 (equivalent to £1,760,000 in 2025)

Specifications
- Length: 132.5 feet (40.4 m)
- Height: 233 feet (71 m)

Administration
- Province: Canterbury
- Diocese: Exeter
- Archdeaconry: Exeter
- Deanery: Christianity
- Parish: Exeter St David's with St Michael and All Angels

Clergy
- Priest: Revd Tanya Hockley-Still

St Michael and All Angels Church, on Mount Dinham in Exeter is an Anglican church in Devon, England. It is a Grade I listed building. The church is Anglo-Catholic in tradition. The building in is the early Gothic style and was built to the designs of Major Rohde Hawkins, 1867–68. The reredos is by W. D. Caroe, 1899.

Within the Parish of St David with St Michael and All Angels, the building towers above its surroundings, the spire exceeding the height of even the towers of Exeter Cathedral.

== History ==
The foundation stone was laid on 10 August 1865 and construction was largely financed by businessman and Oxford Movement supporter William Gibbs who came from a local family. The church was consecrated on 31 October 1868 by the Bishop of Fredericton.

== Organ ==
The first organ was installed in 1866 and was by William Hill & Son. This was replaced by an organ originally in St Jude's Church, Birmingham, dating from 1867 and built by Edward James Bossward. It was installed and much enlarged by Tim Trenchard in 2013. A specification of the organ can be found on the National Pipe Organ Register.
