= John Norton (architect) =

English architect

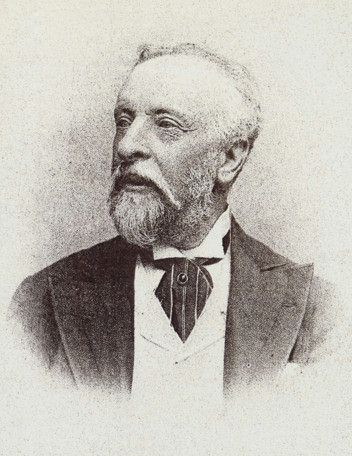
- Born: 28 September 1823
- Died: 10 November 1904 (aged 81)
- Occupation: Architect

John Norton (28 September 1823 – 10 November 1904) was an English architect who designed country houses, churches and a number of commercial buildings.

== Early life ==
Norton was born and educated in Bristol. He became the pupil of architect Benjamin Ferrey (1810–80) in 1846. Ferrey was an early member of the Royal Institute of British Architects and a close friend of the designer Augustus Pugin (1812–52), who took his inspiration from the Gothic medieval styles of the pre-Reformation era. Ferrey's association with Pugin had a profound effect upon Norton, who adopted Pugin's principles and Christian moral dimensions in his own subsequent designs for church architecture. The vital tenets of Pugin's and thus Norton's creed were centred on the revival of the pointed structure of the Gothic arch.

It was argued that only this construction truly symbolised Christian striving towards heaven and Christ's resurrection, Classical architecture having been based on pagan temples. Furthermore, that '...there should be no features about a building which are not necessary for convenience, construction or propriety,...all ornament should consist of enrichment of the essential construction of the building...[and that] in pure architecture the smallest detail should have a meaning or serve a purpose.'

== Career ==
Pugin died in 1852 at the time that Norton, not yet 30, was to embark upon a succession of Gothic revivalist designs for parish churches throughout Somerset. He also worked in Gloucestershire, restoring the 13th-century Church of St Mary and St Peter, Tidenham in 1858. Ferrey had continued to maintain a thriving architectural practice in the west of England and had been appointed honorary architect to the Diocese of Bath and Wells. Norton, although now based in London also maintained a Bristol office.

Norton's association with Sir Peregrine Acland, who donated the £16,000 necessary to rebuild the former mediaeval church of St. Audries, bore further fruit with the commission to design Stogursey School in 1860. This was undertaken by Norton with his now customary flamboyance and dedication to the ideals of Gothic revivalism, and was constructed from local Quantock stone with Bath stone dressings. The school stands in use today.

In accordance with Ferrey and Pugin's prescient concerns for the inter-relationship of humanity and the environment it produces, Norton's designs called for the sourcing of construction materials from their locality. Holy Trinity, Stapleton, was built from pennant stone quarried from nearby Broomhill dressed in stone from Bath. St. Audries from red sandstone quarried from nearby Stampford Brett, and Holy Trinity, Walton, from the hard underlying blue lias, a sedimentary Jurassic limestone quarried from Somerton, just five miles from the church site.

In addition to the regular ecclesiastical commissions, Norton's London practice had designed the grand residences that line Crystal Palace Road in Sydenham. The sale of these properties partly financed the park which had been laid out to display Paxton's Crystal Palace, reconstructed from the Great Exhibition of 1851.

== Work on country residences ==
Later that decade, Norton's reputation was enhanced with commissions to build Nutley Priory near Redhill, (Surrey), for the banker E.H.Gurney, Brent Knoll in the West Country for G.S.Poole, and Chewton Magna Manor for W.Adlam.

John Norton's greatest commission was now on the horizon. William Gibbs (1790–1875) had become a partner in the family trading company and by the time of Queen Victoria's accession in 1837 had, with his brother Henry, circumspectly steered their business through the French Wars and the dissolution of Spanish colonial interests. William became sole owner in 1842 and the following 40 years produced annual profits that would have reached beyond his ancestors' imagining. Gibbs' Peruvian office had secured contracts for the export to Britain of guano, the nitrogen-rich deposits of seabird droppings that became a principal fertiliser for the increase of wheat yields.

William Gibbs now required a country seat for his family away from London and in 1843 purchased Tyntes Place, an attractive house with relatively simple and plain internal decoration that overlooked the Bristol Channel. The house had been rebuilt to the conservative tastes of a Reverend Seymour and further improved by Nailsea architect Robert Newton after 1836. During the 1850s the celebrated designer John Gregory Crace (1809–89), who had worked closely with Augustus Pugin, was commissioned by Gibbs to make improvements to the London house at 16 Hyde Park Gardens, and also to refurbish Tyntesfield House, as it was now officially referred to.

Norton was first invited to Tyntesfield on 21 August 1860, when Gibbs outlined his needs for further expansion to his country seat. The meeting went well and in March the following year, with fellow ecclesiastical architect Rohde Hawkins, introductions were made to the builders William Cubitt & Co. in London, and meetings held with senior partner George Plucknett. It was Plucknett who held the responsibility for executing Norton's designs. Cubitts had built Osborne House for Queen Victoria on the Isle of Wight, and thus came with the highest recommendations.

Norton's dramatic designs were completed by 1863 and the extensive re-modelling of Tyntesfield commenced in October. The building work took over two years and was completed close to the £70,000 budget allowed for it. Reverend Seymour's restrained Regency house had been utterly absorbed, doubled in size and transformed into a soaring Gothic-revival masterpiece bristling with ornamentation born from its diverse construction elements. Though quite new, the range of buildings gave the appearance of having grown over a much longer period of time. Pinnacles, gables, crenellated towers, stained glass, plain glass and leaded light windows harmonised in a testimony to Norton's visionary skills and balance, and Plucknett's craftmanship.

The interiors of the vast house were just as breathtaking. 'Norton's creation was quite extraordinary. He had combined the Gothic beauty of holiness with a reverence for nature. He created domestic architecture based on the recent collegiate buildings in Oxford. Suddenly, too, the tenets of Ruskin and Pugin have become transfixed in stone.'

Tyntesfield remains at the zenith of Norton's designs but his architectural practice continued the ecclesiastical, country house and suburban output for which he was now rightly celebrated. St John the Evangelist's in Middlesbrough dates from 1865. Between 1866 and 1875 Norton built and restored parish churches in South Wales: St. David's, Neath,(1866), St. Matthew, Llanelwydd and the parish church of Builth Wells, (1870). In 1875, he re-designed the west wall of St. Thomas the Apostle, Redwick, Newport, inserting a large window.

Norton's occasional forays into suburban architecture, notably Berkeley Square, Clifton, and the Crystal Palace estate designs, re-emerged in 1871 when the south side of Crystal Palace Park was developed and Norton's London practice designed a series of houses.

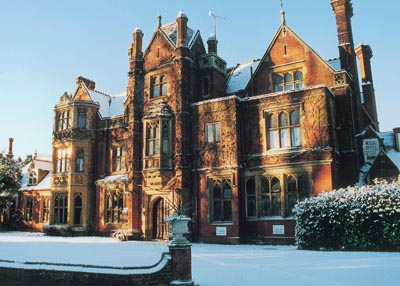
Dalewood House in winter

From 1867–72, he lived at nearby Lichfield House, a house he designed together with its neighbour Eardley House owned by Charles Umney of Wright, Layman and Umney, manufacturers of Wright's Coal Tar Soap. In 1873 he moved to 'St. Helens' 55 Crystal Palace Road where he remained until 1881. Norton also continued with his country house commissions and in 1884, re-modelled and enlarged Badgemore House, west of Henley in Oxfordshire for Richard Ovey. During this period he designed Dalewood House in Mickleham, Surrey. The house now serves as the main building of Box Hill School a Public School in the village which was established in 1959 by Roy McComish, a former house master and art master at Gordonstoun School who developed the school under the same principles as Gordonstoun's founder Kurt Hahn

Norton returned to South Wales in 1887 to design Gwyn Hall, the principal civic building and music hall for Neath Port Talbot. This handsome structure with its fine windows and trademark colonnade of Gothic arches cost £6,000 to design and build. It was recently undergoing a £4 million facelift when a fire gutted the building in 2007. Fortunately, Norton's exterior has mostly survived.

In the 1890s, Norton was commissioned to design Saint Helen's Church, Lundy Island, by the then owner, the Rev'd Hudson Grosset Heaven. St Helen's stands prominently on the top of the island and, visible from the sea on all sides, is the island's most conspicuous landmark. The church is built largely of Lundy granite and the 65-foot-high tower houses 8 bells. The high church interior of polychromed brick is enhanced by some good stained glass (though the fine east window has been partially blocked up due to weather damage) and a beautiful reredos of carved alabaster by Harry Hems of Exeter. St Helen's was completed in 1896 and consecrated by the Bishop of Exeter in 1897.

Other than his dynamic, traditional Christian faith and the references from William Gibbs' business-like diary, which note his satisfaction as to the progress at Tyntesfield, we know little of John Norton's personality. One intriguing and revealing insight however is illuminated from the autobiography of the great author Thomas Hardy (1840–1928). Norton's London practice was in Old Bond Street, and in April 1862, despite being fully staffed he agreed that the young Hardy, who at the time sought apprenticeship in architecture,'...should come daily to the office and make drawings'. The biography, (penned in fact by Hardy's second wife Florence), records that, 'he proved himself to be one of the best helps Hardy ever had'

Other projects he was associated with include Berkeley Square, Bristol, for which in 1851 he made the replica of the Bristol High Cross which stands in the square; the Manor House in Chew Magna; St Audries Park; the college of St Matthias, Bristol; and Christ Church, Clifton Down, Bristol. This church was built by Charles Dyer in 1841. Norton added the steeple, which reaches 65 metres (213 ft), in 1859.

Norton died on 10 November 1904 and was buried in Bournemouth, Dorset.

== Sources ==
- Miller J. (2003) 'Fertile Fortune: The Story of Tyntesfield' (London: The National Trust)
- Hardy, T.& F. (1928/2007) 'Wordsworth Literary Lives: Thomas Hardy' (Ware: Wordsworth Editions)
- Pugin A.W.N. (1841/2003) 'The True Principles of Pointed or Christian Architecture Set Forth (intro. T.Brittain-Catlin), (Reading: SpireBooks).
- https://www.British-history.ac.uk/report.aspx?compid=18613 (and 40908)
- http://www.communigate.co.uk/dorset/dhs/page13.phtml%5B%5D
- http://www.cpat.demon.co.uk/projects/longer/churches/radnor/16845%5B%5D
- http://history.powys.org.uk/school1/builth/church.shtml
- https://web.archive.org/web/20100923104803/http://www.holytrinitystapleton.org.uk/history.htm
- https://web.archive.org/web/20080708145128/http://www.ideal-homes.org.uk/bromley/beckenham/crystal-palace-park-road.htm
- https://web.archive.org/web/20080517211251/http://www.neath-porttalbot.gov.uk/gwynhall/
- http://www.newport.gov.ukwww.openchurchestrust.org.uk/Churches/Kilton.htm%5B%5D
- https://web.archive.org/web/20090107020147/http://www.oxfordshirepast.net/hen_ests.html
- https://www.stjohnshighbridge.org.uk
- https://web.archive.org/web/20080724182034/http://www.streetandwalton.co.uk/church/groups.php
- https://web.archive.org/web/20110516173413/http://www.touruk.co.uk/houses/Tyntesfield-North-Somerset.htm
- https://www.westburychurch.com
