= Baron Wraxall =

Title in the Peerage of the United Kingdom

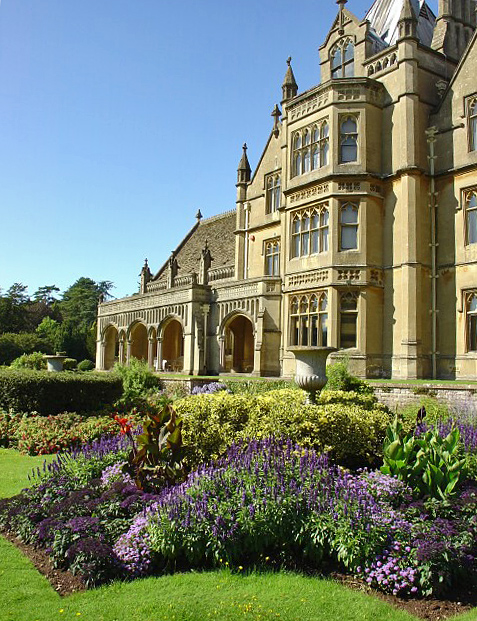
Tyntesfield, the former seat of the Gibbs family.

Baron Wraxall, of Clyst St George in the County of Devon, is a title in the Peerage of the United Kingdom. It was created in 1928 for the Conservative politician George Gibbs. As of 2017, the title is held by his grandson, the fourth Baron, who succeeded his father, a former diplomat, in that year. The Barons Wraxall are slightly related to the Barons Aldenham and Barons Hunsdon of Hunsdon. The first Baron's grandfather William Gibbs was the younger brother of George Henry Gibbs, the father of Hucks Gibbs, 1st Baron Aldenham, whose fourth son was Herbert Gibbs, 1st Baron Hunsdon of Hunsdon. The wife of the brother of the first Baron Wraxhall was Lady Helena Cambridge (born Princess Helena of Teck), a niece of Queen Mary and descendant of King George III.

The family seat was at Tyntesfield, near Wraxall, Somerset, which is now owned and administered by The National Trust.

== Barons Wraxall (1928) ==
- George Abraham Gibbs, 1st Baron Wraxall (1873–1931)
- (George) Richard Lawley Gibbs, 2nd Baron Wraxall (1928–2001)
- Eustace Hubert Beilby Gibbs, 3rd Baron Wraxall (1929–2017)
- Antony Hubert Gibbs, 4th Baron Wraxall (born 1958)

The current heir apparent is the present holder's son, the Hon. Orlando Hubert Gibbs (born 1995).

=== Title succession chart ===
Title succession chart: Barons Aldenham, Barons Hunsdon of Hunsdon, and Barons Wraxall

Antony Gibbs; 1756–1815
George Henry Gibbs; 1785–1842	William Gibbs; 1790–1875
Baron Aldenham
(Henry) Hucks Gibbs; 1st Baron Aldenham; 1819–1907	Antony Gibbs; 1841–1907
Baron Hunsdon of Hunsdon	Baron Wraxall
Alban George Henry Gibbs; 2nd Baron Aldenham; 1846–1936	Walter Gibbs; 1850–1858	Vicary Gibbs; 1853–1932	Herbert Cokayne Gibbs; 1st Baron Hunsdon of Hunsdon; 1854–1935	George Abraham Gibbs; 1st Baron Wraxall; 1873–1931
Gerald Henry Beresford Gibbs; 3rd Baron Aldenham; 1879–1939	Walter Durant Gibbs; 4th Baron Aldenham; 2nd Baron Hunsdon of Hunsdon; 1888–1969	George Gibbs; 1911–1911	Antony Gibbs; 1916–1916	(George) Richard Lawley Gibbs; 2nd Baron Wraxall; 1928–2001	Eustace Hubert Beilby Gibbs; 3rd Baron Wraxall; 1929–2017
Capt. Vicary Gibbs; 1921–1944	Antony Durant Gibbs; 5th Baron Aldenham; 3rd Baron Hunsdon of Hunsdon; 1922–1986	Antony Hubert Gibbs; 4th Baron Wraxall b. 1958
Vicary Tyser Gibbs; 6th Baron Aldenham; 4th Baron Hunsdon of Hunsdon b. 1948	Orlando Hubert Gibbs b. 1995
Humphrey Gibbs b. 1989

== See also ==
- Baron Aldenham
- Baron Hunsdon of Hunsdon
