= Baron Hunsdon =

Extinct barony in the Peerage of England

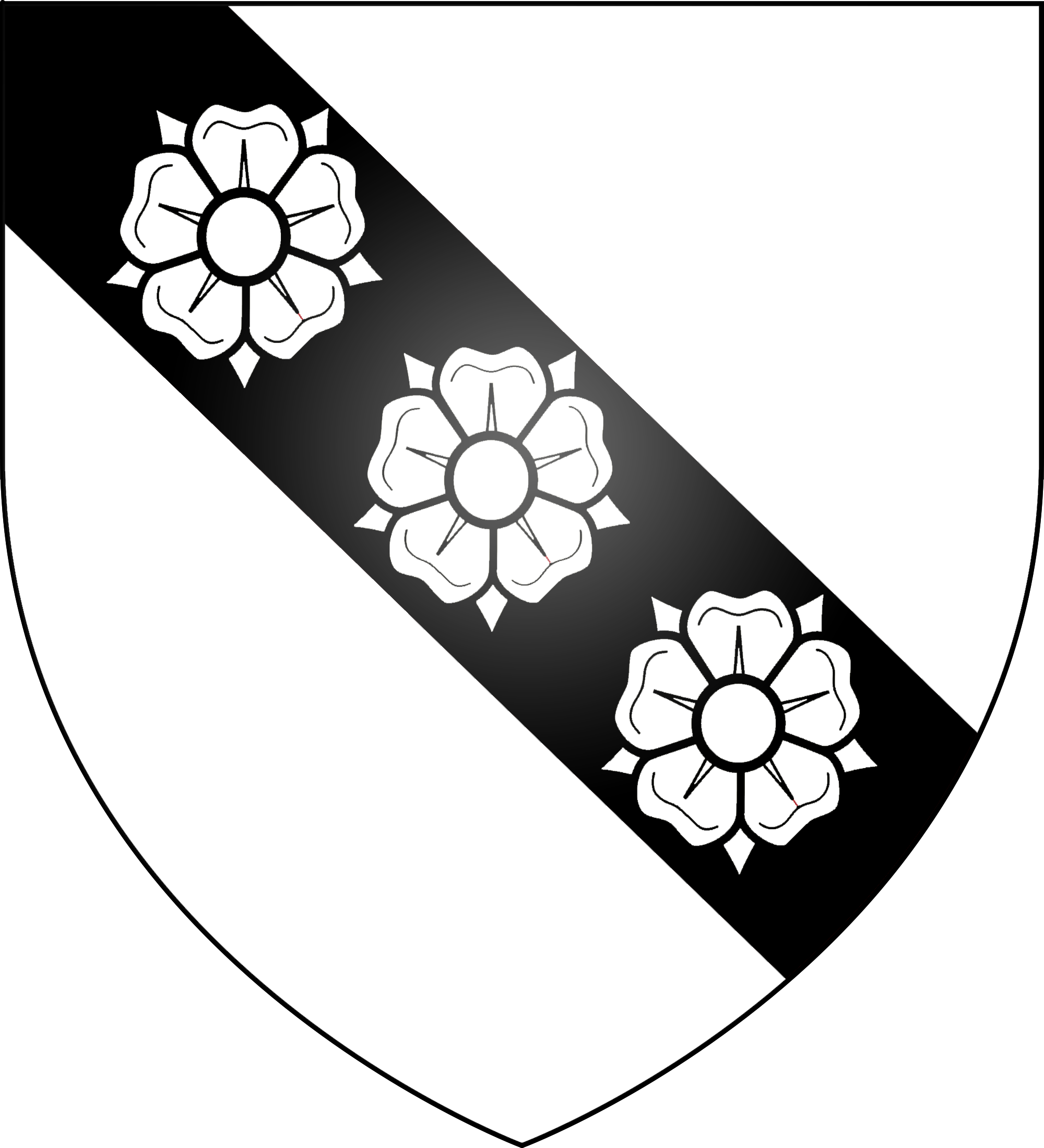
Arms of Carey: Argent, on a bend sable three roses of the field.

Baron Hunsdon is a title that has been created three times.

It was first created in 1559 in the Peerage of England for the soldier and courtier Henry Carey. His grandson, the fourth Baron, was created Viscount Rochford in 1621 and Earl of Dover, in the County of Kent, in 1628. These titles were also in the Peerage of England. He was succeeded by his son, the second Earl. He had already in 1640 been summoned to the House of Lords through a writ of acceleration in his father's barony of Hunsdon. However, on his death in 1677, the viscountcy and earldom became extinct. The barony passed to his second cousin once removed, the sixth Baron. He was the great-grandson of Sir Edmund Carey, the younger son of the first Baron. On his death, the title passed to his first cousin, the seventh Baron. He died unmarried and was succeeded by his first cousin once removed, the eighth Baron. On the latter's death in 1765, the barony became extinct as well.

The second creation was in 1832 in the Peerage of the United Kingdom. Lucius Cary, 10th Viscount Falkland, a peer of Scotland, was created Baron Hunsdon, of Scutterskelfe in the county of York. This title became extinct on his death in 1884.

The title was created again in 1923 in the Peerage of the United Kingdom. The barony was revived for the businessman Herbert Gibbs, who was made Baron Hunsdon of Hunsdon, of Briggens in the County of Hertford. Gibbs was the fourth son of Hucks Gibbs, 1st Baron Aldenham (see the Baron Aldenham for earlier history of the family). He was a partner in the family firm of Antony Gibbs & Sons, and also served as Chairman of the Public Works Loan Board. In 1908, Gibbs acquired Hunsdon House and the Briggens estate in Hertfordshire. He was succeeded by his son, the second Baron, who in 1939 also succeeded his childless cousin in the Aldenham barony (see title succession chart below). The two baronies remain united.

== Barons Hunsdon, first creation (1559) ==
- Henry Carey, 1st Baron Hunsdon (1526–1596)
- George Carey, 2nd Baron Hunsdon (1547–1603)
- John Carey, 3rd Baron Hunsdon (c. 1556 – 1617)
  - Henry Carey (1577–1577)
- Henry Carey, 4th Baron Hunsdon (c. 1580 – 1666, created Viscount Rochford in 1621)

=== Viscounts Rochford (1621) ===
- Henry Carey, 1st Viscount Rochford (c. 1580 – 1666, created Earl of Dover in 1628)

=== Earls of Dover (1628) ===
- Henry Carey, 1st Earl of Dover (c. 1580 – 1666)
- John Carey, 2nd Earl of Dover (1608–1677)

At the death of the 2nd Earl, the viscountcy and the earldom became extinct.

=== Barons Hunsdon, first creation (1559; reverted) ===
- Robert Carey, 6th Baron Hunsdon (b. 1652 – 1692)
- Robert Carey, 7th Baron Hunsdon (b. 1649 – 1702)
- William Ferdinand Carey, 8th Baron Hunsdon (1684–1765)

At the death of the 8th Baron, the barony became extinct.

=== Title succession chart ===
Title succession chart, Barons Hunsdon (first creation), Viscounts Rochford and Earls of Dover.

Henry Carey; 1st Baron Hunsdon; 1526–1596
George Carey; 2nd Baron Hunsdon; 1547–1603	John Carey; 3rd Baron Hunsdon c. 1556 – 1617	Sir Edmund Carey; 1558–1637
Viscount Rochford; Earl of Dover
Henry Carey; 1577–1577	Henry Carey; 1st Earl of Dover; 4th Baron Hunsdon c. 1580 – 1666	Sir Robert Carey; 1582/1583 – ?	Sir Ferdinando Carey; 1590–1638	Thomas Carey
John Carey; 2nd Earl of Dover; 5th Baron Hunsdon; 1608–1677	Col. Sir Horatio Carey b. 1619 – a. 1652	Ernestus Carey; 1621–1680	Lt. Col. Ferdinando Carey; 1625–1662
Viscountcy and earldom extinct
Col. Robert Carey; 6th Baron Hunsdon b. 1652 – 1692	Robert Carey; 7th Baron Hunsdon b. 1649 – 1702	William Carey died 1683
William Carey; 8th Baron Hunsdon; 1684–1765
Barony extinct

== Barons Hunsdon, second creation (1832) ==
- Lucius Bentinck Cary, 10th Viscount Falkland (1803–1884) (created Baron Hunsdon [UK] in 1832)

== Barons Hunsdon of Hunsdon, third creation (1923) ==
- Herbert Cokayne Gibbs, 1st Baron Hunsdon (1854–1935)
- Walter Durant Gibbs, 2nd Baron Hunsdon (1888–1969, succeeded as Baron Aldenham in 1939)

=== Title succession chart ===
Title succession chart: Barons Aldenham, Barons Hunsdon of Hunsdon, and Barons Wraxall

Antony Gibbs; 1756–1815
George Henry Gibbs; 1785–1842	William Gibbs; 1790–1875
Baron Aldenham
(Henry) Hucks Gibbs; 1st Baron Aldenham; 1819–1907	Antony Gibbs; 1841–1907
Baron Hunsdon of Hunsdon	Baron Wraxall
Alban George Henry Gibbs; 2nd Baron Aldenham; 1846–1936	Walter Gibbs; 1850–1858	Vicary Gibbs; 1853–1932	Herbert Cokayne Gibbs; 1st Baron Hunsdon of Hunsdon; 1854–1935	George Abraham Gibbs; 1st Baron Wraxall; 1873–1931
Gerald Henry Beresford Gibbs; 3rd Baron Aldenham; 1879–1939	Walter Durant Gibbs; 4th Baron Aldenham; 2nd Baron Hunsdon of Hunsdon; 1888–1969	George Gibbs; 1911–1911	Antony Gibbs; 1916–1916	(George) Richard Lawley Gibbs; 2nd Baron Wraxall; 1928–2001	Eustace Hubert Beilby Gibbs; 3rd Baron Wraxall; 1929–2017
Capt. Vicary Gibbs; 1921–1944	Antony Durant Gibbs; 5th Baron Aldenham; 3rd Baron Hunsdon of Hunsdon; 1922–1986	Antony Hubert Gibbs; 4th Baron Wraxall b. 1958
Vicary Tyser Gibbs; 6th Baron Aldenham; 4th Baron Hunsdon of Hunsdon b. 1948	Orlando Hubert Gibbs b. 1995
Humphrey Gibbs b. 1989

== See also ==
- Baron Wraxall
