= Baron Aldenham =

Title in the Peerage of the United Kingdom

Baron Aldenham, of Aldenham in the county of Hertfordshire, is a title in the Peerage of the United Kingdom that was created on 31 January 1896 for the businessman Hucks Gibbs. He was head of the family firm of Antony Gibbs & Sons (founded by his grandfather Antony Gibbs) and a director and Governor of the Bank of England. Gibbs also briefly sat as a Conservative Member of Parliament for the City of London. His fourth son Herbert Cokayne Gibbs was created Baron Hunsdon of Hunsdon in 1923 (see below).

Lord Aldenham was succeeded by his eldest son, the second Baron. He also represented the City of London in the House of Commons as a Conservative. He was succeeded by his son, the third Baron. On the latter's death in 1939 the barony of Aldenham was inherited by his cousin the second Baron Hunsdon of Hunsdon (see Baron Hunsdon for earlier history of this title). He served as chairman of Antony Gibbs & Sons. As of 2017 the titles are held by his grandson, the sixth Baron, who succeeded his father in 1986.

Another member of the family to gain distinction was Vicary Gibbs, third son of the first Baron. He was Conservative Member of Parliament for St Albans.

The Barons Wraxall are members of another branch of the Gibbs family; their seat was at Tyntesfield. George Henry Gibbs, father of the first Baron Aldenham, was the elder brother of William Gibbs, grandfather of George Gibbs, 1st Baron Wraxall.

The family seat is Holwell Manor, near Sherborne, Dorset.

== Barons Aldenham (1896) ==
- (Henry) Hucks Gibbs, 1st Baron Aldenham (1819–1907)
- Alban George Henry Gibbs, 2nd Baron Aldenham (1846–1936)
- Gerald Henry Beresford Gibbs, 3rd Baron Aldenham (1879–1939)
- Walter Durant Gibbs, 4th Baron Aldenham, 2nd Baron Hunsdon of Hunsdon (1888–1969)
- Antony Durant Gibbs, 5th Baron Aldenham, 3rd Baron Hunsdon of Hunsdon (1922–1986)
- Vicary Tyser Gibbs, 6th Baron Aldenham, 4th Baron Hunsdon of Hunsdon (born 1948)

The heir apparent is the present holder's son, the Hon. Humphrey William Fell Gibbs (born 1989).

== Title succession chart ==
Title succession chart: Barons Aldenham, Barons Hunsdon of Hunsdon, and Barons Wraxall

Antony Gibbs; 1756–1815
George Henry Gibbs; 1785–1842	William Gibbs; 1790–1875
Baron Aldenham
(Henry) Hucks Gibbs; 1st Baron Aldenham; 1819–1907	Antony Gibbs; 1841–1907
Baron Hunsdon of Hunsdon	Baron Wraxall
Alban George Henry Gibbs; 2nd Baron Aldenham; 1846–1936	Walter Gibbs; 1850–1858	Vicary Gibbs; 1853–1932	Herbert Cokayne Gibbs; 1st Baron Hunsdon of Hunsdon; 1854–1935	George Abraham Gibbs; 1st Baron Wraxall; 1873–1931
Gerald Henry Beresford Gibbs; 3rd Baron Aldenham; 1879–1939	Walter Durant Gibbs; 4th Baron Aldenham; 2nd Baron Hunsdon of Hunsdon; 1888–1969	George Gibbs; 1911–1911	Antony Gibbs; 1916–1916	(George) Richard Lawley Gibbs; 2nd Baron Wraxall; 1928–2001	Eustace Hubert Beilby Gibbs; 3rd Baron Wraxall; 1929–2017
Capt. Vicary Gibbs; 1921–1944	Antony Durant Gibbs; 5th Baron Aldenham; 3rd Baron Hunsdon of Hunsdon; 1922–1986	Antony Hubert Gibbs; 4th Baron Wraxall b. 1958
Vicary Tyser Gibbs; 6th Baron Aldenham; 4th Baron Hunsdon of Hunsdon b. 1948	Orlando Hubert Gibbs b. 1995
Humphrey Gibbs b. 1989

== Arms ==
Coat of arms of Baron Aldenham
Notes Arms, crest, and supporters as recorded in Debrett's Peerage and Titles of Courtesy (1921). Crest In front of a rock, a right arm bent at the elbow, armoured, the hand in a gauntlet, holding a battle-axe slanting downward to the viewer's left, all in black. Escutcheon Silver, three upright battle-axes, all enclosed by a black nebuly (cloud-edged) border. Supporters On either side, a man dressed in buff-coloured leather jerkin, gloves, and boots, armed with a three-barred helmet, long gorget, and sword, all in natural colours, each holding a battle-axe over the outer shoulder in black.

== See also ==
- Baron Hunsdon of Hunsdon
- Baron Wraxall
