= Vicary Gibbs =

Vicary Gibbs may refer to:

- Vicary Gibbs (judge) (1751–1820), English barrister, judge and politician
- Vicary Gibbs, 6th Baron Aldenham (born 1948), British peer
- Vicary Gibbs (St Albans MP) (1853–1932), British barrister, merchant, politician, and editor
