= Clifton Hampden Manor =

Manor house in Clifton Hampden, Oxfordshire, England

Coordinates: 51°39′23″N 1°12′32″W

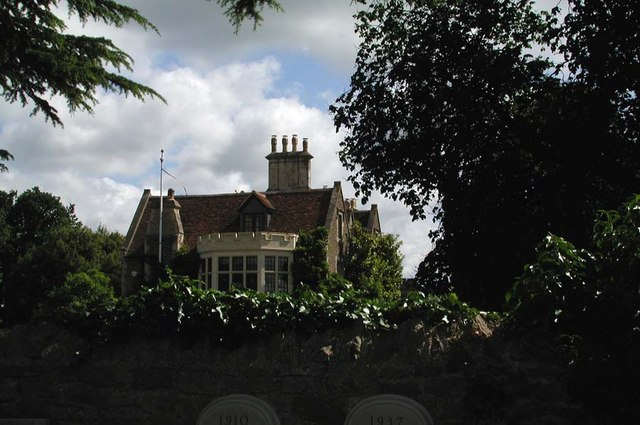
Clifton Hampden Manor viewed from the church, 2004

Clifton Hampden Manor is a country house in the village of Clifton Hampden, Oxfordshire, England, overlooking the River Thames. It has been a Grade II listed building since 1987.

It was built by Sir Gilbert Scott about 1843–46 as a parsonage for Henry Hucks Gibbs, who in 1896 became Hucks Gibbs, 1st Baron Aldenham. It was soon extended, probably by Charles Buckeridge, for the Revd. J.L. Gibbs.

In 2000, a descendant, the antiques dealer and collector and 60s figure Christopher Gibbs reluctantly sold the house, and Christie's auctioned off the contents over two days.

The house is now owned by the singer-songwriter Kate Bush.
