= Whidborne =

Whidborne is a surname. Notable people with the surname include:

- Timothy Whidborne (1927–2021), British artist
- Josh Whidborne (born 1989), English ice dancer

== See also ==
- George Ferris Whidborne Mortimer (1805–1871), English schoolmaster
