= Roger Gibbs =

British businessman (1934 – 2018)

Sir Roger Gibbs HonFRCP, HonFMedSci
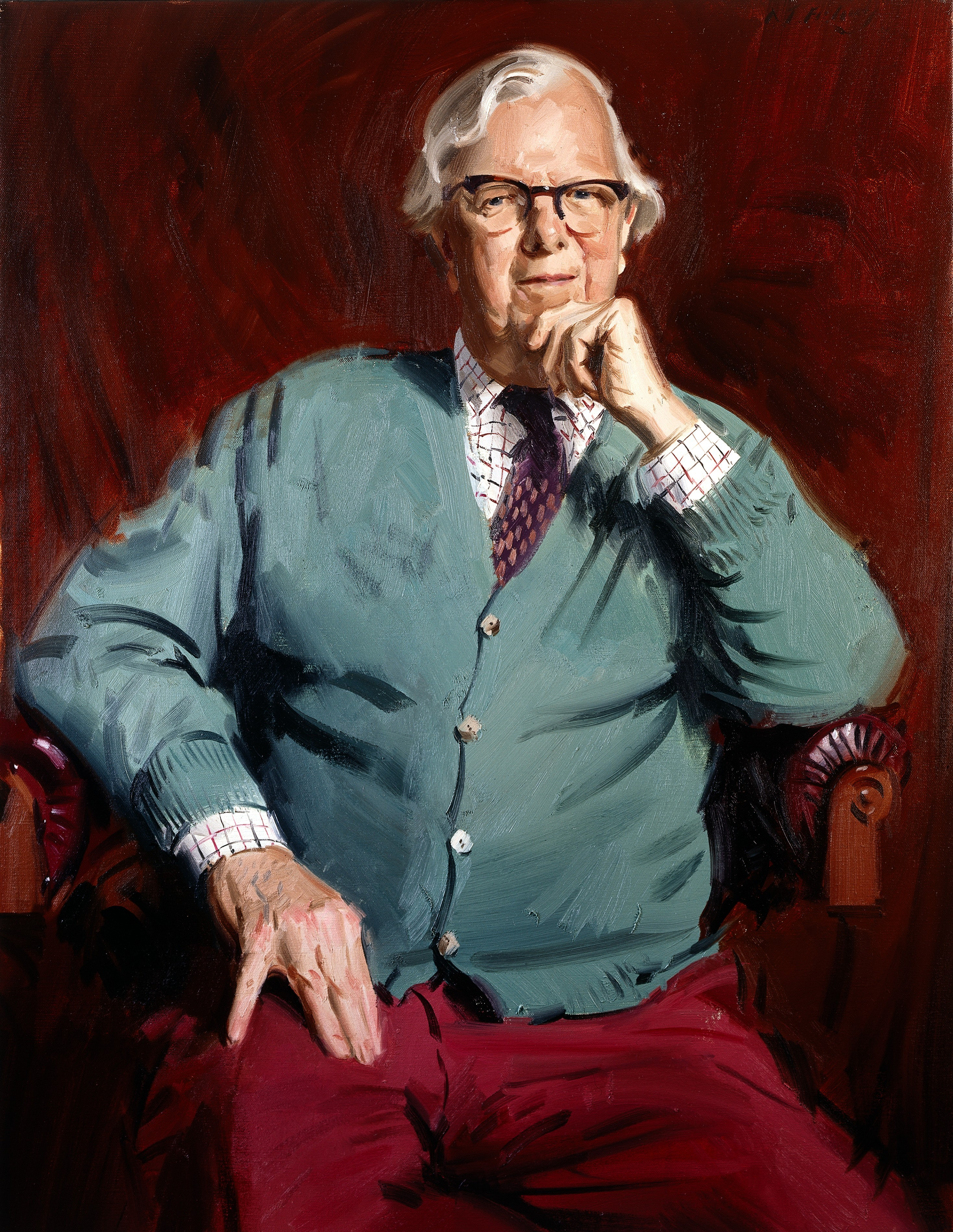
- Sir Roger Gibbs by Andrew Festing, 2000
- Born: 13 October 1934
- Died: 3 October 2018 (aged 83)
- Education: Eton College; Millfield
- Employers: Gerrard and National Discount Co Ltd; Arsenal Football Club; Wellcome Trust
- Spouse: Jane Gibbs (m. 2005)
- Relatives: Herbert Gibbs, 1st Baron Hunsdon of Hunsdon (grandfather); Christopher Gibbs (brother)

Sir Roger Geoffrey Gibbs, HonFRCP, HonFMedSci (13 October 1934 – 3 October 2018) was a British financier who held senior positions on the board of directors of Arsenal Football Club, the Wellcome Trust and Fleming Family & Partners.

== Education ==
Gibbs was educated at Eton College and Millfield.

== Career ==
After a career as a stockbroker he was Chairman of Gerrard and National Discount Co Ltd. He was a non executive Director of Arsenal Football Club between 1980 and 2005. He retired from the club's board in June 2006. He was also Chairman of the Wellcome Trust between 1983 and 1999. He took an active part in charity work and was Chairman of the St Paul's Cathedral Foundation.

== Honours and awards ==
Gibbs was knighted in 1994. He was made an honorary fellow of the Academy of Medical Sciences in 2003. In 2004, The Wellcome Trust named its new headquarters on the Euston Road the Gibbs Building to honour the significant contributions he made to the trusts finances.

== Personal life ==
Gibbs was the fourth son of Sir Geoffrey Gibbs, KCMG, and Lady Gibbs, CBE. His younger brother, Christopher (1938–2018), was an antiques dealer and collector. He married his wife, Jane, on 21 September 2005.

He died on 3 October 2018 at the age of 83.
