= Hanson baronets of Bryanston Square (1887) =

Escutcheon of the Hanson baronets of Bryanston Square

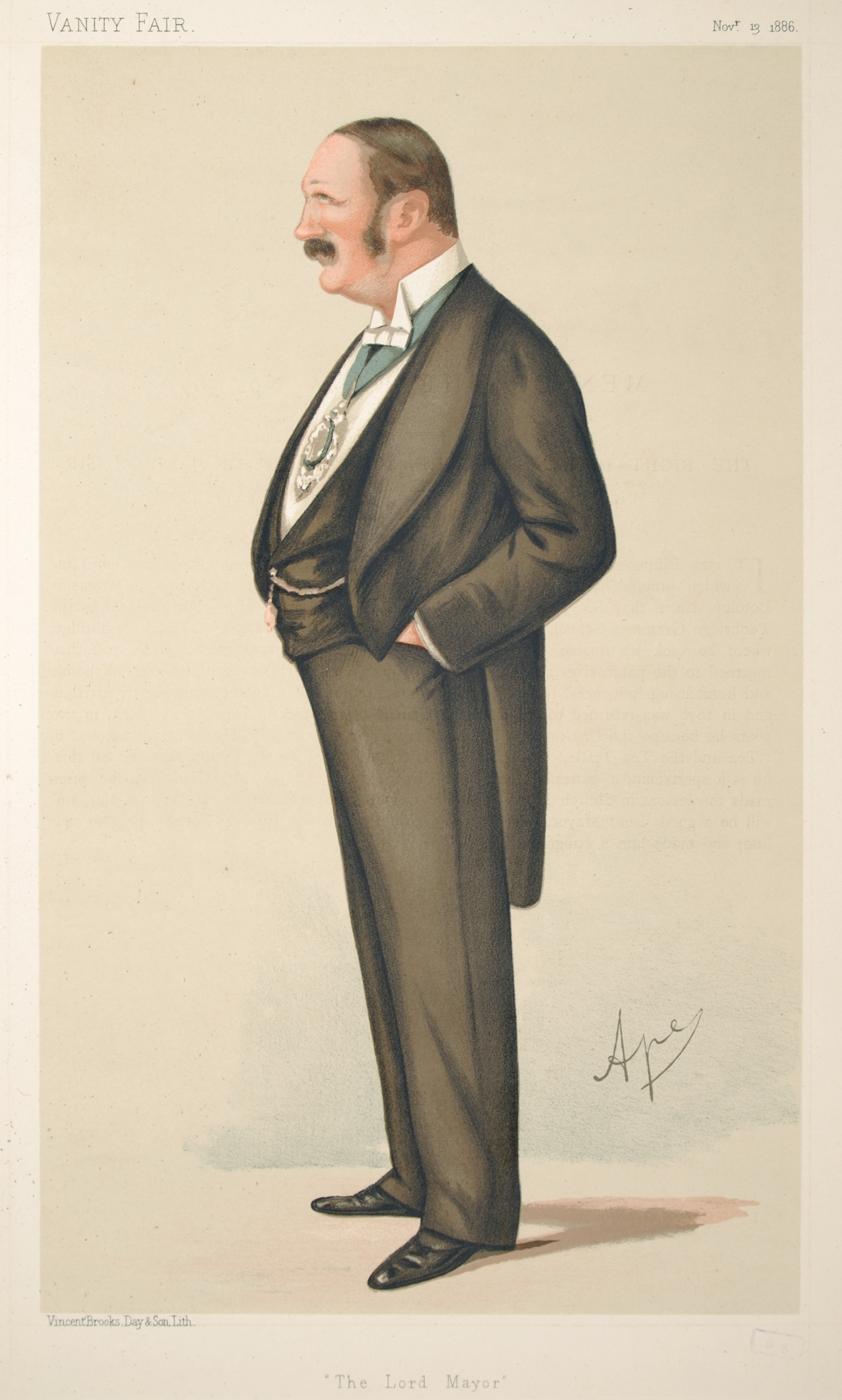
Caricature of Sir Reginald Hanson, 1st Baronet, by Ape, published in Vanity Fair in 1886

The Hanson baronetcy, of Bryanston Square in the County of Middlesex, was created in the Baronetage of the United Kingdom on 6 June 1887 for Reginald Hanson, Lord Mayor of London for 1886/7. He was later Member of Parliament for the City of London from 1891 to 1900.

The title became extinct on the death of the 4th Baronet in 1996.

== Hanson baronets, of Bryanston Square (1887) ==
- Sir Reginald Hanson, 1st Baronet (1840–1905)
- Sir Gerald Stanhope Hanson, 2nd Baronet (1867–1946)
- Sir Richard Leslie Reginald Hanson, 3rd Baronet (1905–1951)
- Sir Anthony Leslie Oswald Hanson, 4th Baronet (1934–1996)

== Extended family ==
Sir Francis Hanson (1868–1910), second son of the 1st Baronet, was a militia officer of the Royal Fusiliers and London alderman, knighted in 1908.

== Notes ==
Baronetage of the United Kingdom
Preceded by Lewis baronets	Hanson baronets of Bryanston Square; 14 June 1887	Succeeded by Carden baronets
