= David Litvinoff =

British film industry consultant

David Litvinoff

David Litvinoff (sometimes Litvinov; born David Levy; 3 February 1928 – 8 April 1975) was a consultant for the British film industry who traded on his knowledge of the criminal elements of the East End of London. A man for whom there are few truly reliable facts, it is unclear how genuine his expertise really was, though he certainly knew the Kray Twins and was particularly friendly with Ronnie Kray, according to a biography published in 2016. He entertained his showbiz friends with stories of the Krays' activities and his niece Vida described him as "the court jester to the rich, smart Chelsea set of the sixties".

== Early life and family ==
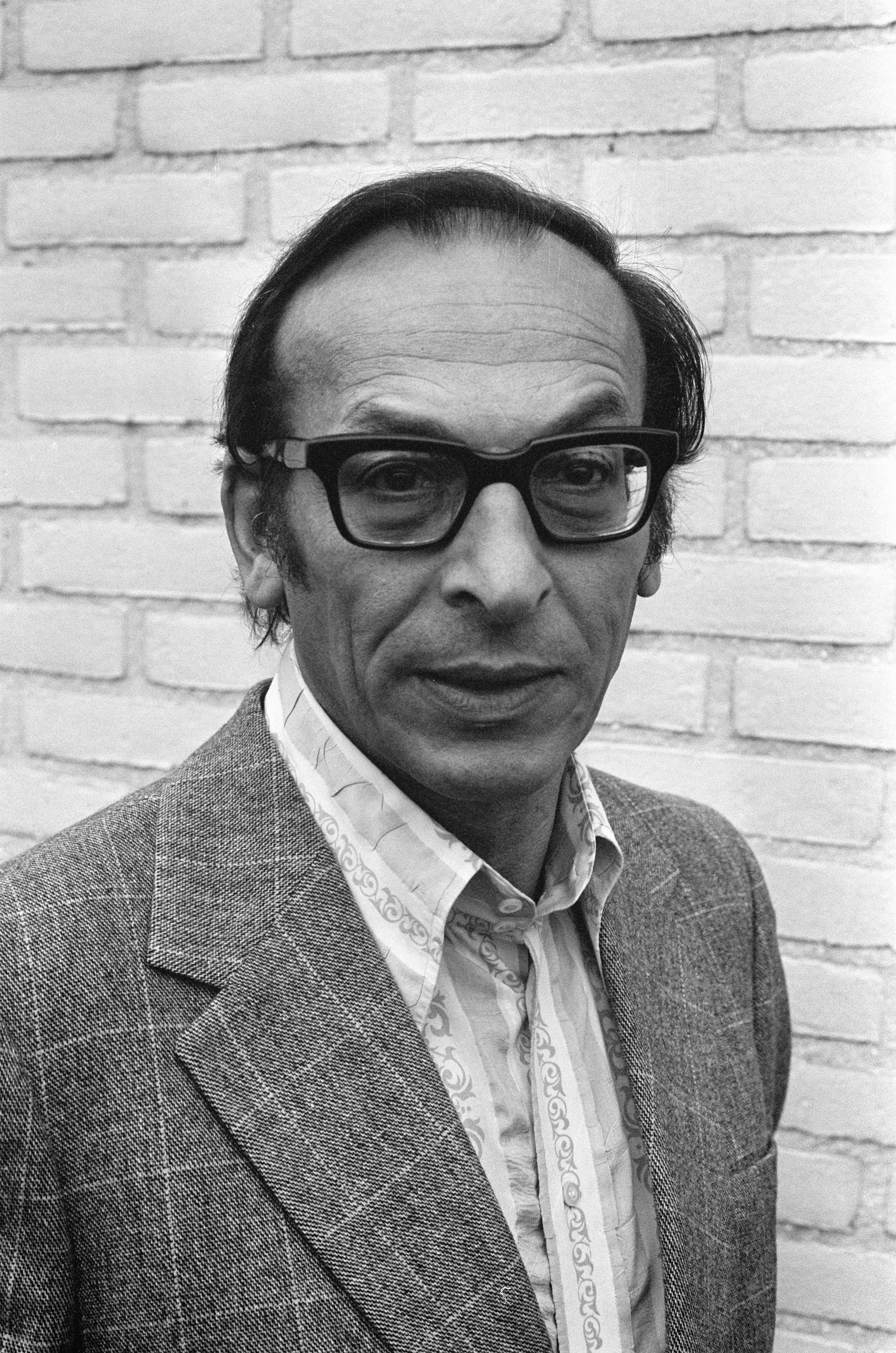
David's half-brother, Emanuel Litvinoff.

Litvinoff was born in 1928 at Hare Marsh, Whitechapel, London, into a Jewish family with Russian origins. His mother and her first husband had fled tsarist pogroms in Odessa in 1913. She had four children with her first husband and five including David Litvinoff with her second husband Solomon Levy whom she married after the first was lost after he joined the Russian army in 1917. He took the surname of his mother's first husband rather than his biological father. His older half-brothers were the writer Emanuel Litvinoff and the historian Barnet Litvinoff. The family were brought up in relative poverty, supported mainly by Mrs Litvinoff's earnings as a dressmaker.

== Jazz and blues ==
Unlike his step-brothers, little is known of David's early adulthood but he seems to have been a well-known figure in the jazz clubs of Soho in the 1950s. He knew George Melly who he first met at Cy Laurie's jazz club in Great Windmill Street and he was also associated with Mick Mulligan. Melly, Mulligan and Litvinoff were all present at what Melly described as a near riot at the Institute of Contemporary Arts in London at what was supposed to be a serious lecture by Melly on "Erotic Imagery in the Blues" but turned into an impromptu stag night for Melly who was getting married the next day. Litvinoff had a lifelong love of Blues music, and left detailed instructions for the disposal of his music recordings on his death, which mainly took the form of reel to reel tapes. When he later had a cottage in Wales, it was described by a local as being wall to wall recordings, including everything that Bing Crosby had ever done up to the latest from Bob Dylan, of whom Litvinoff was a huge fan.

== David Levy or David Litvinoff? ==
Litvinoff invented a complicated persona for himself that disguised his origins and family background. Iain Sinclair said "he had made himself over, so that even the sound of his voice on the telephone gave nothing of his background away". Stories of beatings he had given or taken, people he knew or could put you in contact with all had to be taken with a large pinch of salt. Stories of Litvinoff's activities are legion, but all second hand and often differ according to the teller. According to Sinclair: "Litvinoff was everybody's best friend, he specialized in it. That was his profession. In your company, he was the perfect audience: witty, up to speed with the gossip, seductive". John Pearson remarked on Litvinoff's natural intelligence and described him as "entirely self-taught and self-invented". His friend George Melly, in Owning Up, described him as

The fastest talker I ever met, full of outrageous stories, at least half of which turned out to be true, a dandy of squalor, a face either beautiful or ugly, I could never decide which, but certainly one hundred percent Jewish, a self-propelled catalyst who didn't mind getting hurt as long as he made something happen, a sacred monster, first class.

== Criminal connections ==
Man in a Headscarf (originally The Procurer), Lucian Freud. Oil on canvas, 1954.

Keith Richards wrote of Litvinoff that he "was on the borders of art and villainy, a friend of the Kray brothers, the East End gangsters." The novelist Derek Raymond said, "Used to know Litvinoff's half-brother David quite well. He managed to kill himself. Which was probably just before he would have been murdered."

In Notorious, John Pearson writes that Litvinoff was homosexual and that one function that he performed for Ronnie Kray, who was also homosexual, was to procure boys for sexual services for Ronnie's friends. Such activities also provided useful material for blackmail purposes. Art dealer Christopher Gibbs said "He didn't have an affair with Ronnie Kray, but he used to pick up boys with him sometimes. I remember being flagged down, in Sloane Street, aged 18 or thereabouts [c. 1956], by this car with Litvinoff in it and these frightfully sinister-looking people. One of them was Kray."

Through Ronnie Kray, Litvinoff met Francis Bacon and Lucian Freud who were friends and used to gamble at Esmeralda's Barn, a gambling club in which the Krays had a stake. According to Christopher Gibbs, the man in Freud's painting Man in a Headscarf (originally The Procurer) (1954) was Litvinoff before he was slashed across the face in an attack (sometime before 1968) by an unknown assailant. The Krays were happy to take the credit for the attack as it bolstered their reputation. Pearson claims that Freud gave the work its original name in reference to Litvinoff's function. The painting sold for £1,156,500 at Christie's in 1999. At one time, it had been thought to be a self-portrait.

Mim Scala recalls that around 1960, Litvinoff was the Faginesque head of a small group based at the Temperance Billiard Hall, 131-141 King's Road, Chelsea, that included Eddie Dylan, Brian Masset and Tommy Waldron. According to Scala, "what Litvinoff liked best were little boys, particularly naughty, runaway Borstal boys." Scala described him as "physically quite ugly: thin lips, a huge nose and a prematurely bald head" but with the ability to "talk the birds out of the trees, money out of pockets, boys into bed, and gangsters out of killing him".

After Litvinoff ran up a debt at Esmeralda's Barn, he did a deal with Ronnie Kray whereby he let Ronnie have the end of the lease on Litvinoff's flat in Ashburn Gardens, near the Gloucester Road in Kensington, as well as the use of Litvinoff's young male lover who also got a job at the Barn. Litvinoff continued to live in the flat and the arrangement suited everyone very well.

== The Pheasantry ==
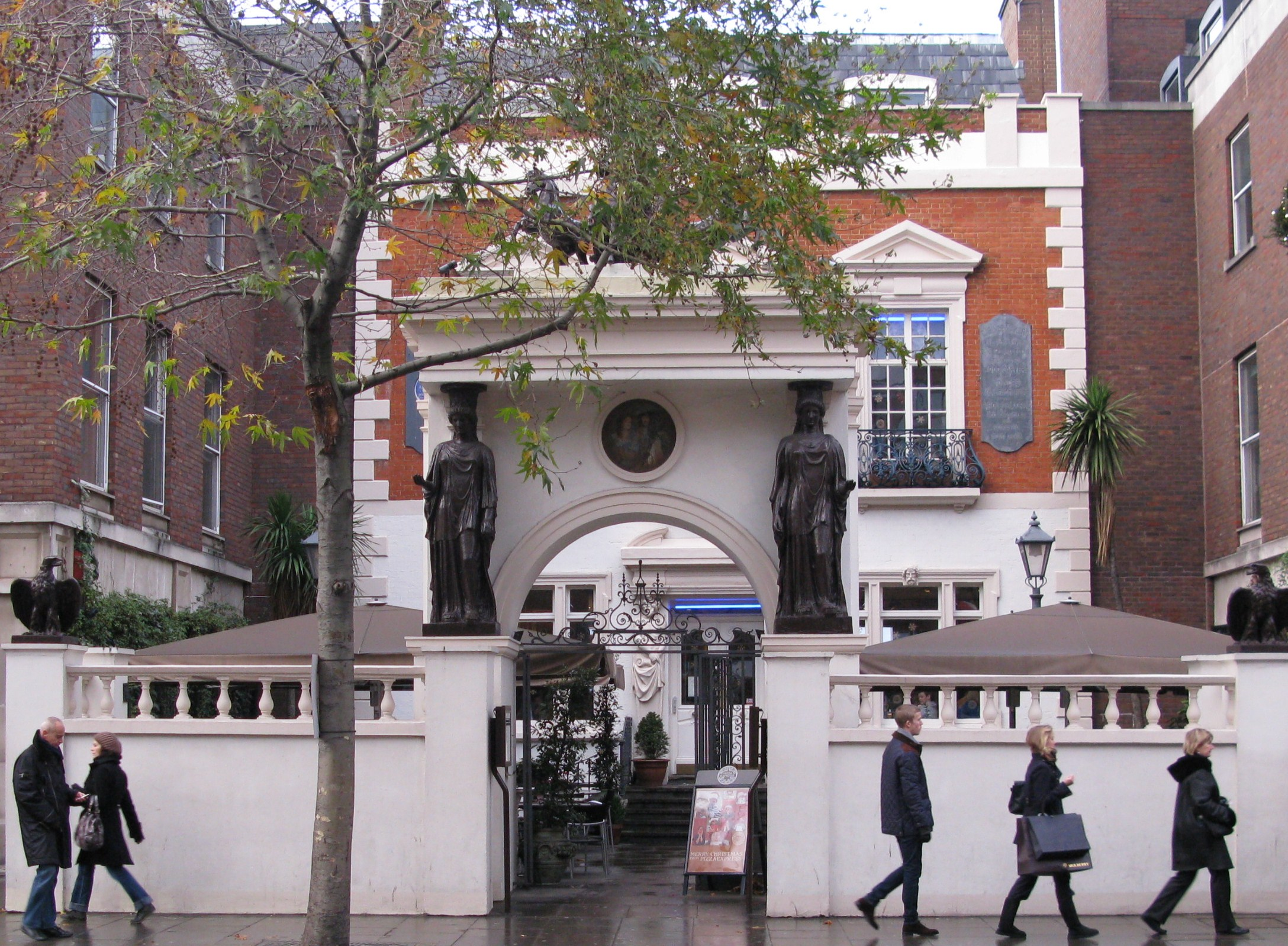
The Pheasantry in 2009

In 1967, Litvinoff was living at The Pheasantry, 152 King's Road, then dilapidated flats with a club in the basement that was in the process of turning into a form of artistic commune. Litvinoff worked in Tim Whidborne's studio. Eric Clapton and Martin Sharp of Oz magazine shared a studio there and other residents included Germaine Greer, Robert Whitaker and Nicky Kramer.

== After the Redlands raid ==
In February 1967 the British police raided Keith Richards' home at Redlands in West Wittering after having received a tip-off that illegal drugs were being used at a party there. Litvinoff is not thought to have been at the party but according to multiple sources, took it upon himself to find out who the police informer was. Nicky Kramer, a member of the trendy Chelsea set, immediately came under suspicion and Litvinoff and hard-man John Bindon interrogated him fairly roughly before deciding that he was not the man they were looking for. Supposedly, they held him out of a window by his ankles.

== Work in the film industry ==
In May 1968 the Kray twins were arrested on charges which included conspiracy to murder. In the autumn of 1968 shooting started on the film Performance, (released 1970) written by Donald Cammell and co-directed by Cammell and Nicolas Roeg, and starring James Fox and Mick Jagger. Litvinoff got the job of "dialogue coach and technical adviser". He had been a friend of Cammell since childhood, and through knowledge gained from his friendship with the Kray twins, he was able to introduced the cast and crew to London's underworld. Marianne Faithfull said: "They hired real gangsters ... and a genuine mob boss as adviser. This was David Litvinoff. Part of Litz's job was to be James Fox's tutor in infamy."

John Clark, art director on the film, said: "I did a lot of work with Litvinoff. He was very good on details. All the things for Chas (James Fox)'s apartment: the colours, ashtrays, phones. Litvinoff was a shadowy character. He had this massive razor slash across his face." According to Chris Sullivan in The Times, it was Litvinoff who recruited real life criminal John Bindon to act in the film. Writing about Performance in The Independent, David Thomson calls him "the most brilliant nutter anyone had ever met ... the catalyst – he just brought the whole thing together".

== Wales ==
Sometime in 1968, Litvinoff rented Cefn Bedd cottage in Llanddewi Brefi. A stream of notable 60s figures seem to have stayed at the cottage including Eric Clapton, the artist Martin Sharp who designed the album covers for Cream, and Nigel Waymouth who was one of the owners of boutique Granny Takes a Trip. There was speculation that a bearded man with long hair and an American accent named Gerry was actually Bob Dylan, but Christopher Gibbs has said that this was really Litvinoff's "sidekick", Gerry Goldstein. Local legend also has it that the Rolling Stones, Jimi Hendrix and even Yoko Ono visited and that Litvinoff distributed signed Stones LPs. One local saw an invitation to Hendrix's funeral on the cottage mantlepiece.

Litvinoff left Llanddewi Brefi around the end of 1969 after being tipped-off about possible police interest in the cottage, returning to London and then going to Australia. On his return he stayed with Christopher Gibbs. In 1977, Operation Julie busted a large LSD manufacturing and distribution network operating partly from Llanddewi Brefi. Although this network is believed to have only been operating from 1969, and there is no evidence of any involvement by Litvinoff, media reports have linked it with his time in Llanddewi Brefi and the music industry figures that he brought to the village.

== Death and legacy ==
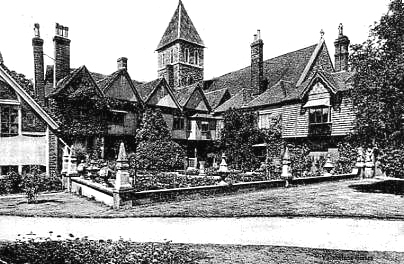
Davington Priory, c. 1910.

From 1972 until his death in April 1975 from an overdose of sleeping pills, Litvinoff lived at Davington Priory, Faversham, Kent, (current home of Bob Geldof) which was then owned by the art dealer Christopher Gibbs.

Litvinoff left no published writings under his own name. Gerry Goldstein said that Litvinoff had once supplied material for the "William Hickey" column in the Daily Express newspaper, and his friend the film producer Sandy Lieberson later asked him to write a biography of the comedian Lenny Bruce but that was never completed. There were once rumours in the London book trade, which have never been confirmed, of Litvinoff diaries. Litvinoff was in the habit of recording his phone calls for amusement and the sound of the different voices and he was fascinated by the earliest phone-in radio shows. One witness recalls Litvinoff speaking on the telephone to a confused Brian Jones of The Rolling Stones the night before Jones died. According to Iain Sinclair, Gerry Goldstein, Nigel Waymouth and others together had a large collection of Litvinoff tapes.

Iain Sinclair wrote in 1999 that it was hard to find anyone who remembered Litvinoff as the cost of joining that club was "burn-out, premature senility or suicide."
