= George Gibbs, 1st Baron Wraxall =

British politician

The Right Honourable The Lord Wraxall PC DL
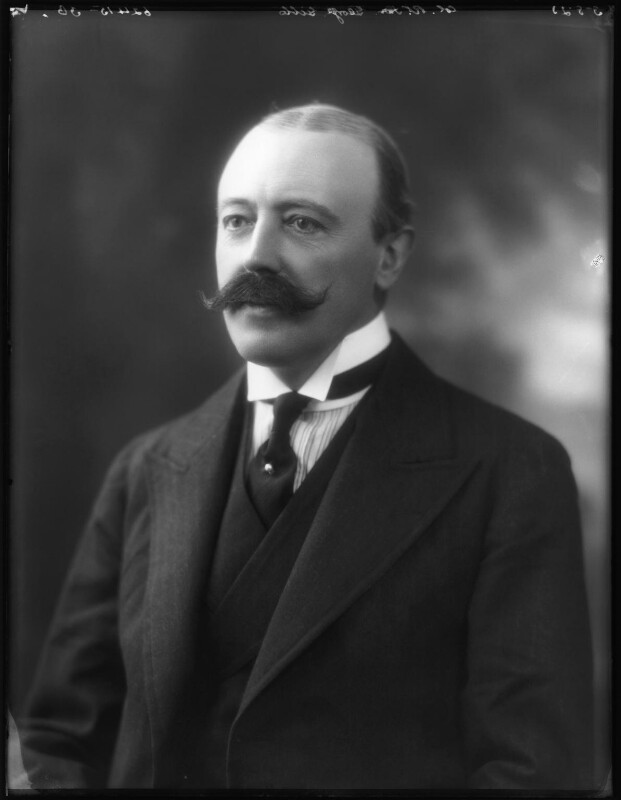

Treasurer of the Household
- In office 1921–1924
- Preceded by: Bolton Eyres-Monsell
- Succeeded by: Thomas Griffiths
- In office 1924–1928
- Preceded by: Thomas Griffiths
- Succeeded by: George Hennessy

Personal details
- Born: 6 July 1873
- Died: 28 October 1931 (aged 58)
- Education: Christ Church, Oxford

George Abraham Gibbs, 1st Baron Wraxall, PC, DL (6 July 1873 – 28 October 1931) was a British Conservative politician.

== Early life ==
Educated at Eton College and Christ Church, Oxford, Gibbs was the eldest of the seven sons of Major Antony Gibbs and Janet Louisa Merivale, daughter of John Louis Merivale. His grandfather, William Gibbs, was the younger brother of George Henry Gibbs, the father of Hucks Gibbs, 1st Baron Aldenham, while his great-grandfather, Antony Gibbs, was the founder of the firm Antony Gibbs & Sons, bankers and merchants. His own brother, Evelyn (1879–1932), married in 1919 Lady Helena Cambridge, formerly Princess Helena of Teck, a niece of Queen Mary and descendant of King George III.

== Military career ==
Gibbs was appointed a captain in the Yeomanry regiment the North Somerset Yeomanry on 25 September 1895. Following the outbreak of the Second Boer War in late 1899 he volunteered for active service, and on 28 February 1900 was appointed a lieutenant in the Imperial Yeomanry, where he served in the 48th (North Somerset) Company in the 7th Battalion. He was later colonel of the North Somerset Yeomanry, and was appointed deputy lieutenant of Somerset in 1911.

== Political career ==
In 1906, Gibbs was elected Member of Parliament for Bristol West (succeeding Sir Michael Hicks-Beach), a seat he would hold until 1928. He served as Parliamentary Private Secretary to the Colonial Secretary Walter Long, 1st Viscount Long (his father-in-law), and as a government whip from 1917 to 1921 in the coalition ministry of David Lloyd George. In 1921, he was appointed Treasurer of the Household, a post he continued to hold also under Bonar Law and Baldwin until 1924 and again from 1924 to 1928. Gibbs was sworn of the Privy Council in the 1923 Birthday Honours, and in 1928 he was raised to the peerage as Baron Wraxall, of Clyst St George, in the County of Devon.

== Family ==
Lord Wraxall married firstly Victoria Florence de Burgh Long, daughter of Walter Long, 1st Viscount Long. They had three children, one daughter and two sons. Both of the sons died as infants. After his first wife's death in 1920, Lord Wraxall married secondly, Hon. Ursula Mary Lawley, daughter of Sir Arthur Lawley (later the 6th Baron Wenlock). They had two sons, successively the 2nd and 3rd Barons Wraxall.

Lord Wraxall died from pneumonia in October 1931, aged 58. He was succeeded in the barony by his eldest son from his second marriage, Richard Gibbs, 2nd Baron Wraxall.

== See also ==
- Tyntesfield
- Baron Aldenham
- Baron Hunsdon of Hunsdon

Parliament of the United Kingdom
Preceded by Sir Michael Hicks Beach	Member of Parliament for Bristol West; 1906–1928	Succeeded by Cyril Culverwell
Political offices
Preceded by Bolton Eyres-Monsell	Treasurer of the Household; 1921–1924	Succeeded by Thomas Griffiths
Preceded by Thomas Griffiths	Treasurer of the Household; 1924–1928	Succeeded by George Hennessy
Peerage of the United Kingdom
New creation	Baron Wraxall; 1928–1931	Succeeded by Richard Gibbs
