= The Pheasantry =

Building in Chelsea, London, England

Coordinates: 51.4890°N 0.1642°W

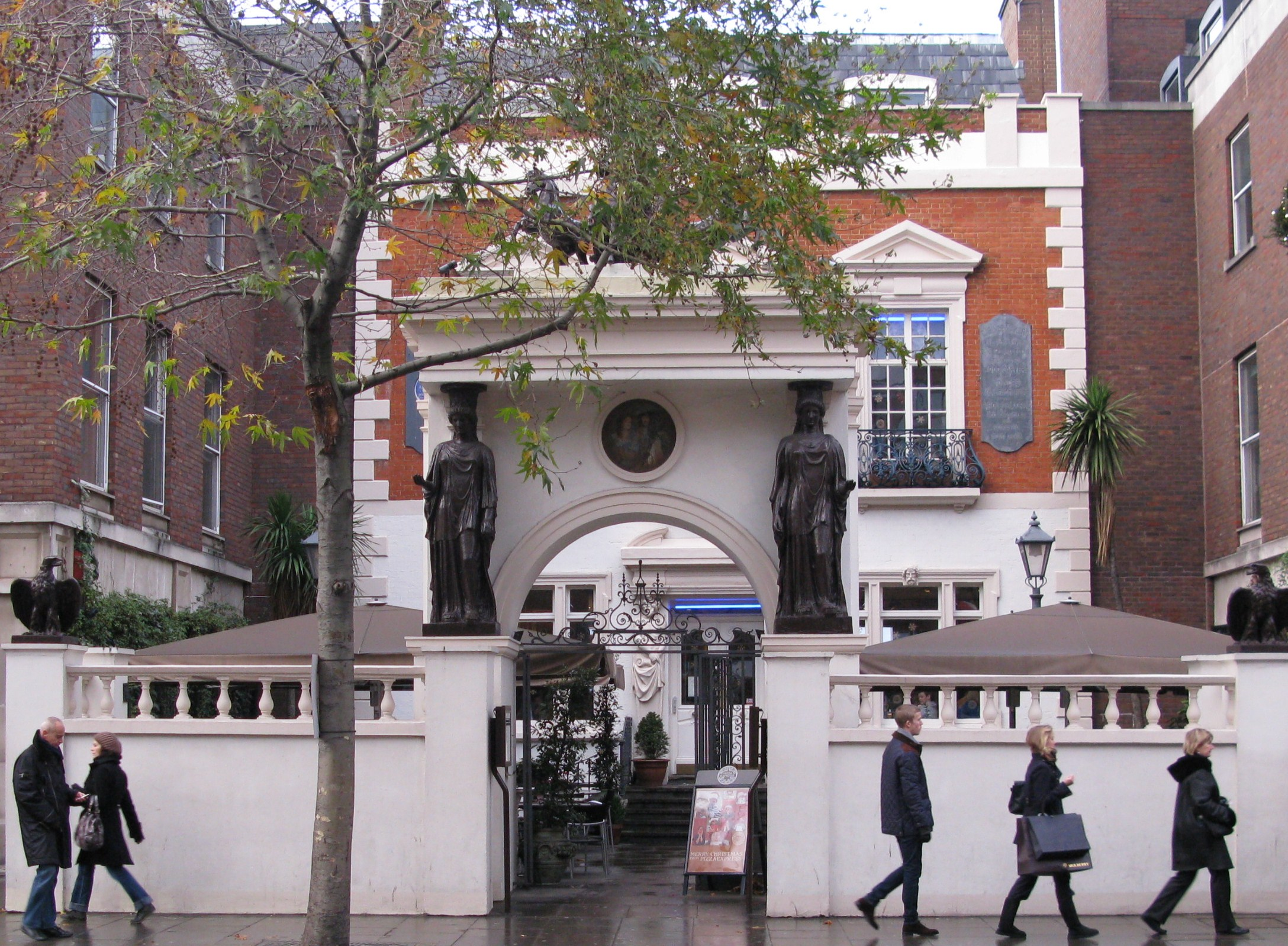
The Pheasantry in 2009

The Pheasantry, 152 King's Road, Chelsea, London, is a Grade II listed building. It was home to a number of important figures in 1960s London, and operated as a small music venue in the 1970s, where a number of bands were able to play their first gigs. Today, it is the home of a PizzaExpress restaurant, and also accommodates a music and cabaret venue called PizzaExpress Live Chelsea.

== Early history ==
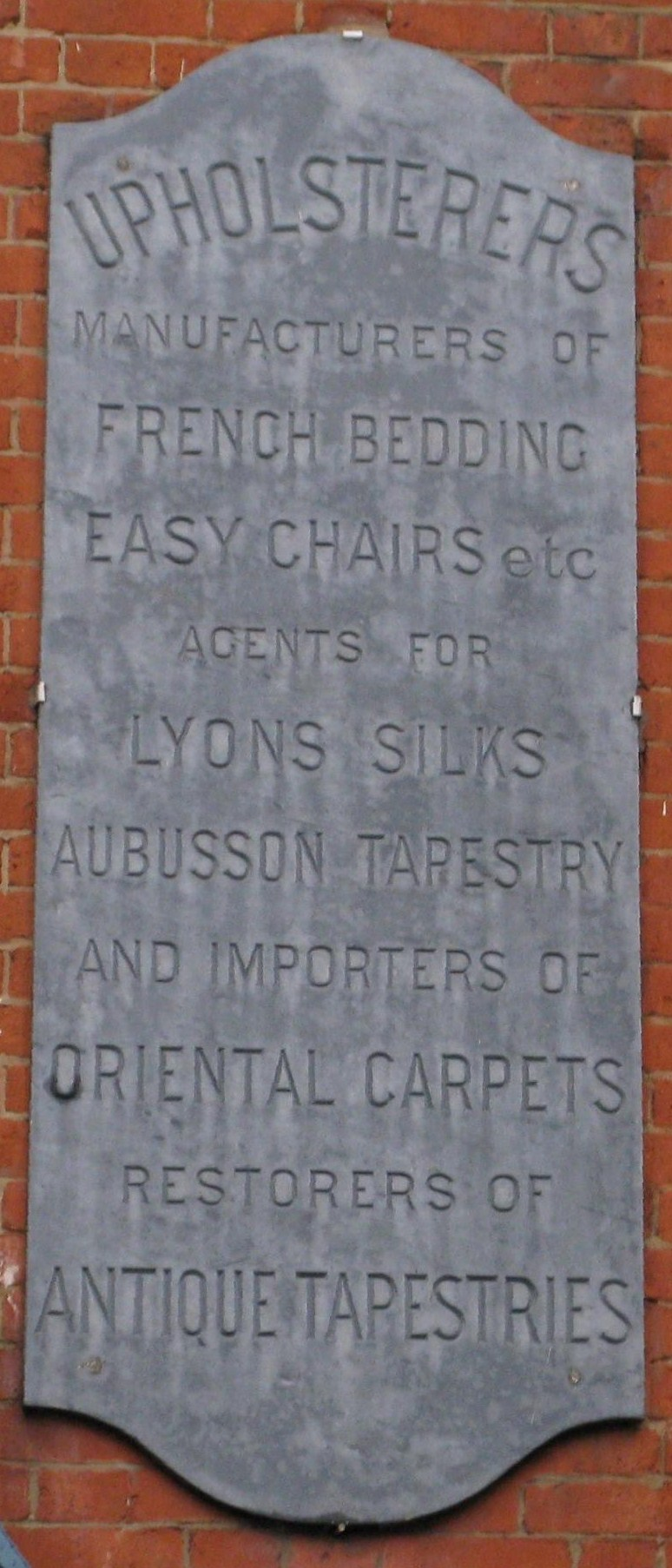
Trade signs from Amédée Joubert & Son survive at The Pheasantry

The original buildings, now largely demolished, may have been constructed in 1766 or 1769. The site gets its name from the business of Samuel Baker who developed new breeds of oriental pheasants as well as cattle and foxes. Advertising appeared in The Field in 1865 offering pairs of birds for 15 guineas.

== Amédée Joubert and Son ==
The current building was constructed in the mid-nineteenth century. The Jouberts bought the building in 1880 and it seems that they added significant amounts of architectural decoration around that time. According to Nikolaus Pevsner and Bridget Cherry, the building includes a "flamboyant Louis XV façade and a triumphal entrance arch to its front courtyard with caryatids and quadringa ... the odd, extremely heavy display of Grecian enthusiasm were added to an earlier house in 1881 by the artist and interior decorator Amédée Joubert". The London Green Guide noted in 2012 that only the facade and portico survive.

The firm of Amédée Joubert & Son provided services of upholstery, gilding, the importation of Aubusson tapestry, Lyons silks and oriental carpets and the manufacture of French bedding, chairs etc. and continued until 1932, lastly under Felix Joubert who also made dolls' house furniture for Queen Mary. By 1914, however, the showroom was closed and the rest of the building rented out as studios with only the basement in use by the Jouberts as a workshop.

== Pheasantry studios ==
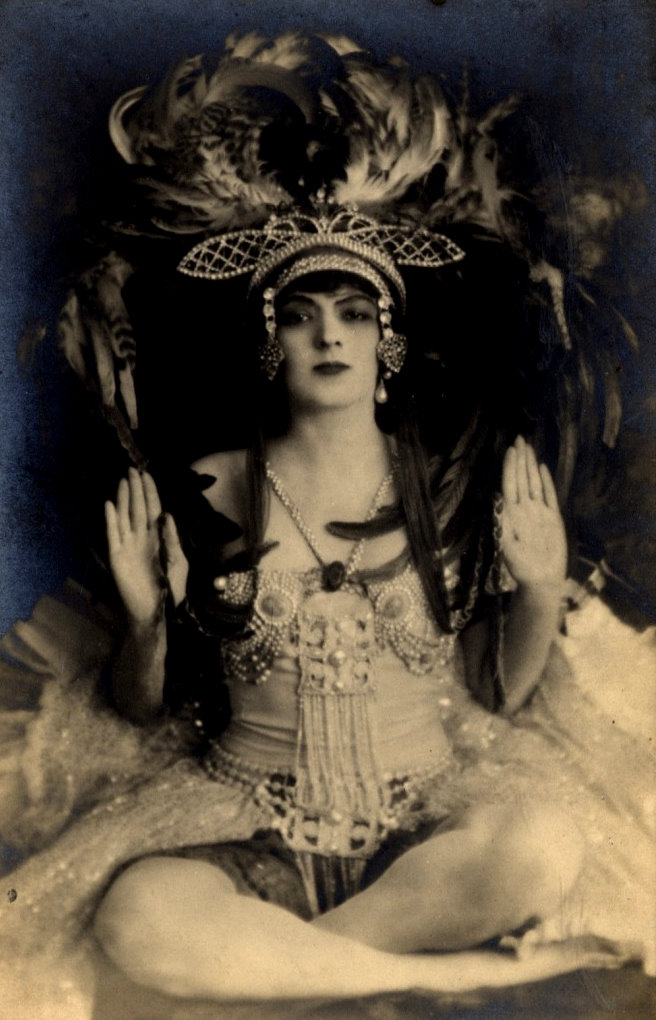
Serafina Astafieva, c. 1890s

In the early 1900s, one occupant of the Pheasantry was Eleanor Thornton (drowned 1915), a favourite model of artist and sculptor Charles Sykes. Thornton may have been the model for Sykes' most famous work, his Rolls-Royce mascot the Spirit of Ecstasy.

From 1916, part of the building was a ballet academy run by the dance teacher Serafina Astafieva (1876–1934), great niece of Leo Tolstoy. Astafieva trained Alicia Markova who came to Diaghilev's attention when he visited the school in 1921 and went on to join his Ballets Russes. Anton Dolin and Margot Fonteyn also trained there.

From 1950, the Italian painter Pietro Annigoni spent six months a year in Britain using the Pheasantry as his British studio.

== The Pheasantry Club ==
Following the retirement of Felix Joubert in 1932, the basement became a bohemian restaurant and drinking club patronised by actors and artists, including Augustus John, Dylan Thomas, Humphrey Bogart, and Francis Bacon. It was run by an Italian called Reny De Meo. Lynda Bellingham recalls that in the 1960s Anthony Hopkins would "hold court" there doing an impression of Richard Burton doing Dylan Thomas. The club closed in 1966 after the death of the owner Mario Cazzani, and the building was converted into apartments and the basement into a nightclub.

== 1960s ==
Among those living at The Pheasantry in the 1960s were David Litvinoff who worked in Tim Whidborne's studio there, the writer Anthony Haden-Guest, the musician Eric Clapton and Martin Sharp of Oz magazine who shared a studio there, Germaine Greer, Robert Whitaker, Philippe Mora, Freya Mathews and Nicky Kramer. Clapton only escaped being arrested on drugs charges by Norman Pilcher, who rang the doorbell to announce "postman, special delivery", by escaping from the rear of the building. By this time, the building was starting to deteriorate. One visitor, Mick Farren, recalled: "It was falling down. It had gone through its popular phase, but no money had been put back into it to fix the roof and stuff, and the roofs were leaking and everything was kind of coming apart".

The sound from the nightclub in the basement could be heard through the floorboards in the studios above. The club had seen better days. Barry Miles recalls it as a venue where "the likelihood of having your drink spiked with acid was pretty high". Another said: "It would be an R & B club for a bit ... then it'd become a gay club for a while ... [it] always seemed to be hosting various floating crap games, some of which were R & B, some of which were folk music and some of which were gay. I think also it had a back room where the doors were closed and people went on drinking, and I think there were gangsters involved."

According to Miles, one King's Road character who lived at the Pheasantry had a pet rabbit, which he dyed bright green and may have given acid to, that "committed suicide" by leaping from the roof. Miles said: "He was a fucking mad idiot. I mean, there were a lot of people like that, particularly at the Pheasantry, it was really filled with them."

The building was listed as a Grade II historic building on 29 August 1969.

== 1970s ==
The Pheasantry nightclub hosted early gigs by Lou Reed, Queen, and Hawkwind. The venue was small, but it was a gig in London, and unsigned bands were grateful for that. The 1972 gig by Queen, which had been intended as a showcase for the band, did not go well. Phil Reed remembered that the band were "unpolished" and the venue was mainly a disco, "once the disco had stopped and Queen went on everyone went to the bar." In addition, none of the record company A & R people who had been invited, turned up. Thin Lizzy performed there, with their audience described as "a handful of posey people sitting there drinking cocktails".

Andrew Lloyd Webber and Tim Rice found Yvonne Elliman at the Pheasantry, as a result of which she featured in the original soundtrack of Jesus Christ Superstar. Sparks played their first British gig there.

In the 1970s John Betjeman led a campaign to prevent the redevelopment of the site.

== Today ==
The building now houses a branch of the PizzaExpress restaurant chain.

In the basement is a cabaret club and music venue which opened in 2010 after the closure of Pizza on the Park, officially named PizzaExpress Live Chelsea.
