= Christopher Gibbs =

British antiques dealer and collector (1938–2018)

- Born: Christopher Henry Gibbs; 29 July 1938; United Kingdom
- Died: 28 July 2018 (aged 79); Tangier, Morocco
- Education: Eton College (expelled); Stanbridge Earls School; University of Poitiers
- Occupations: Antiques dealer and collector
- Known for: The "King of Chelsea"
- Partner: Peter Hinwood
- Relatives: Herbert Gibbs, 1st Baron Hunsdon of Hunsdon (grandfather); Sir Roger Gibbs (brother)

Christopher Henry Gibbs (29 July 1938 – 28 July 2018) was a British antiques dealer and collector who was also an influential figure in men's fashion and interior design in 1960s London. He has been credited with inventing Swinging London, and has been called the "King of Chelsea" and "London's most famous antiques dealer". The New York Times described him as a "man of infinite taste, judgment and experience, the one who introduced a whole generation to the distressed bohemian style of interior design."

== Early life and education ==
Gibbs was the fifth son of Hon. Sir Geoffrey Cokayne Gibbs KCMG and his wife Helen Margaret Leslie CBE, and the grandson of Herbert Gibbs, 1st Baron Hunsdon of Hunsdon. His elder brother was the financier Sir Roger Gibbs. He was educated at Eton College, from which he was expelled "for being generally totally impossible", Stanbridge Earls School in Hampshire and the University of Poitiers.

== Swinging London ==
A style leader in 1960s London, Gibbs is credited with fellow Old Etonian Robert Fraser with inventing "Swinging London". He has been said to be the first man to wear flared trousers in 1961, and was ordering flower print shirts by 1964. He was an editor of the shopping guide in the quarterly Men in Vogue, the first male edition of the magazine produced between 1965 and 1970, which was closely associated with the peacock revolution in English men's fashion in the 1960s. His style has been described as a kind of "louche dandyism", while others have described him as a latter-day Beau Brummell.

At the same time, Gibbs was running his own antiques business, which he had started in 1958, making regular trips to Morocco to acquire stock. He brought back Moroccan brass lamps, carpets, soft furnishings and other things that came to characterise the "hippie look".

== The Rolling Stones ==
Gibbs was a friend of the Rolling Stones and his upper-class background was of interest to Mick Jagger, whose origins were more modest. It was at one of Gibbs' Cheyne Walk, Chelsea, dinner parties that Jagger whispered to the fashion designer Michael Fish, "I'm here to learn how to be a gentleman". In 1967, Gibbs was at Keith Richards's country house, Redlands, in West Wittering, when Richards, Jagger and Marianne Faithfull were all arrested (and Jagger subsequently imprisoned) for possession of illegal drugs. And in 1968, Gibbs introduced Prince Rupert Loewenstein, then working in London as a merchant banker, to Jagger. Loewenstein went on to become the Stones' business manager until 2007.

Gibbs was the set designer on the 1970 film Performance, directed by Donald Cammell and Nicolas Roeg and starring James Fox and Mick Jagger. He was godfather to one of Jagger's children.

== Davington Priory ==
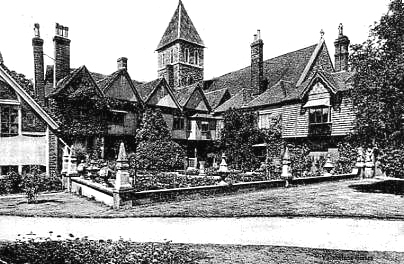
Davington Priory, around 1910.

In 1972, Gibbs bought Davington Priory, a former Benedictine nunnery in Davington, Kent, built in 1153. It was there that David Litvinoff lived from 1972 until 1975 when he committed suicide through an overdose of pills. Gibbs sold Davington Priory in 1982. It is now owned by Bob Geldof.

== A "long lost masterpiece" ==
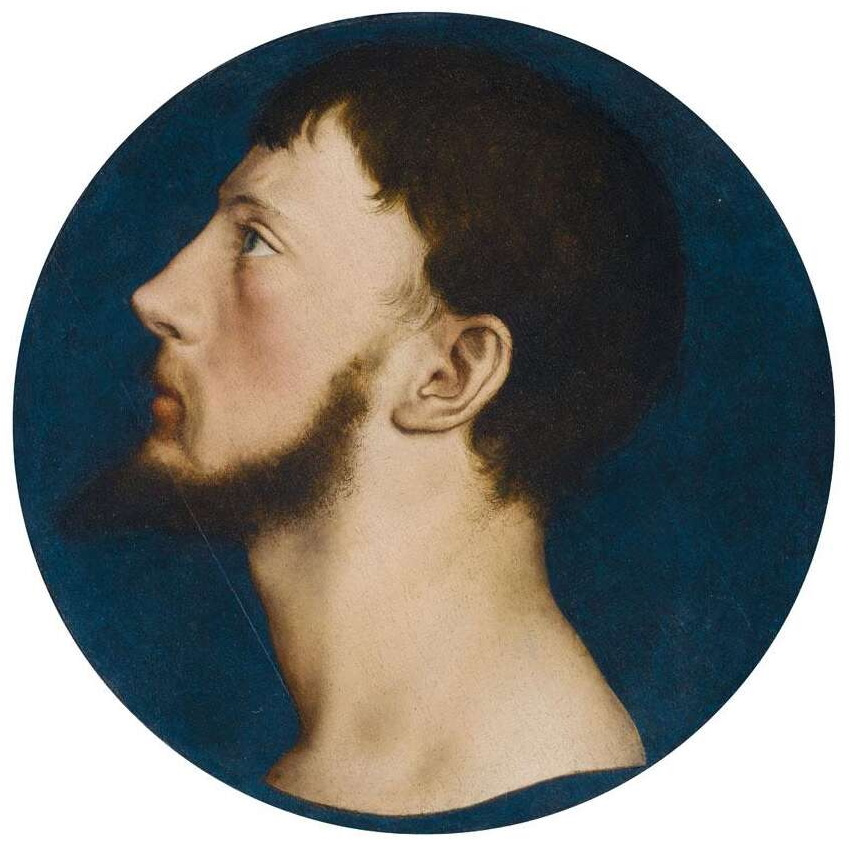
Sir Thomas Wyatt the Younger (1521–1554) by Hans Holbein, c. 1541

In 2006, a painting Gibbs had bought in 1974 for £2,800 was put up for sale by Sotheby's with an estimate of £2–3 million. It had taken experts, led by Gibbs's friend Sir Roy Strong, 30 years to complete the authentication of the work as "a long lost masterpiece" by Hans Holbein of Thomas Wyatt the Younger. The painting failed to sell after it was leaked that Tate Britain doubted its authenticity. In 2007 it appeared for sale at $10 million on a dealer's stand at the Maastricht Art Fair after the attribution to Holbein was accepted by the TEFAF vetting committee.

== Charity work ==
Gibbs played a key role in persuading his friend John Paul Getty Jr. to donate £40 million to the British National Gallery. After Getty's death in 2003, Gibbs became chairman of the J. Paul Getty Jr. Charitable Trust, set up to manage Getty's estate. He was also a trustee of the American Friends of the National Gallery.

== Later life ==
In 2000, Gibbs reluctantly sold Clifton Hampden Manor in Clifton Hampden, Oxfordshire, a house that had been built for his family in the 1840s. Christie's auctioned off the contents over two days. The sale showed his eclectic tastes: lots included a dining table supposedly made from one of the first pieces of mahogany brought to England from the New World in the 17th century, and a portrait of Cornish eccentric John Nichols Thom. In 2006, he moved to Tangier, where he had bought a large property on the Old Mountain that had previously been owned by James and Marguerite McBey. According to a friend, "He has a house on 14 acres in Tangier next door to the king" and "Christopher has built four other houses there but says he doesn't rent them out as he likes to live in them all, moving from one to the other as the mood takes him."

Gibbs died at his home in Tangier, Morocco, on 28 July 2018, one day before his 80th birthday.

He was buried on 1 August at the cemetery of the Church of Saint Andrew, Tangier.

== Personal life ==
When not in Morocco, Gibbs was a longtime resident of the Albany in London. His "life and business partner" was Peter Hinwood, the actor turned antique dealer and designer. Gibbs died in Tangier, Morocco on the day before his 80th birthday. A monograph and biography, Christopher Gibbs, His World, by Sarah Hyde was published in 2025.
