= Gerald Hanson =

British soldier and landowner

Sir Gerald Stanhope Hanson, 2nd Baronet (23 April 1867 – 18 January 1946) was a British soldier and landowner.

Hanson was the son of former Lord Mayor of London, Sir Reginald Hanson. Educated at Magdalene College, Cambridge, he was a British Army captain before choosing life as a country gentleman. He succeeded to the baronetcy on 18 April 1905, on the death of his father.

Sir Gerald had a brother, Sir Francis Stanhope Hanson, who was a well known London merchant, and was created a Knight Bachelor in his own right in 1908. There were also two sisters.

Sir Gerald died on 18 January 1946, aged 78, and was succeeded by his son, Sir Richard Leslie Reginald Hanson, 3rd Baronet. Sir Richard Hanson, like his uncle Sir Francis Hanson, was a member of the Lodge of Assistance No 2773 of English Freemasonry.

Baronetage of the United Kingdom
Preceded by Reginald Hanson	Baronet (of Bryanston Square); 1905–1946	Succeeded by Richard Hanson
