= Carden baronets of Wimpole Street and Molesey (1887) =

The Carden baronetcy, of Wimpole Street in the County of Middlesex and of Molesey in the County of Surrey, was created in the Baronetage of the United Kingdom on 14 June 1887 for Robert Carden. He was Lord Mayor of London from 1857 to 1858 and also represented Gloucester from 1857 to 1859 and Barnstaple from 1880 to 1885 in the House of Commons.

He was succeeded by his eldest son the 2nd Baronet, a Lieutenant-Colonel in the 5th Lancers who served as High Sheriff of Hampshire in 1891. The 3rd Baronet was a Major in the 1st Life Guards and also served as High Sheriff of Hampshire, in 1922; and as a Deputy Lieutenant of Berkshire in 1936. His son the 4th Baronet was a Lieutenant-Colonel in the 17th/21st Lancers.

The 5th Baronet was a forestry consultant who lived in Bolivia. The baronetcy became extinct upon his death in 2025.

== Carden baronets, of Wimpole Street and Molesey (1887) ==
- Sir Robert Walter Carden, 1st Baronet (1801–1888)
- Sir Frederick Walter Carden, 2nd Baronet (1833–1909)
- Sir Frederick Henry Walter Carden, 3rd Baronet (1873–1966)
- Sir Henry Christopher Carden, 4th Baronet (1908–1993)
- Sir Christopher Robert Carden, 5th Baronet (1946–2025)

Following the death of the 5th Baronet, the baronetcy is extinct.

Baronetage of the United Kingdom
Preceded by Hanson baronets	Carden baronets of Wimpole Street and Molesey; 14 June 1887	Succeeded by Borthwick baronets
