= Davington Priory =

Priory in Faversham, Kent, England

Coordinates: 51°19′10″N 0°53′4″E

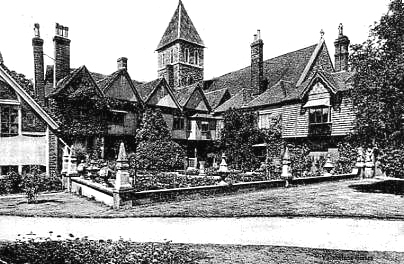
Davington Priory, around 1910. The tower and roof of the parish church are in the background.

Davington Priory was a priory on the north Kent coast of England. It sits on Davington Hill, now a northern suburb of Faversham but then an isolated rural location.

== History ==
A Benedictine nunnery was built at Davington in 1153. It managed to avoid the violence of the dissolution of the monasteries by a natural decline in the early 16th century – the last nun died in 1535. The priory passed to the Crown, who sold it to Sir Thomas Cheney (Cheyney). Cheney was a favourite of Henry VIII's second wife, Anne Boleyn, and was appointed Lord Warden of the Cinque Ports in 1536.

The nave of the Norman church continues to this day as the parish church, which is dedicated to St Mary Magdalene and St Lawrence – unusually it was privately owned until the Church of England bought it in 1931. The choir of the church was demolished by 1580 to provide building stone, and one of the twin towers had gone by 1692.

== Modern history ==
Part of the cloister and nuns' domestic quarters were converted into a house, which was bought by the Church of England in 1931 and sold as a private residence to the antiques dealer and collector Christopher Gibbs in 1972, and he in turn sold it in 1982. It was at Davington Priory that David Litvinoff lived from 1972 until 1975, when he ended his life through an overdose of pills.

The Priory is now owned by Bob Geldof, who bought it from his friend Gibbs. By 2023, Geldof had lived there for 40 years. According to one local, retired publican Terence Boulton, "He's [Geldof] very approachable and doesn't act like a superstar. He talks to people and is often seen walking around the town".
