= Via Gibbs =

Portrait of Via Gibbs at Tyntesfield House

Victoria 'Via' Florence de Burgh Gibbs CBE (1881-1920) was a British noblewoman who was made Commander of the British Empire for her welfare work during World War I.

She was born Victoria Florence de Burgh Long to MP Walter Hume Long. In 1901 she married George Gibbs. She suffered nine miscarriages and the deaths of two infant sons, and had one surviving daughter, Doreen Albinia de Burgh Gibbs.

Via served as Vice-President of the Long Ashton Division of the British Red Cross and Order of St John. She opened her home, Tyntesfield, as a convalescent home for wounded soldiers, and sat on several other committees including the North Somerset's Unionist Association, which set up camps for refugees. She was appointed CBE in 1919 in recognition of her work.

She died in 1920 at the age of 39. Her memoir, Via Gibbs, was published in 1921.
