= Reginald Hanson =

British politician (1840–1905)

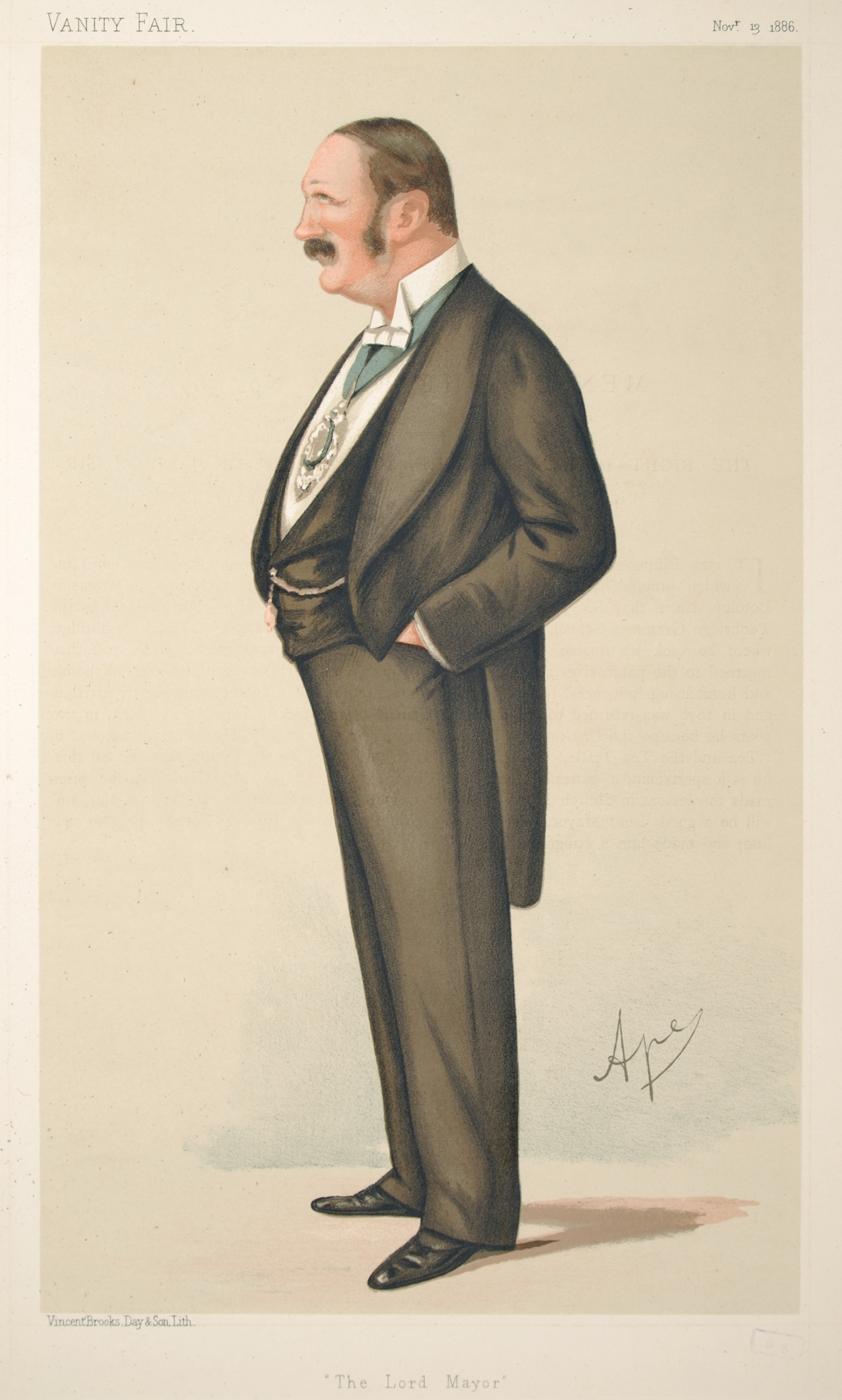
Caricature by Ape published in Vanity Fair in 1886.

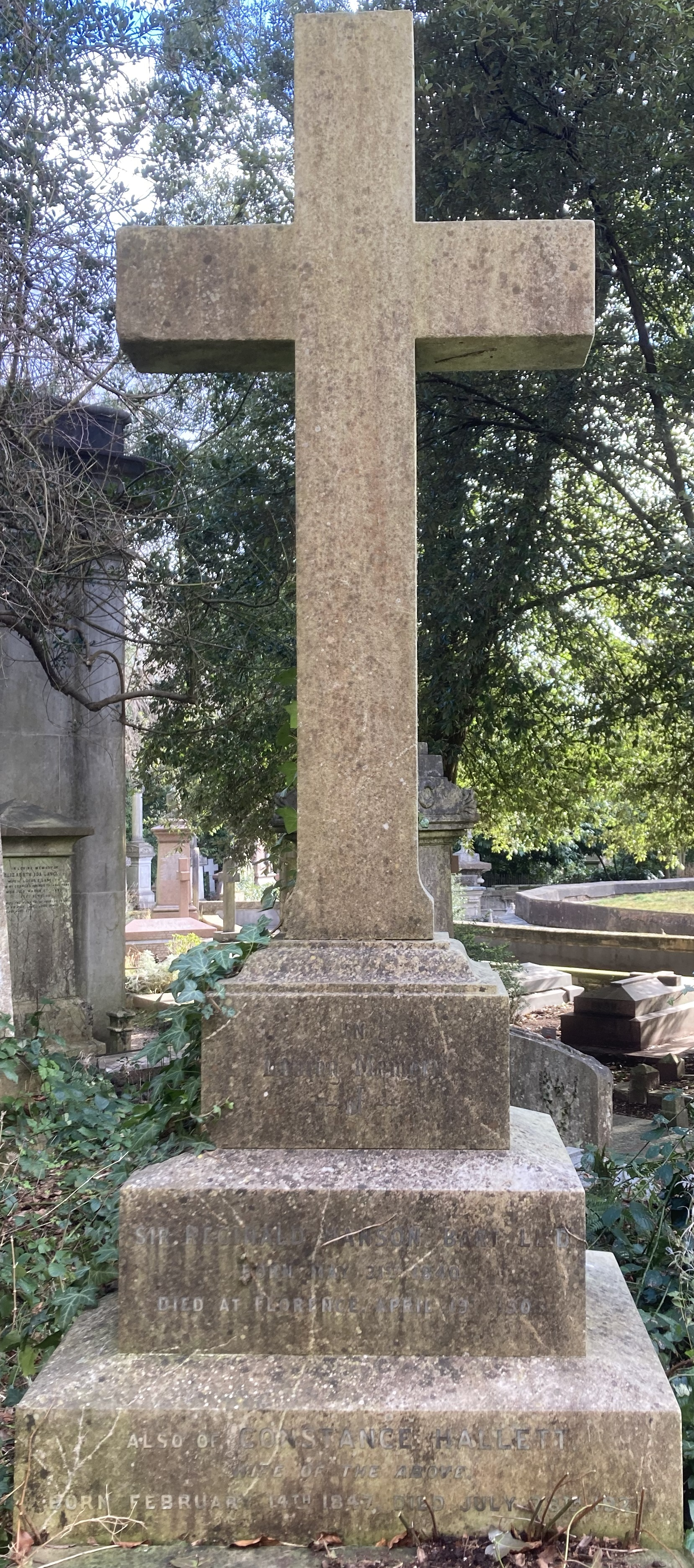
Grave of Sir Reginald Hanson in Highgate Cemetery

Sir Reginald Hanson, 1st Baronet, JP, DL, FSA (31 May 1840 – 18 April 1905) was Lord Mayor of London and a British Conservative Party politician.

The son of Samuel and Mary Hanson (née Choppin), Reginald was educated at Tonbridge School, Rugby School and Trinity College, Cambridge (MA, LLD). The then headmaster of Rugby School Dr Frederick Temple (later Archbishop of Canterbury) said of Hanson on his departure, "I have a most sincere and warm regard for him. The manly desire he shows to get rid of his faults, and to do his duty, will always deserve the respect of all who know him. There are a few from who I part with so much regret at my own loss". Indeed, this sense of duty was upheld and he held numerous positions of public office.

Following graduation, the young Reginald joined the Commercial Union Assurance Company (now part of Aviva plc) which was previously co-founded by his father Samuel. Within a year he was appointed to the Board of directors where he remained until 1882. By this time, he had already joined the family wholesale grocery business, Samuel Hanson & Son Limited.

He held a number of civic posts notably as an Alderman of Billingsgate (London) from 1880 and Sheriff of London and Middlesex, 1881–82. From 1882 to 1885 Hanson was a member of the London School Board. In 1886, he was elected Lord Mayor of London, during which time Queen Victoria celebrated her Jubilee year. In 1887, Sir Reginald entertained Her Majesty at the Mansion House where he was created a Baronet by her, having previously been knighted. Guests that day included the explorer Henry Morton Stanley and Judge Thomas Hughes author of Tom Brown's Schooldays.

Conservative Member of Parliament for the City of London from 1891 to 1900, Hanson was also appointed Honorary Colonel of the 4th (Royal London Militia) Battalion, Royal Fusiliers (later 6th Battalion) on 21 October 1882.

He died in 1905 and is buried on the west side of Highgate Cemetery, leaving behind two sons, Gerald (Sir Gerald Stanhope Hanson, 2nd Baronet), Francis (Sir Francis Stanhope Hanson - Knight Bachelor) and two daughters, Violet and Maud. Actor Michael Craig is his great-grandson.

Parliament of the United Kingdom
Preceded by Hucks Gibbs; Thomas Charles Baring	Member of Parliament for The City of London; 1891–1900; With: Hucks Gibbs 1891–1892; Alban Gibbs 1892–1906	Succeeded by Sir Joseph Cockfield Dimsdale; Alban Gibbs
Civic offices
Preceded by Sir John Staples	Lord Mayor of London; 1886 – 1887	Succeeded by Sir Polydore de Keyser
Baronetage of the United Kingdom
New creation	Baronet (of Bryanston Square); 1887–1905	Succeeded by Sir Gerald Stanhope Hanson
