= Vicary Gibbs (St Albans MP) =

British politician (1853–1932)

Gibbs in 1895

Vicary Gibbs (12 May 1853 – 13 January 1932) was a British barrister, merchant and Conservative Party politician. He sat in the House of Commons from 1892 to 1904. He lost his seat after his business created a conflict of interest. He was the editor of the early volumes of The Complete Peerage (second edition).

== Early life and family ==
Gibbs came from an old Devon family. He was the third son of Hucks Gibbs, 1st Baron Aldenham (1819–1907), and his wife Louisa Anne, daughter of William Adams.

Alban Gibbs, 2nd Baron Aldenham, and Herbert Gibbs, 1st Baron Hunsdon of Hunsdon, were his brothers, while George Edward Cokayne was his great-uncle. His great-grandfather was Antony Gibbs, brother of Sir Vicary Gibbs who became Chief Justice of the Common Pleas.

He was educated at Eton College and at Christ Church, Oxford, where he graduated in 1876 with a Bachelor of Arts degree in Classical Moderations. He was called to the bar at Lincoln's Inn in 1880, and became a partner in the merchant and banking firm Antony Gibbs & Sons.

== Political career ==
At the 1892 general election he was returned to Parliament for St Albans division of Hertfordshire.

He was returned unopposed in 1895 and 1900, but was disqualified in February 1904. He and his brother Alban were partners in the firm Antony Gibbs & Sons, which had organised the sale to the Admiralty of two warships which had been built in England for the Chilean Navy, to avoid them being sold to a rival power when Chile did not complete the purchase. However, in so doing he was disqualified from the House of Commons, under provisions which debarred MPs from accepting contracts from the Crown. He told his constituents on 18 January that he would resign from the Commons by taking the Chiltern Hundreds, and then present himself for re-election. Both Gibbs and the Liberal Party candidate John Bamford Slack were by then campaigning in the constituency, but The Times newspaper reported on 20 January that the by-election was unlikely to be contested by the Liberals. However, since Gibbs was already disqualified, he did not need to take the usual step of disqualifying himself by taking the Chiltern Hundreds, and in a letter of 1 February 1904 he informed the Speaker of the contract that "I am advised that by so doing I have, under an Act of George III, vacated my seat in Parliament".

His letter was read to the Commons on 2 February, and the writ was moved the following day.

In the meantime, the Liberals had decided to contest the seat, and at a meeting on 24 January they had adopted Slack as their candidate.

At the resulting by-election on 12 February 1904, Slack won the seat with a majority of 132 votes (1.4% of the total). At the 1906 general election Gibbs stood unsuccessfully in Bradford Central, campaigning as a tariff reformer, but never returned to the Commons. He was a member of the Tariff Commission and of the Council of the Industrial Freedom League, an organisation which opposed the involvement of the state and municipalities in trading companies.

== After politics ==
Gibbs was also a Justice of the Peace for Hertfordshire, and the first co-editor of the second edition of The Complete Peerage; published beginning in 1910. While he retired well before it completed publication, his extensive notes are represented throughout the volumes. He was a director of numerous companies, and the chairman of National Provident Institution.

At his seat Aldenham House near Elstree in Hertfordshire, he cultivated a garden which became notable for its flowering trees and shrubs. He won many prizes for the flowers and vegetables grown by his head gardener Edwin Beckett FRHS, including a first prize at the Franco-British Exhibition in 1908.

He was a member of the Athenaeum Club and the Carlton Club.

== Death ==
In January 1932 Gibbs died aged 78 at his London home in Upper Belgrave Street; he never married, and most of his huge plant collection at Aldenham was auctioned by Sotheby's in October that year.

== See also ==
- Baron Aldenham
- Baron Hunsdon of Hunsdon

Parliament of the United Kingdom
Preceded by Viscount Grimston	Member of Parliament for St Albans; 1892–1904	Succeeded by John Bamford Slack
