= Antony Gibbs, 5th Baron Aldenham =

British peer

The Right Honourable The Lord Aldenham

Member of the House of Lords
- Lord Temporal
- In office 30 May 1969 – 25 January 1986
- Preceded by: The 4th Baron Aldenham
- Succeeded by: The 6th Baron Aldenham

Personal details
- Born: Antony Durant Gibbs; 18 May 1922
- Died: 25 January 1986 (aged 63)

Antony Durant Gibbs, 5th Baron Aldenham, 3rd Baron Hunsdon of Hunsdon (18 May 1922 – 25 January 1986), was a British peer, the son of Walter Gibbs, 4th Baron Aldenham, and his wife Beatrix Elinor (née Paul). He succeeded to the titles Baron Hunsdon and Baron Aldenham on 30 May 1969.

He married Mary Elizabeth Tyser (1921-2022) on 16 July 1947. They had four children.

- Vicary Tyser Gibbs, 6th Baron Aldenham (b. 9 June 1948)
- George Henry Paul Gibbs (b. 17 June 1950)
- William Humphrey Durant Gibbs (1954–1973)
- Antonia Mary Gibbs (b. 10 July 1958)

Peerage of the United Kingdom
| Preceded by Walter Gibbs | Baron Aldenham; 1969–1986 | Succeeded by Vicary Gibbs |
| Preceded by Walter Gibbs | Baron Hunsdon; 3rd creation 1969–1986 | Succeeded by Vicary Gibbs |
