= Walter Gibbs, 4th Baron Aldenham =

Captain Walter Durant Gibbs, 4th Baron Aldenham, 2nd Baron Hunsdon of Hunsdon (11 August 1888 – 30 May 1969), was a British peer, the son of Herbert Cokayne Gibbs, 1st Baron Hunsdon of Hunsdon. He succeeded to the title 2nd Baron Hunsdon on 22 May 1935. He succeeded to the title 4th Baron Aldenham on 21 March 1939, on the death of his cousin, the 3rd Baron, who died without male issue. He served in the Hertfordshire Yeomanry.

He married Beatrix Elinor Paul (1890–1978), on 6 November 1919. Lady Aldenham had a daughter, Theresa, and a son, Charles, from her first marriage to Algernon Villiers, son of Francis Hyde Villiers.

They had two sons together:

- Captain The Hon. Vicary Paul Gibbs (1921–1944) m. Jean Hambro
- Antony Durant Gibbs, 5th Baron Aldenham (1922–1986)

Peerage of the United Kingdom
Preceded by Gerald Gibbs	Baron Aldenham; 1939–1969	Succeeded by Antony Gibbs
Preceded by Herbert Gibbs	Baron Hunsdon; 3rd creation 1935–1969	Succeeded by Antony Gibbs
