= Eustace Gibbs, 3rd Baron Wraxall =

Eustace Hubert Beilby Gibbs, 3rd Baron Wraxall, KCVO, CMG (3 July 1929 – 17 May 2017), was a British diplomat and hereditary peer who succeeded his brother, Richard Gibbs, 2nd Baron Wraxall, on 19 July 2001.

== Early life and background ==
He was the second son of George Gibbs, 1st Baron Wraxall, by his second wife, the Hon. Ursula Mary Lawley. He was educated at Eton College and Christ Church, Oxford.

== Diplomatic career ==
Gibbs was appointed to be the British Consul General at Paris in April 1977. He also served as Her Majesty's Vice-Marshal of the Diplomatic Corps from 1982 to 1986.

Gibbs was appointed to the Order of St Michael and St George as a Companion in the 1982 Birthday Honours. In the 1986 New Year Honours, he was appointed to the Royal Victorian Order as a Knight Commander.

== Succession ==
He died on 17 May 2017 at the age of 87. He was succeeded in the title by his son, the Hon. Antony Gibbs (born 1958). The family's former seat is Tyntesfield near Wraxall, now owned by The National Trust.

Peerage of the United Kingdom
Preceded by Richard Gibbs	Baron Wraxall; 2001–2017	Succeeded by Antony Gibbs
