= Hanson baronets =

Set index for Hanson baronets

There have been two baronetcies created for persons with the surname Hanson, both in the Baronetage of the United Kingdom. As of 2026 one creation is extant.

- Hanson baronets of Bryanston Square (1887)
- Hanson baronets of Fowey (1918)
