= Vicary Gibbs, 6th Baron Aldenham =

British peer (born 1948)

The Right Honourable The Lord Aldenham

Member of the House of Lords
- Lord Temporal
- In office 25 January 1986 – 11 November 1999 as a hereditary peer
- Preceded by: The 5th Baron Aldenham
- Succeeded by: Seat abolished (Note: Pursuant to the House of Lords Act 1999.)

Personal details
- Born: Vicary Tyser Gibbs; 9 June 1948 (age 77)
- Spouse: Josephine Nicola née Fell

Vicary Tyser Gibbs, 6th Baron Aldenham, 4th Baron Hunsdon of Hunsdon (born 9 June 1948), is a British peer, the son of Antony Gibbs, 5th Baron Aldenham. He succeeded to the titles Baron Aldenham and Baron Hunsdon of Hunsdon on 25 January 1986.

He served in the House of Lords from 25 January 1986 until 11 November 1999.

He married Josephine Nicola Fell on 16 May 1980. They have four children.

Gibbs is the majority shareholder of Elstree Aerodrome.

== Notes ==
Peerage of the United Kingdom
Preceded by Antony Gibbs	Baron Aldenham; 1986–present Member of the House of Lords (1986–1999)	Incumbent; Heir apparent: Humphrey Gibbs
Preceded by Antony Gibbs	Baron Hunsdon; 3rd creation 1986–present	Incumbent; Heir apparent: Humphrey Gibbs
