= Antony Gibbs & Sons =

Former British trading company

- Company type: Partnership (1808–1973); Public limited company (1973–1981)
- Founded: 1808 (218 years ago)
- Founder: Antony Gibbs; William Gibbs; Henry Gibbs
- Defunct: 22 June 2005
- Fate: Dissolved
- Successor: HSBC Commercial Insurance (1981–2012); Marsh & McLennan (2012–present)
- Number of locations: London; Bristol; Liverpool; Melbourne; Lima; Valparaíso
- Area served: Global
- Key people: Alban Gibbs; Vicary Gibbs
- Services: Trading Woollen Cloth; Import/Export Spanish wine, Fruit, Guano; Shipping; Merchant Bank; Insurance Brokerage

Antony Gibbs & Sons was a British trading company, which was founded by Antony Gibbs in 1808 in London. The company's interests spanned trading in cloth, fruit, wine, guano, and nitrate, which led to it becoming involved in banking, shipping and insurance. Having been family-owned from its foundation, by the turn of the 20th century it was focused on banking and insurance rather than import and export.

Floated on the London Stock Exchange in 1973, it was bought by HSBC in 1981 and formed the basis of its insurance broking arm, now part of global insurance company Marsh McLennan.

== Antony Gibbs (1756–1815) ==
=== Early life ===
Antony Gibbs was born in Exeter, Devon; he was the third son of Dr. George Abraham Gibbs (1718–1794), from Clyst St George, Devon, Chief Surgeon at the Royal Devon and Exeter Hospital. After leaving Exeter Grammar School, Antony Gibbs was apprenticed to merchant Nicholas Brooke, whose firm exported locally made woollen cloth to Spain. Brooke sent Antony to Madrid, where he became fluent in Spanish.

After his apprenticeship ended in 1778, Antony set up in business exporting cloth to Spain, Italy and elsewhere with his brother Abraham (1754–1782). After Abraham's early death in 1782, in 1784 Antony married his brother's former fiancée Dorothea Barnetta Hucks (Dolly). With money borrowed from his father, in 1786 Antony established a cloth factory at Exwick in the outskirts of Exeter – Gibbs, Granger & Banfill. However by 1789 Antony Gibbs had over extended himself, borrowing from his father and others, and both he and his father were declared bankrupt in 1789, leaving them with debts of £40,000.

=== Spain and Portugal ===
Following his business failure in Exeter, in 1789 Antony Gibbs moved to Madrid with his wife and children, where he spent nearly 20 years acting as an agent for several merchant houses in England (including the Exwick factory) and trading in his own right. His son William was born in Madrid in May 1790. Antony wished to clear his name and repay his creditors, and whilst in Spain he formed a business network, and began exporting cloth from England to the Iberian peninsula, and exporting Spanish wine and fruit back to England. Driven out of Spain by war in 1797 he conducted his business in Lisbon from 1798 to 1801, but in 1802 returned to Spain and became established as a merchant in Cadiz. In 1804 with the likely outbreak of war between Spain and Britain, Antony needed a new market for his goods, and he realised that he could trade with the Spanish colonies in South America. In 1806 he chartered the Hermosa Mexicana with a shipment of textiles for the round trip from Lisbon to Lima; on the return journey importing produce from Peru into London. This was the start of the family's trade with South America which would go on to make the Gibbs fortune.

=== Foundation of Antony Gibbs & Son ===
In 1808 Antony relocated his family and business to London, buying a home on Dulwich Common. With the help of his brother Sir Vicary Gibbs (1751–1820), Antony was named as one of four Commissioners in London for dealing with Portuguese ships and goods sent to England following Spain's invasion of Portugal in the Peninsula War. In September 1808 he founded the firm of Antony Gibbs & Son with his eldest son (George) Henry Gibbs (1785–1842) who, although christened George, was always referred to by his second name, Henry. Another son, William Gibbs (1789–1875) who had been working for George Gibbs and Sons in Bristol, moved to London to act as clerk to the Commission and to his father's firm. By 1813 Henry had been made a partner managing the London office, and William was in Spain, running the office there. This same year the firm was renamed Antony Gibbs & Sons when William joined the partnership.

== Gibbs family members' continuation in the business ==
Antony Gibbs died in 1815, and on his father's death his son William returned home to run the business with his brother Henry. The two vowed to repay their father and grandfather's debts from their bankruptcies in 1789, and had done so with all interest paid by 1840. After Henry's death in 1842, his son Henry Hucks Gibbs (1819–1907) joined the firm, with his uncle William as the senior partner.

The firm was based in London at 13 Sherborne Lane, Lombard Street (from ca. 1809), 20 Great Winchester Street (1814–15), 28 Great Winchester Street (1815–26), 47 Lime Street (1826–50) and 15 Bishopsgate, later numbered 22 Bishopsgate (1850–?).

Many members of the Gibbs family continued as partners / Directors of the firm after Henry Hucks Gibbs' death in 1907 including: George Louis Monck Gibbs, Alban George Henry Gibbs, Vicary Gibbs, Herbert Cokayne Gibbs, Henry Lloyd Gibbs, John Arthur Gibbs, Gerald Henry Beresford Gibbs, Walter Durant Gibbs, Geoffrey Cokayne Gibbs, Leonard Charles Michael Gibbs, and Antony Durant Gibbs.

Many of those listed above spent time in the firm's South American or Australian offices as well as in London.

== Guano trade ==
=== First contracts ===
In the 1820s, taking advantage of the break up of the Spanish colonial empire, the firm seized opportunities to trade with South America, and opened offices in Lima (1822), Guayaquil and Arequipa (1823), and Valparaiso (1826). The firm exported English goods to South America, and imported on commission to Europe goods such as cocoa, cotton, and bark (later exports included copper, tin, silver, alpaca and wool). The firm also started insuring goods and accepting financial deposits and securities on behalf of other clients. By 1832 their business in South America, as well as their merchant banking in London, were doing well, and over the next ten years the company was consistently in profit as it became the principal firm in London trading on the Pacific coast.

The company's fortune changed in 1842 when their agent in South America signed contracts with the Peruvian and Bolivian governments to purchase consignments of guano. The company were not the only foreign firm to sign a contract with Peru to export guano, but they were the most important because they were able to loan the largest amount of money to the Peruvian government. William called it 'an act of insanity' because of the huge loans needed to facilitate the business; but, rich in nitrogen and phosphate, thanks to the Gibbs' promotion of guano in Britain, it soon became accepted by farmers as an essential fertiliser.

=== William Gibbs and profits made from the guano trade ===
Between 1842 and 1847 their contracts with the Peruvian and Bolivian Governments for importing guano made net proceeds of £831,006 and £126,915 respectively. From 1850 they were dealing purely with the Peruvian Government.

The National Trust asserts that 'the firm used enslaved labour to extract the guano before slavery was outlawed in Peru in 1854; their labour also included convicts, conscripts and army deserters', and that from 1842 to 1861 when they were operating their guano business, 'workers' conditions, including pay and medical care, improved under Gibbs's control, coupled with pressure from external observers.' However, Johnson asserts that: 'Like many foreign merchants during the nineteenth century, Gibbs were removed from the guano extraction process. They had very little involvement in the physical loading and digging of guano at the islands', and she goes on to describe who the Peruvian Government contracted for the guano extraction.

The firm was importing 100,000 tons of guano a year, buying at about $15 and selling for $50 a ton. They had a monopoly on the trade which peaked between 1850 and 1856 when they imported over 214,700 tons of guano into Britain alone.

At its height every year between 300 and 400 ships were leaving the Chincha Islands off Peru with guano. Due to losses from over-laden ships, the firm implemented a surveyor's certificate for the height of the side of the laden ship, and in 1860 William Gibbs came up with the idea of marking that point. This led in 1876 to the Merchant Shipping Act which made the Plimsoll line compulsory on all British ships.

The firm's profits from the guano trade were immense, which made William Gibbs rich as the sole partner from 1842–1847 and thereafter he received from 50–70% of the firms' profits, so that by the 1860s he had £1,500,000 in the business. His share of profits in the company allowed him to purchase land in what is now North Somerset and build the property now owned by the National Trust, Tyntesfield. According to the Times newspaper he was the richest commoner in England.

Towards the end of the C19th William Gibbs inspired a popular music hall song: "William Gibbs made his dibs, Selling the turds of foreign birds"

When William retired in 1858, he left his nephew Henry Hucks Gibbs as senior partner, whilst retaining a stake in the business, and when William died in 1875 he bequeathed the majority of his share in the partnership to Henry who ran the firm from 1875 to 1907.

== Diversification in South America ==
The company's contract with the Peruvian Government ran out in 1861, and they then diversified into other business areas. They were involved in a wide range of trading activities; they made commission by trading on others' behalf, and made finance available for other companies. They invested in government bonds, and also expanded their business by exporting nitrate, copper, wool, cotton, rubber and other goods from South America.

The company closed its Lima branch in 1880 and moved its South American base to Chile, where the company manufactured nitrate of soda and its by-product iodine, as well as being agents for the Chilean State Railways. Nitrate of soda was in demand in the burgeoning European and North American munitions trade: the company supplied the British Government with nitrate of soda for ammunition throughout the First World War.

=== Tambopata Rubber Syndicate ===
In 1907 Antony Gibbs & Sons provided the capital for the newly formed British company, the Tambopata Rubber Syndicate which had two rubber growing estates on the Tambopata River along the Bolivian / Peruvian border. They also bought at £1 each 7501 of the 15,000 shares in Tambopata Rubber. In September 1907 Tambopata Rubber mortgaged its 'estates, farms, works, buildings and concessions' to Antony Gibbs and Sons. The company was contracted to ship and sell all of the rubber extracted by Tambopata Rubber, as well as to provide the machinery needed for the business. The Tambopata Rubber Syndicate, along with The Inca Mining Company and the Inca Rubber Company controlled %74 of the land ceded out by the Peruvian government around the Inambari and Tambopata Rivers during the rubber boom.

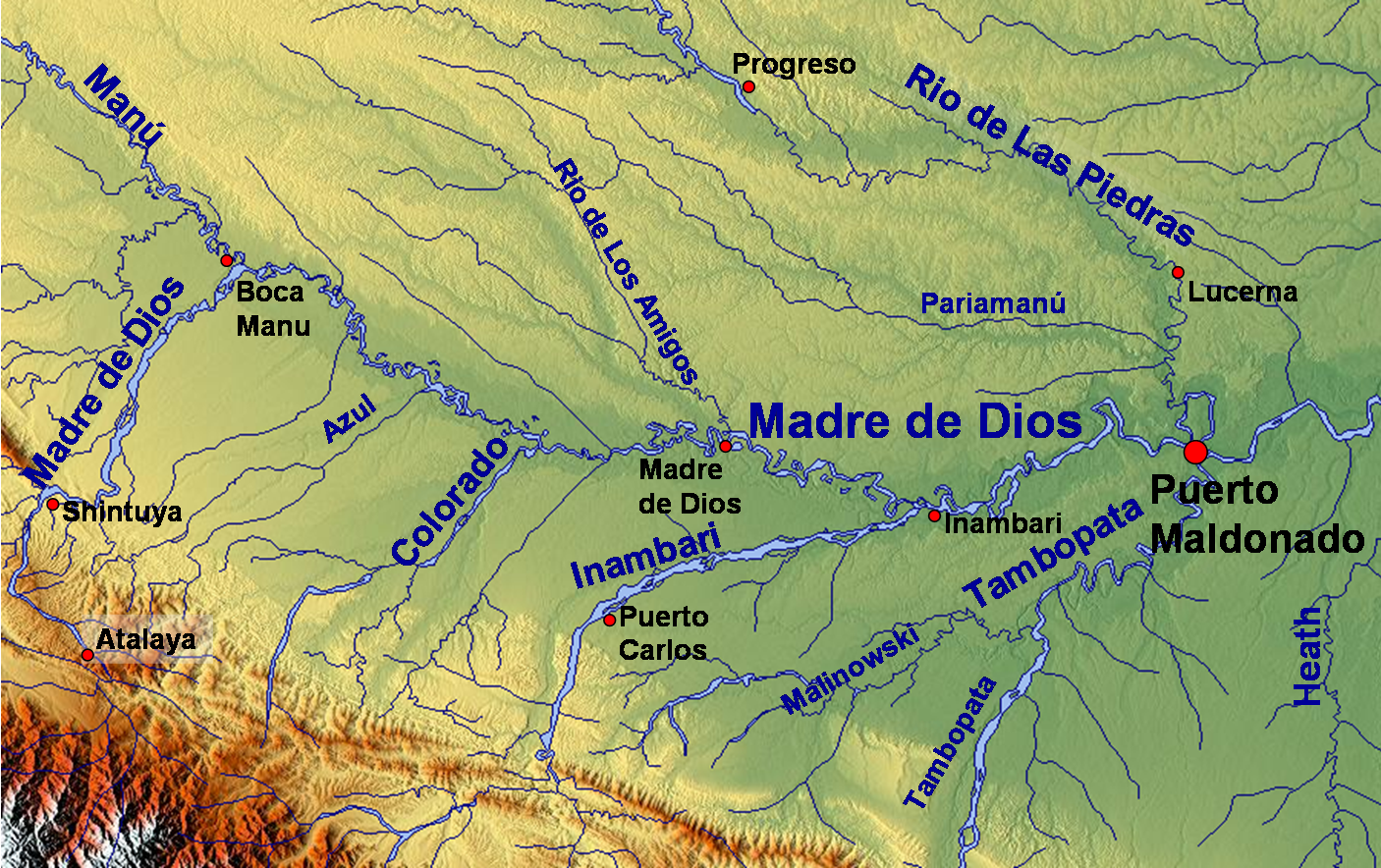
Map depicting the tributaries of the Madre de Dios River, including the Tambopata River.

The Tambopata Rubber Syndicate used a form of bonded labour, which meant their workforce of 300–500 indigenous people were given benefits such as food or accommodation, which they were charged interest for and then had to pay off, leaving them in debt, even after they'd died. Workers were also found starving, and were often punished. The Anti-Slavery Society collected records of workers' conditions. However, researcher Nic Madge concludes 'There is nothing to indicate that the Gibbs partners were directly aware of the extent of the oppression of indigenous people.'

By 1912 Antony Gibbs and Sons decided to gradually liquidate the business as they didn't feel they could compete with other rubber producing companies, and ended up making a significant loss. This was due to several reasons, including: consistent labor shortages; difficult and expensive transportation; insufficient food in the region; and the fact that rubber trees in the Tambopata estate had to be cut down in order to extract their latex, thus meaning workers had to travel further and further to extract the rubber. Gibbs also claimed that it was three times more expensive to extract rubber in South America than it was in the Far East.

== Acquisition of Gibbs, Bright & Co. and the SS Great Britain ==
=== Gibbs, Bright and Co., Bristol ===
In 1881 Antony Gibbs and Sons absorbed a company which originated in Bristol in the C18th and by 1839 was trading as Gibbs, Bright and Co. In 1789 Antony Gibbs' elder brother, George Gibbs (1753–1818) had entered into partnership with his cousin Samuel Munckley, a merchant trading with the West Indies in slave-grown produce, based in Bristol, but also originally from Exeter. He was joined by his son, George Gibbs (1769–1863) in 1802. The company was renamed George Gibbs and Son in 1808. George Junior was married to William Gibbs' sister, Harriet, in 1814, and became head of the firm with his father's death in 1818, when another Bristol merchant, Robert Bright became a partner. The company had originally made its money by being involved in the slavery economy, as merchants importing slave grown sugar from the West Indies. With the abolition of slavery in 1834 George Gibbs and Robert Bright received compensation for some plantations on which they were mortgagees, or which they managed on behalf of the Bright family.

By the 1880s Gibbs, Bright and Co. still imported sugar and owned plantations in the Caribbean, but its main business was as a leading shipping and insurance agent, having opened an office in Liverpool in 1805. In 1852 Gibbs, Bright and Co., had purchased the SS Great Britain (originally launched in 1843) for carrying emigrants to Australia sailing out of Liverpool. However, by 1876 the SS Great Britain had become outdated and emigrant numbers were falling. She returned to Liverpool from Australia, and lay idle at Birkenhead for five years before she was acquired for £6,500 by Antony Gibbs & Sons for bulk trade between Britain and San Francisco.

=== Merging of the two firms ===
1881 was the year in which Antony Gibbs and Sons absorbed Gibbs, Bright and Co., and the two companies became one. From 1882 the SS Great Britain carried mainly Welsh coal and wheat. In 1886 she was badly damaged in a storm off Cape Horn and beyond economic repair, so the company sold her to the Falkland Islands Company.

In 1881 Gibbs, Bright and Co. had branches in Liverpool, Australia and Dunedin, New Zealand, and once absorbed into Antony Gibbs and Sons, the company established further branches across Australia. They established steamer services between Australia and New Zealand, and in the 1890s the Intercolonial Steamship Company serving Australian coastal ports. The company closed the Bristol office in 1887, which was primarily trading with the West Indies and transferred their staff to Liverpool. The Liverpool office closed in 1909, with staff transferring to London where their business was on the Baltic chartering ships for their nitrate business in Europe and the U.S.

They branched out into many other areas of business, and by 1963 the company was the largest trading partnership in the Southern Hemisphere with interests in mining, shipping, farming activities (with several million acres of sheep and cattle stations), insurance, building materials, timber and merchant banking.

== Bankers and financiers ==
Early in his career Antony Gibbs acted as a private banker to his clients in Spain, South America and elsewhere. He had bought and sold securities, and collected dividends on behalf of clients, as well as accepting bills of sale. These banking activities became an integral part of his business which his descendants who took on the firm developed into the C20th.

In 1887 Antony Gibbs and Sons invited subscriptions for shares of the Hotchkiss Ordnance Co. Ltd. (armaments manufacturer) to the value of just over £1 million. Thus it became a Merchant Bank. In 1890 the firm was part of the Bank of England's syndicate set up to bail out Barings Bank during the Baring crisis. At this time Henry Hucks Gibbs was both a partner in Antony Gibbs and Sons, and Director of the Bank of England.

The company issued many other loans around this time such as £6m to the Mexican Government; £5m to the Greek Government; £600,000 to the Argentine N. E. Railway; £400,000 to the United States Brewery Co.; £320,000 to the Jamaica Railway; and £250,000 to the State of San Lui Potosi in Mexico.

They were also shareholders and financial backers of the Mexican Railways and the Mexican Gas and Electric Light Company for whom they ordered and shipped the company's initial plant and equipment from Britain.

== Chilean and Argentinian war ships ==
In late 1901 Chile and Argentina were involved in a naval arms race. In 1902, as part of the Pacts of May, which ended the near-war tensions between the two countries, Argentina sold its two warships that were under construction in Italy to Japan. As a result, in 1903 Chile also put its warships up for sale.

Whilst the United Kingdom was not entirely interested in the ships, international politics took precedence: when the Russian Empire made an offer for the ships, the British grew concerned that the two ships could be used against their new ally Japan. By now Antony Gibbs & Sons was run by the partnership of Alban Gibbs and his younger brother Vicary Gibbs who offered to finance the Admiralty's purchase of the ships. As a result, the Admiralty purchased both Chilean battleships on 3 December 1903 for £2,432,000, which were renamed from Constitución and Libertad to Triumph and Swiftsure.

== Later history ==
In 1973, the company was floated on the London Stock Exchange. During the initial float, Midland Bank acquired a stake, and in 1981 HSBC acquired the complete business as part of its global expansion (the American bank Marine Midland had already been acquired) being the first step in establishing a higher profile in the London financial markets as HSBC looked to take advantage of ongoing relaxing of the rules and regulations over the following years. The non banking operations formed the basis of HSBC Insurance Brokers. Having dissolved the company in 2005 and fully absorbed the assets ito their group structure, HSBC later sold their commercial insurance broking arm to Marsh McLennan in 2012, many of which include the Gibbs name.

== Company names ==
Antony Gibbs and Sons traded in the U.K. and overseas under a variety of names:

- In London as: Antony Gibbs and Son (1808–1812); Antony Gibbs and Sons (1813–1948); Antony Gibbs and Sons Ltd. (1948–?). Other related companies based in London were Antony Gibbs & Sons (Insurance) Ltd. (1930–?); Antony Gibbs & Sons (Nominees) Ltd. (1932–?); Antony Gibbs & Sons (LIfe & Pensions) Ltd. (1955–?)
- In Liverpool as: Antony Gibbs, Sons & Co. (1881–1909)
- In Bristol as: Antony Gibbs, Sons & Co. (1881–1887)
- In Cadiz, Spain as: Antony Gibbs and Son (1808); Antony Gibbs, Son and Branscombe (1808–13); and Antony Gibbs Son and Co. (1814–27)
- In Gibraltar as: Gibbs, Casson and Co (1818–33)
- In Peru and Chile as: Gibbs, Crawley, Moens and Co. (1822–24); Gibbs, Crawley and Co. (1824–47); William Gibbs and Co. (1847–79); Gibbs and Co. (1880–1948); Gibbs y Cia S.A.C. (1948–?) and Gibbs, Williamson Ltd. (1933–?)
- In Bolivia and Brazil as: Gibbs Williamson (Bolivia) Ltd. (1945–?); Gibbs Williamson S.A. Brazil (1944–?)
- In Australasia as: Gibbs, Bright & Co. (previously Bright Bros. & Co.) (1881–?)
- In New York as: Antony Gibbs and Co. (1913–20); and Antony Gibbs and Co. Inc. (1920–?)
- In South Africa as: Gibbs Foley & Co. (Pty) Ltd. (1952–?)
- In Zimbabwe (formerly Rhodesia) as: Gibbs & Co. (Central Africa) (Pvt) Ltd. (1950–?)

Records of Antony Gibbs and Sons are held at London Metropolitan Archives and the National Library of Australia.
