= Richard Gibbs, 2nd Baron Wraxall =

British baron (1928–2001)

The Right Honourable The Lord Wraxall DL

Member of the House of Lords
- Lord Temporal
- In office 29 October 1943 – 11 November 1999 as a hereditary peer
- Preceded by: The 1st Baron Wraxall
- Succeeded by: Seat abolished (Note: Pursuant to the House of Lords Act 1999.)

Personal details
- Born: George Richard Lawley Gibbs; 16 May 1928
- Died: 19 July 2001 (aged 73)
- Party: Crossbench

George Richard Lawley Gibbs, 2nd Baron Wraxall (16 May 1928 – 19 July 2001), who used the forename Richard, was a British hereditary peer.

== Early life and background ==
Gibbs succeeded his father, George Gibbs, 1st Baron Wraxall, in the barony on 28 October 1931 at the age of three. His mother was the Hon. Ursula Mary Lawley, daughter of Arthur Lawley, 6th Baron Wenlock. His godmother was Queen Mary of Teck.

== Kidnapping ==
In 1988, Lord Wraxall was kidnapped at his home Tyntesfield and locked in the boot of his BMW for almost seven hours. Afterwards according to The Times, he said "Good grief, there's more room in the back than I ever thought". The kidnappers had knocked him to the ground, one battering him on the head with a plank, and demanded the combination to his safe and his house keys, but the burglar alarm went off and, in a panic, the raiders bundled Lord Wraxall into the boot of his car and drove him to woods about two miles away, before making off with his wallet and credit cards.

== Later life and death ==
Wraxall was appointed to be a Deputy Lieutenant of the County of Somerset by the Lord Lieutenant in 1996. He died unmarried in July 2001, aged 73, and was succeeded by his younger brother Eustace.

== See also ==
- List of kidnappings
- Lists of solved missing person cases

== Notes ==
Peerage of the United Kingdom
Preceded by George Gibbs	Baron Wraxall; 1931–2001; Member of the House of Lords (1943–1999)	Succeeded by Eustace Gibbs
