= Timothy Whidborne =

British artist (1927–2021)

Timothy Charles Plunket Whidborne (1927–2021) was a British artist notable for his 1969 portrait of Queen Elizabeth II on horseback as Colonel-in-Chief of the Irish Guards, a regiment in which Whidborne had once been a member.

Born in High Wycombe, Whidborne was educated at Stowe School, where he was a contemporary of George Melly. He served as a lieutenant in the Irish Guards and saw action in Mandatory Palestine. In 1949, he became a pupil of Pietro Annigoni. Whidborne exhibited at the Royal Academy in 1954, and in 1966, The Connoisseur recognized him as a leading mural decorator in England.

In 1983, he was among the artists selected to design alternative stamps for the British definitive series, but his design was not adopted, and the Machin series remained in use for the Queen's lifetime.

== Selected publications ==
- Pietro Annigoni: Il Periodo Inglese, 1949-1971. Leonardo-De Luca, Rome, 1991. Edited by Luciano Pelizzari, contribution by Timothy Whidborne. ISBN 8878133973
- Woolly the Mammoth. Pheasantry Studios, London, 1993. ISBN 0952292408
- Aspects of Deal. Pheasantry Studios, London, 2002. ISBN 0952292416
- Aspects of Ireland. Pheasantry Studios, London, 2003. ISBN 0952292424
- Aspects Abroad. Pheasantry Studios, London, 2005. ISBN 0952292440 (new edition)
- Aspects Diverse. Pheasantry Studios, London, 2008. ISBN 0952292459
- A Cabinet of Curiosities. Pheasantry Studios, London, 2008. ISBN 0952292467
- Aspects of Love and Passion. Pheasantry Studios, London, 2008. ISBN 0952292475
- Aspects of Psychology. Pheasantry Studios, London, 2010. ISBN 0952292483
- Aspects of Art and Ancestry. Grosvenor House, Tolworth, 2019. ISBN 9781786234735
- Images: Paintings and Drawings by Timothy Charles Plunket Whidborne. Grosvenor House, Tolworth, 2020. ISBN 9781839750274
