= Hucks Gibbs, 1st Baron Aldenham =

British politician (1819–1907)

The Right Honourable The Lord Aldenham FGS FSA
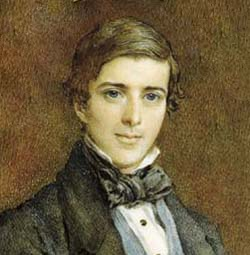
- Hucks Gibbs, 1st Baron Aldenham

Member of the House of Lords
- Lord Temporal
- In office 31 January 1896 – 13 September 1907
- Preceded by: Peerage created
- Succeeded by: The 2nd Baron Aldenham

Governor of the Bank of England
- In office 1875–1877
- Preceded by: Benjamin Buck Greene
- Succeeded by: Edward Howley Palmer

Personal details
- Born: Henry Hucks Gibbs; 31 August 1819
- Died: 13 September 1907 (aged 88)
- Political party: Conservative
- Spouse: Louisa Anne Adams (m. 1845; died 1897)
- Children: 7, including Alban, Vicary, Herbert, and Kenneth
- Occupation: Banker, businessman, politician

Henry Hucks Gibbs, 1st Baron Aldenham, FGS, FSA (31 August 1819 – 13 September 1907), was a British banker, businessman and Conservative Party politician.

== Life ==
Aldenham was the son of George Henry Gibbs, whose father Antony Gibbs was a brother of Sir Vicary Gibbs, a Chief Justice of the Common Pleas. He matriculated at Exeter College, Oxford, in 1837, graduating B.A. in 1841, M.A. in 1844.

Gibbs was a senior partner in the family firm of Antony Gibbs & Sons, and was a director of the Bank of England from 1853 to 1901, its deputy governor, and finally its Governor from 1875 to 1877.

He was elected as a Member of Parliament (MP) for the City of London at an unopposed by-election in April 1891, and held the seat until the general election in July 1892, when his oldest son Alban was elected in his place. He also held the office of High Sheriff of Hertfordshire in 1884. In 1896 he was raised to the peerage as Baron Aldenham, of Aldenham in the County of Hertford. A member of the Philological Society, he was a major benefactor to the Oxford English Dictionary.

== Family ==
Lord Aldenham married Louisa Anne Adams, daughter of William Adams and Mary Anne Cokayne, in 1845. Their fourth son, Herbert, was created Baron Hunsdon of Hunsdon in 1923, while their fifth son, Kenneth, was Archdeacon of St Albans. Lady Aldenham died in 1897. Lord Aldenham survived her by ten years and died in September 1907, aged 88. He was succeeded in the barony by his eldest son Alban.

Children of Lord and Lady Aldenham:

- Alban George Henry Gibbs (1846–1936), heir apparent and successor to the barony
- Edith Caroline Gibbs (1848–1942)
- Walter Antony Gibbs (1850–1858)
- Vicary Gibbs (1853–1932), MP for St Albans 1892–1904
- Herbert Cokayne Gibbs (1854–1935), created Baron Hunsdon of Hunsdon in 1923
- Kenneth Francis Gibbs (1856–1935), Archdeacon of St Albans 1909–1933
- Henry Lloyd Gibbs (1861–1907)

== Sources ==
- Welch, Charles (1912). "Gibbs, Henry Hucks" . In Lee, Sidney (ed.). Dictionary of National Biography (2nd supplement). London: Smith, Elder & Co.
- Kidd, Charles, Williamson, David (editors). Debrett's Peerage and Baronetage (1990 edition). New York: St Martin's Press, 1990.

Parliament of the United Kingdom
Preceded by Thomas Charles Baring; Sir Robert Fowler, Bt	Member of Parliament for City of London; 1891–1892; With: Sir Robert Fowler, Bt until May 1891; Sir Reginald Hanson, Bt from June 1891	Succeeded by Sir Reginald Hanson, Bt; Adrian Gibbs
Government offices
Preceded by Benjamin Buck Greene	Governor of the Bank of England; 1875–1877	Succeeded by Edward Howley Palmer
Honorary titles
Preceded by Salisbury Baxendale	High Sheriff of Hertfordshire; 1884	Succeeded by Sir Astley Paston-Cooper
Peerage of the United Kingdom
New creation	Baron Aldenham; 1896–1907; Member of the House of Lords (1896–1907)	Succeeded by Alban Gibbs
