= Herbert Gibbs, 1st Baron Hunsdon of Hunsdon =

British businessman (1854–1935)

The Honourable Herbert Gibbs
- Born: Herbert Cokayne Gibbs; 14 May 1854; United Kingdom
- Died: 22 May 1935 (aged 81); United Kingdom
- Occupation: Businessman
- Title: Lord Hunsdon
- Children: 6, including Humphrey
- Father: Hucks Gibbs, 1st Baron Aldenham
- Relatives: Christopher Gibbs (grandson)

Herbert Cokayne Gibbs, 1st Baron Hunsdon of Hunsdon (14 May 1854 – 22 May 1935), was a British businessman.

Hunsdon was the fourth son of Hucks Gibbs, 1st Baron Aldenham, and Louisa Anne Adams, and was educated at Winchester and Trinity College, Cambridge. He was a partner in the family firm of Antony Gibbs & Sons, and also served as Commissioner and Chairman of the Public Works Loan Board. In 1908, he bought the Hunsdon Manor and the Briggens estate in Hertfordshire, and served as a justice of the peace and as High Sheriff of the county. In the 1923 Birthday Honours, he was raised to the peerage as Baron Hunsdon of Hunsdon, of Briggens in the County of Hertford.

Lord Hunsdon married Anna Maria, daughter of Richard Durant, in 1885. They had three sons and three daughters. Their sixth child, Sir Humphrey Gibbs, was Governor of Southern Rhodesia. Lord Hunsdon died in May 1935, aged 81, and was succeeded in the barony by his eldest son Walter, who in 1939 also succeeded his cousin to the barony of Aldenham. Lady Hunsdon died in 1938.

Peerage of the United Kingdom
New creation	Baron Hunsdon; 3rd creation 1923–1935	Succeeded by Walter Gibbs
