= Alban Gibbs, 2nd Baron Aldenham =

British politician

The Right Honourable The Lord Aldenham FSA

Member of the House of Lords
- Lord Temporal
- In office 13 September 1907 – 9 May 1936
- Preceded by: The 1st Baron Aldenham
- Succeeded by: The 3rd Baron Aldenham

Personal details
- Born: Alban George Henry Gibbs; 23 April 1846
- Died: 9 May 1936 (aged 90)
- Spouse: Bridget Beresford-Hope (m. 1873)
- Children: 3
- Parents: Hucks Gibbs, 1st Baron Aldenham; Louisa Anne Adams
- Occupation: Member of Parliament

Alban George Henry Gibbs, 2nd Baron Aldenham (23 April 1846 – 9 May 1936), was a British Conservative Party politician and hereditary peer.

Gibbs was the eldest son of Hucks Gibbs, 1st Baron Aldenham, and his wife Louisa Anne (née Adams).

He was elected at the 1892 general election as a Member of Parliament (MP) for the City of London, and held the seat until his resignation from the House of Commons on 14 February 1906 by the procedural device of accepting appointment as Steward of the Manor of Northstead.

He succeeded to the title Baron Aldenham on 13 September 1907.

He married Bridget Beresford-Hope, daughter of Alexander Beresford-Hope, on 18 February 1873. They had three children:

- Catherine Louisa Gibbs (1875–1967)
- Mildred Dorothea Gibbs (1876–1961)
- Gerald Henry Beresford Gibbs, 3rd Baron Aldenham (1879–1939)

He was a member of the London Survey Committee, a voluntary organisation publishing architectural surveys of the capital.

Parliament of the United Kingdom
Preceded by Hucks Gibbs; Sir Reginald Hanson, Bt	Member of Parliament for City of London; 1892 – Feb 1906; With: Sir Reginald Hanson, Bt; Joseph Dimsdale 1900 – Jan 1906; Sir Edward Clarke from Jan 1906	Succeeded by Arthur Balfour; Sir Edward Clarke
Peerage of the United Kingdom
Preceded by Hucks Gibbs	Baron Aldenham; 1907–1936; Member of the House of Lords (1907–1936)	Succeeded by Gerald Gibbs
