= Grade II* listed buildings in North Somerset =

North Somerset shown within the ceremonial county of Somerset

North Somerset is a unitary authority in the ceremonial county of Somerset, England. As a unitary authority, North Somerset is administered independently of the non-metropolitan county of Somerset. Its administrative headquarters are located in the town hall of Weston-super-Mare.

In the United Kingdom, the term listed building refers to a building or other structure officially designated as being of special architectural, historical or cultural significance; Grade II* structures are those considered to be "particularly significant buildings of more than local interest". Listing was begun by a provision in the Town and Country Planning Act 1947. Once listed, severe restrictions are imposed on the modifications allowed to a building's structure or its fittings. In England, the authority for listing under the Planning (Listed Buildings and Conservation Areas) Act 1990 rests with Historic England, a non-departmental public body sponsored by the Department for Digital, Culture, Media and Sport; local authorities have a responsibility to regulate and enforce the planning regulations.

There are 80 Grade II* listed buildings in North Somerset. The oldest are Norman churches. From the Middle Ages onward there are more churches and some manor houses, such as Tyntesfield, Clevedon Court and Leigh Court, with their ancillary buildings. The list includes several village or church crosses and monuments in churchyards. More recent entries include Birnbeck Pier which was designed by Eugenius Birch and opened in 1867, and the Waterworks at Blagdon which was completed in 1905.

== Buildings ==
Name	Location	Type	Completed (Note: The date given is the date used by Historic England as significant for the initial building or that of an important part in the structure's description.)	Grid ref. (Note: The grid reference is based on the British national grid reference system, sometimes known as OSGB36, used by the Ordnance Survey.) Geo-coordinates	Entry number (Note: The "List Entry Number" is a unique number assigned to each listed building and scheduled monument by Historic England.)	Image	Ref.
Alburys	Wrington	Villa	1846	ST4685163075; 51°21′51″N 2°45′53″W	1320922	Upload Photo	
Banwell Abbey The Cloisters	Banwell	Bishops Palace	14th century	ST4002259136; 51°19′41″N 2°51′44″W	1135732	Banwell Abbey The Cloisters	
Banwell Castle, terraces and courtyard walls	Banwell	House	c. 1848	ST4057158608; 51°19′24″N 2°51′15″W	1283203	Banwell Castle, terraces and courtyard walls More images	
Barn to south west of Powdermill Farmhouse	Winford	Powder Magazine	18th century	ST5504864299; 51°22′33″N 2°38′50″W	1158144	Barn to south west of Powdermill Farmhouse	
Barn, 50 yards south east of Chelvey Court	Brockley	Barn	15th century	ST4660868323; 51°24′41″N 2°46′09″W	1129823	Upload Photo	
Barrow Court	Barrow Gurney	Country House	c. 1538	ST5143068437; 51°24′46″N 2°41′59″W	1311901	Barrow Court More images	
Birdcombe Court and Birdcombe Court Farmhouse	Wraxall And Failand	Farmhouse	14th century	ST4793071894; 51°26′37″N 2°45′02″W	1311776	Birdcombe Court and Birdcombe Court Farmhouse More images	
Birnbeck Pier	Weston-super-Mare	Pier	1867	ST3070362481; 51°21′26″N 2°59′48″W	1129718	Birnbeck Pier More images	
Butcombe Farmhouse	Butcombe	Farmhouse	15th century	ST5036260816; 51°20′39″N 2°42′51″W	1129229	Butcombe Farmhouse	
Chapel, immediately south of ower Court Farmhouse	Long Ashton	Chantry Chapel	Late 14th–early 15th century	ST5489270239; 51°25′46″N 2°39′01″W	1129041	Upload Photo	
Chelvey Court and bridge to the east and 2 outbuildings to the south west	Brockley	Manor House	1618–1660	ST4654968382; 51°24′43″N 2°46′12″W	1312236	Chelvey Court and bridge to the east and 2 outbuildings to the south west More images	
Christ Church	Clevedon	Church	1839	ST4088771459; 51°26′20″N 2°51′07″W	1129663	Christ Church More images	
Church of All Saints	Long Ashton	Anglican Church	14th century	ST5534270956; 51°26′09″N 2°38′38″W	1138021	Church of All Saints More images	
Church of All Saints	Weston-super-Mare	Church	1902	ST3204762027; 51°21′12″N 2°58′38″W	1129717	Church of All Saints More images	
Church of Holy Trinity	Cleeve	Parish Church	1840	ST4600766065; 51°23′28″N 2°46′39″W	1129095	Church of Holy Trinity More images	
Church of Saint Martin	Worle	Church	Norman	ST3530562895; 51°21′41″N 2°55′50″W	1137549	Church of Saint Martin More images	
Church of Saint Mary The Virgin	Hutton	Anglican Church	15th century	ST3524458595; 51°19′22″N 2°55′50″W	1320975	Church of Saint Mary The Virgin More images	
Church of St Andrew	Blagdon	Parish Church	15th century	ST5041258973; 51°19′40″N 2°42′47″W	1146388	Church of St Andrew More images	
Church of St George	Easton-In-Gordano	Anglican Church	14th and 15th century	ST5142575746; 51°28′43″N 2°42′03″W	1129826	Church of St George More images	
Church of St John	Clevedon	Church	1875–1878	ST4066471209; 51°26′12″N 2°51′18″W	1312770	Church of St John More images	
Church of St John The Evangelist	Kenn	Parish Church	Norman	ST4159368975; 51°25′00″N 2°50′29″W	1136680	Church of St John The Evangelist More images	
Church of St Mary and St Edward	Barrow Gurney	Parish Church	12th century	ST5146568449; 51°24′47″N 2°41′57″W	1311925	Church of St Mary and St Edward More images	
Church of St Mary and St Peter	Winford	Parish Church	15th century	ST5430665014; 51°22′56″N 2°39′29″W	1320916	Church of St Mary and St Peter More images	
Church of St Michael and All Angels	Butcombe	Parish Church	15th century	ST5153861873; 51°21′14″N 2°41′50″W	1129189	Church of St Michael and All Angels More images	
Church of St Michael and All Angels	Flax Bourton	Anglican Church	12th century	ST5065569376; 51°25′16″N 2°42′40″W	1129835	Church of St Michael and All Angels More images	
Church of St Nicholas	Brockley	Anglican Church	12th century	ST4658666979; 51°23′58″N 2°46′09″W	1137608	Church of St Nicholas More images	
Churchyard cross	Butcombe	Cross	15th century	ST5154061855; 51°21′13″N 2°41′50″W	1129190	Churchyard cross More images	
Churchyard Cross, in the churchyard and to the south of All Saints' Church	Wraxall	Cross	15th century	ST4902371945; 51°26′39″N 2°44′06″W	1320988	Upload Photo	
Coachhouse at Banwell Castle	Banwell	Granary	c. 1848	ST4011658669; 51°19′26″N 2°51′39″W	1129781	Upload Photo	
Court Farmhouse	Winford	Farmhouse	1593	ST5428664957; 51°22′55″N 2°39′30″W	1129214	Court Farmhouse More images	
Court House Farmhouse	Portishead	Farmhouse	Late Medieval	ST4666375972; 51°28′49″N 2°46′10″W	1220237	Upload Photo	
Crenellated wall and circular tower running from north-east corner of Clevedon Court	Clevedon	Kitchen	13th century	ST4227271612; 51°26′26″N 2°49′55″W	1129699	Crenellated wall and circular tower running from north-east corner of Clevedon Court	
East and west corner gazebos and linking north boundary wall of formal garden at Barrow Court	Barrow Gurney	Balustrade	c. 1890	ST5155068499; 51°24′48″N 2°41′53″W	1129169	East and west corner gazebos and linking north boundary wall of formal garden at Barrow Court More images	
East and west courts and linking south boundary wall of formal garden at Barrow Court	Barrow Gurney	Boundary Wall	c. 1890	ST5139268524; 51°24′49″N 2°42′01″W	1320932	Upload Photo	
Farmhouse range adjoining Priory	Kewstoke	Farmhouse	16th century	ST3433966170; 51°23′27″N 2°56′42″W	1129766	Farmhouse range adjoining Priory More images	
Friends Meeting House	Yatton	House	17th century	ST4525866288; 51°23′35″N 2°47′17″W	1320963	Upload Photo	
Gatcombe Court	Long Ashton	Manor House	Late 14th–15th century	ST5254769859; 51°25′33″N 2°41′02″W	1137925	Gatcombe Court More images	
Gatehouse, stables and flanking walls at Banwell Castle	Banwell	Gate	c. 1848	ST4014458650; 51°19′26″N 2°51′37″W	1320658	Upload Photo	
Gatepiers, gates and series of 12 pillars forming west boundary wall of garden at Barrow Court	Flax Bourton	Gate	c. 1890	ST5138668560; 51°24′50″N 2°42′02″W	1129171	Gatepiers, gates and series of 12 pillars forming west boundary wall of garden at Barrow Court	
Holy Trinity Church	Abbots Leigh	Anglican Church	15th century	ST5444274018; 51°27′48″N 2°39′26″W	1312353	Holy Trinity Church More images	
Holy Trinity Church	Weston-super-Mare	Church	1861	ST3124062312; 51°21′21″N 2°59′20″W	1137827	Holy Trinity Church More images	
Home Farm Buildings, Tyntesfield	Wraxall	Dairy	1881	ST5016471711; 51°26′32″N 2°43′06″W	1061341	Home Farm Buildings, Tyntesfield More images	
Hutton Court	Hutton	Manor House	Late 15th–20th century	ST3529358588; 51°19′22″N 2°55′48″W	1320991	Hutton Court More images	
Lake Farmhouse	Kenn	Farmhouse	c. 1600	ST4056569354; 51°25′12″N 2°51′22″W	1136606	Upload Photo	
Leigh Court	Abbots Leigh	Country House	1814	ST5431674724; 51°28′11″N 2°39′33″W	1000407	Leigh Court More images	
Lily pond and 2 ornamental pedestals with urns each 20 metres either side of pond in rose garden at Barrow Court	Barrow Gurney	Column	c. 1890	ST5142468493; 51°24′48″N 2°42′00″W	1129172	Upload Photo	
Medieval Cross 5 yards from south porch in St Peter's churchyard	Portishead	Cross	Late medieval	ST4662476000; 51°28′50″N 2°46′12″W	1291083	Upload Photo	
Monument to Anna Whiting, in the churchyard and to south of All Saints' Church	Long Ashton	Chest Tomb	1700	ST5535870946; 51°26′09″N 2°38′37″W	1129848	Upload Photo	
Monument to Elizabeth Phelps, in the churchyard to south of All Saints' Church	Long Ashton	Chest Tomb	1698 or 1699	ST5535870939; 51°26′08″N 2°38′37″W	1311995	Upload Photo	
Monument to George Whiting, in the churchyard to south of All Saints' Church	Long Ashton	Chest Tomb	1709	ST5535770945; 51°26′09″N 2°38′37″W	1320651	Upload Photo	
Monument to John and Alice Smith, in the churchyard to west of All Saints' Church	Long Ashton	Chest Tomb	1591	ST5532470959; 51°26′09″N 2°38′39″W	1129026	Upload Photo	
Monument to Robert Whiting, 1662, in the churchyard to south of All Saints' Church	Long Ashton	Chest Tomb	1662	ST5535770949; 51°26′09″N 2°38′37″W	1129847	Upload Photo	
Monument to Robert Whiting, 1679, in the churchyard to south of All Saints' Church	Long Ashton	Chest Tomb	1679	ST5535770948; 51°26′09″N 2°38′37″W	1138107	Upload Photo	
Monument to Robert Whiting, 1693, in the churchyard to south of All Saints' Church	Long Ashton	Chest Tomb	1693	ST5535970945; 51°26′09″N 2°38′37″W	1138115	Upload Photo	
Newtons	Kewstoke	Farmhouse	17th century	ST3515463614; 51°22′04″N 2°55′58″W	1320690	Newtons More images	
No 2 Former Hannah More Infants School	Nailsea	Barn	Late 15th or early 16th century	ST4657569901; 51°25′32″N 2°46′11″W	1129115	Upload Photo	
Old Church of St Nicholas	Uphill	Church	Norman	ST3161558373; 51°19′13″N 2°58′58″W	1129743	Old Church of St Nicholas More images	
Orangery, Tyntesfield	Wraxall	Orangery	1897	ST5066271155; 51°26′14″N 2°42′40″W	1061355	Orangery, Tyntesfield More images	
Parish Church of St Andrew	Loxton	Parish Church	11th century	ST3762455824; 51°17′53″N 2°53′46″W	1313078	Parish Church of St Andrew More images	
Parish Church of St Augustine	Locking	Parish Church	Late 14th or early 15th century	ST3635459637; 51°19′56″N 2°54′54″W	1135810	Parish Church of St Augustine More images	
Parish Church of St Lawrence	Wick St. Lawrence	Church	15th century	ST3663665440; 51°23′04″N 2°54′43″W	1129773	Parish Church of St Lawrence More images	
Powdermill Farmhouse	Winford	House	Later 17th century	ST5507764301; 51°22′34″N 2°38′49″W	1158132	Powdermill Farmhouse More images	
Sores Court	Backwell	Farmhouse	Mid-late 17th century	ST4860367758; 51°24′23″N 2°44′25″W	1312284	Sores Court More images	
St Brandon's School for Girls	Clevedon	House	1850	ST4005171122; 51°26′09″N 2°51′50″W	1129704	St Brandon's School for Girls More images	
Steps, walls, ornamental vases and sundial forming junction between rose garden and north lawn at Barrow Court	Barrow Gurney	Wall	c. 1890	ST5143268508; 51°24′49″N 2°41′59″W	1129173	Upload Photo	
Temple, exedra and linking east boundary wall of formal garden at Barrow Court	Barrow Gurney	Balustrade	c. 1890	ST5154368455; 51°24′47″N 2°41′53″W	1129170	Upload Photo	
Terrace and dairy at Banwell Castle	Banwell	Dairy	c. 1848	ST4018558647; 51°19′26″N 2°51′35″W	1135437	Upload Photo	
The Bell House	Weston-super-Mare	House	Late medieval	ST3553462982; 51°21′44″N 2°55′38″W	1129726	The Bell House	
The Court	Tickenham	Farmhouse	c. 1400	ST4575271493; 51°26′23″N 2°46′55″W	1312529	The Court More images	
The Grange	Portishead	House	19th century	ST4666875571; 51°28′36″N 2°46′10″W	1220300	Upload Photo	
The Parsonage	Winford	House	c. 1700	ST5297664293; 51°22′33″N 2°40′37″W	1129217	The Parsonage More images	
Tithe Barn at Barrow Court	Barrow Gurney	House	14th century	ST5139768452; 51°24′47″N 2°42′01″W	1129208	Tithe Barn at Barrow Court More images	
Unidentified Chest Tomb, 18 metres east of east end of All Saints Church	Kingston Seymour	Chest Tomb	15th or 16th century	ST4011266859; 51°23′51″N 2°51′44″W	1135989	Upload Photo	
Uphill Manor	Weston-super-Mare	House	c. 1805	ST3190959009; 51°19′34″N 2°58′43″W	1137993	Upload Photo	
Urchinwood Manor	Congresbury	Manor House	1620	ST4473563556; 51°22′06″N 2°47′43″W	1129209	Upload Photo	
Village Cross	Congresbury	Steps	15th century	ST4373363816; 51°22′14″N 2°48′35″W	1158002	Village Cross More images	
Village Cross 5 yards east of Banksea Cottages	Wick St. Lawrence	Village Cross	15th century	ST3660565388; 51°23′02″N 2°54′45″W	1129775	Village Cross 5 yards east of Banksea Cottages More images	
Waterworks at Blagdon: Pumping Station with Receiving Tanks	Blagdon	Pumping station	1905	ST5035160018; 51°20′13″N 2°42′51″W	1320936	Waterworks at Blagdon: Pumping Station with Receiving Tanks More images	
West garden walls with towers at Banwell Castle	Banwell	Tower	c. 1848	ST4010258658; 51°19′26″N 2°51′40″W	1129782	Upload Photo	
Woodspring District Council Offices (Housing Services Department)	Clevedon	House	Mid 19th century	ST4098571484; 51°26′21″N 2°51′02″W	1312828	Upload Photo	

== See also ==
- Grade II* listed buildings in Somerset
- Grade I listed buildings in North Somerset
