= Elliott O'Donnell =

English author (1872–1965)

Elliott O'Donnell in 1930.

Elliott O'Donnell (27 February 1872 – 8 May 1965) was an English author known primarily for his books about ghosts.

== Early life and education ==
He was born in England in Clifton (near Bristol), the son of Irishman Reverend Henry O'Donnell (1827–1873) and Englishwoman Elizabeth Mousley (née Harrison); he had three older siblings, Henry O'Donnell, Helena O'Donnell and Petronella O'Donnell. After the birth of his fourth child the Rev. Henry O'Donnell travelled to Abyssinia while awaiting preferment to a new parish. Here he was said to have been attacked by a gang and robbed and murdered. Elliott O'Donnell claimed descent from Irish chieftains of ancient times, including Niall of the Nine Hostages and Red Hugh, who fought the English in the sixteenth century. O'Donnell was educated at Clifton College in Bristol, England, and later at Queen's Service Academy, Dublin, Ireland.

O'Donnell claimed to have seen a ghost in his bedroom when he was five years old, describing it as an elemental figure covered with "fulsome-looking yellow spots". As a student in Dublin he claimed to have seen an "odd-looking, yellow hand" emerge from behind a curtain in a friend's lodgings, which revealed itself to be an entity made from "vibrating, luminous matter" which shortly vanished. He reported encountering a similar "yellow phantasm" a decade later in Plymouth.

== Career ==
Intending originally to take entry exams at the Royal Military Academy at Sandhurst in order to join the Royal Irish Constabulary (RIC), he travelled in the United States instead, working on a cattle range in Oregon and becoming a policeman during the Chicago Railway Strike of 1894. Returning to England on the SS Elbe, he worked there as a schoolmaster and trained for theatre in London at the Henry Neville Studio, Oxford Street. In 1905 he married Ada O'Donnell (1870–1937) and served in the British army in World War I, later acting on stage and in movies.

His first book, written in his spare time, was a psychic thriller titled For Satan's Sake (1904). From this time onward, he worked as a writer. He wrote several popular novels, including an occult fantasy, The Sorcery Club (1912) but specialised in what were claimed as true stories of ghosts and hauntings. These were immensely popular, but his flamboyant style and amazing stories suggest that he combined fact with fiction. O'Donnell wrote for numerous magazines, including Hutchinson Story Magazine, The Novel Magazine, The Idler, Weekly Tale-Teller, Hutchinson's Mystery-Story Magazine, Pearson's Magazine, Lilliput and Weird Tales (the last during 1930).

As he became known as an authority on supernatural affairs, he was asked to solve alleged ghost problems. He also lectured and broadcast (radio and television) about paranormal matters in Britain and the United States. In addition to his more than 50 books, he wrote scores of articles and stories for national newspapers and magazines. He claimed "I have investigated, sometimes alone, and sometimes with other people and the press, many cases of reputed hauntings. I believe in ghosts but am not a spiritualist."

Many of O'Donnell's books possess autobiographical sections in which he reveals a desperate struggle to escape early poverty (such as the plight of the three protagonists at the beginning of 'The Sorcery Club'). These revelations, coupled with both his employment of actors such as C. Aubrey Smith to help stage hauntings, and the fact that he did not leave any notes relating to his studies after his death, suggest that he embellished or perhaps even invented many of his supposed experiences. He never worked with the Society for Psychical Research. However, O'Donnell once spent a night at St Nicholas Church, Brockley Combe with Everard Feilding, an investigator from the Society for Psychical Research.

== Death ==
Elliott O'Donnell died aged 93 at the Grosvenor Nursing Home at Clevedon in North Somerset on 8 May 1965. In his will he left £2,579.

== Bibliography ==
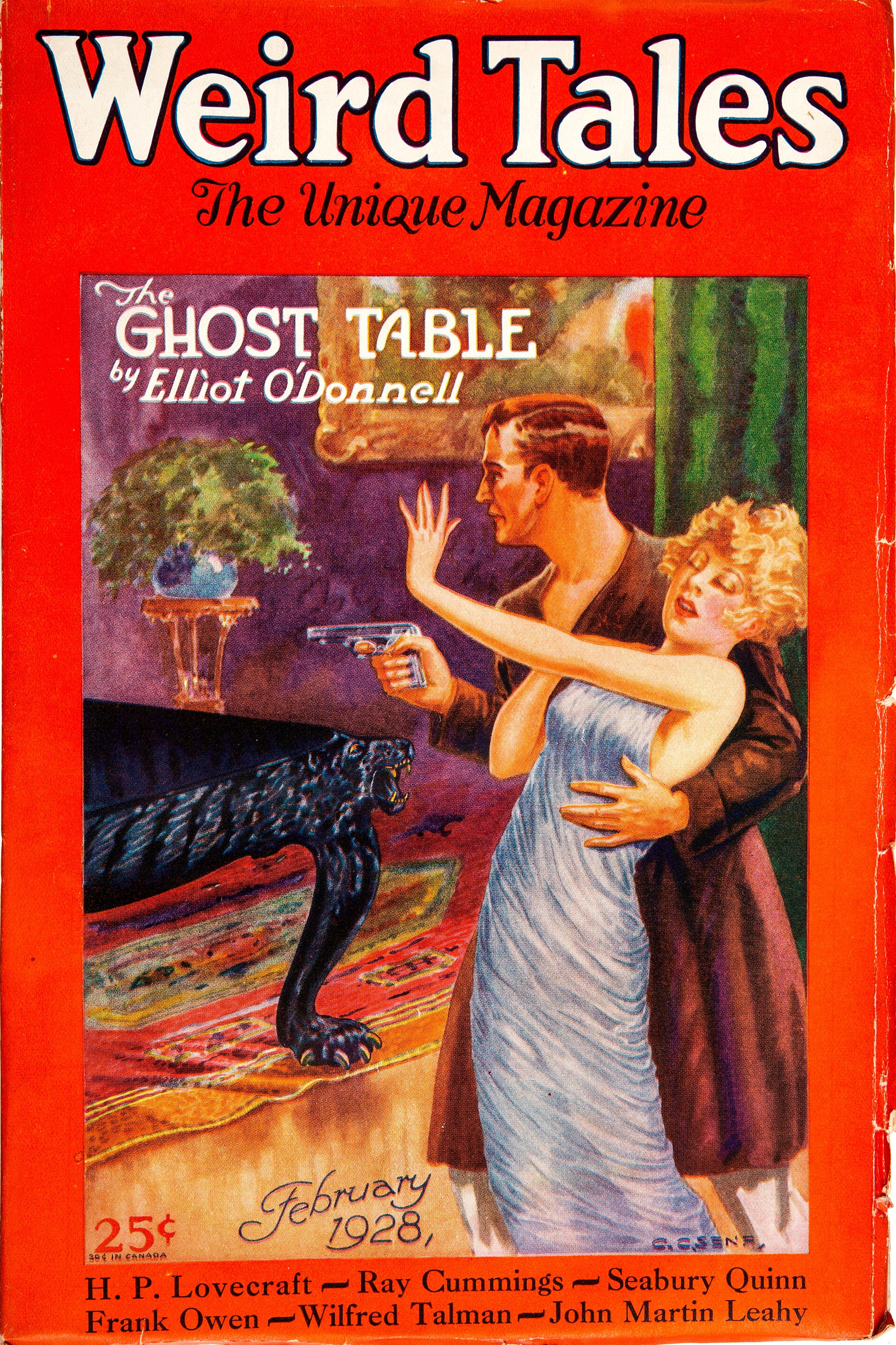
O'Donnell's story The Ghost Table was the cover story for the February 1928 Weird Tales.

=== Novels ===
- For Satan's Sake (1904)
- The Unknown Depths (1905)

=== Non-fiction ===
- Some Haunted Houses (1908)
- Haunted Houses of London (1909)
- Reminiscences of Mrs E. M. Ward (1910)
- Byways of Ghostland (1911)
- The Meaning of Dreams (1911)
- Scottish Ghost Stories (1912)
- The Sorcery Club (1912)
- Werwolves (1912)
- Animal Ghosts (1913)
- Ghostly Phenomena (1913)
- Haunted Highways and Byways (1914)
- The Irish Abroad (1915)
- Twenty Years' Experience as a Ghost Hunter (1916)
- The Haunted Man (1917)
- Spiritualism Explained (1917)
- Fortunes (1918)
- Haunted Places in England (1919)
- Menace of Spiritualism (1920)
- More Haunted Houses of London (1920)
- Ghosts, Helpful and Harmful (1924)
- The Banshee (1907)
- Strange Sea Mysteries (1926)
- Strange Disappearances (1927)
- Confessions of a Ghost Hunter (1928)
- Women Bluebeards (1928)
- Great Thames Mysteries (1929)
- Famous Curses (1929)
- Fatal Kisses (1929)
- The Boys' Book of Sea Mysteries (1930), Dodd, Mead & Company
- Rooms of Mystery (1931), London: Philip Allan & Co. Ltd.
- Ghosts of London (1932)
- The Devil in the Pulpit (1932)
- Family Ghosts (1934)
- Strange Cults & Secret Societies of Modern London (1934)
- Spookerisms: Twenty-five Weird Happenings (1936)
- Haunted Churches (1939)
- Ghosts with a Purpose (1952)
- Dead Riders (1953)
- Dangerous Ghosts (1954)
- Phantoms of the Night (1956)
- Haunted Waters, and Trees of Ghostly Dread (1958)
- The Unlucky Theatre
- Haunted Britain
