= John Still =

Church of England bishop

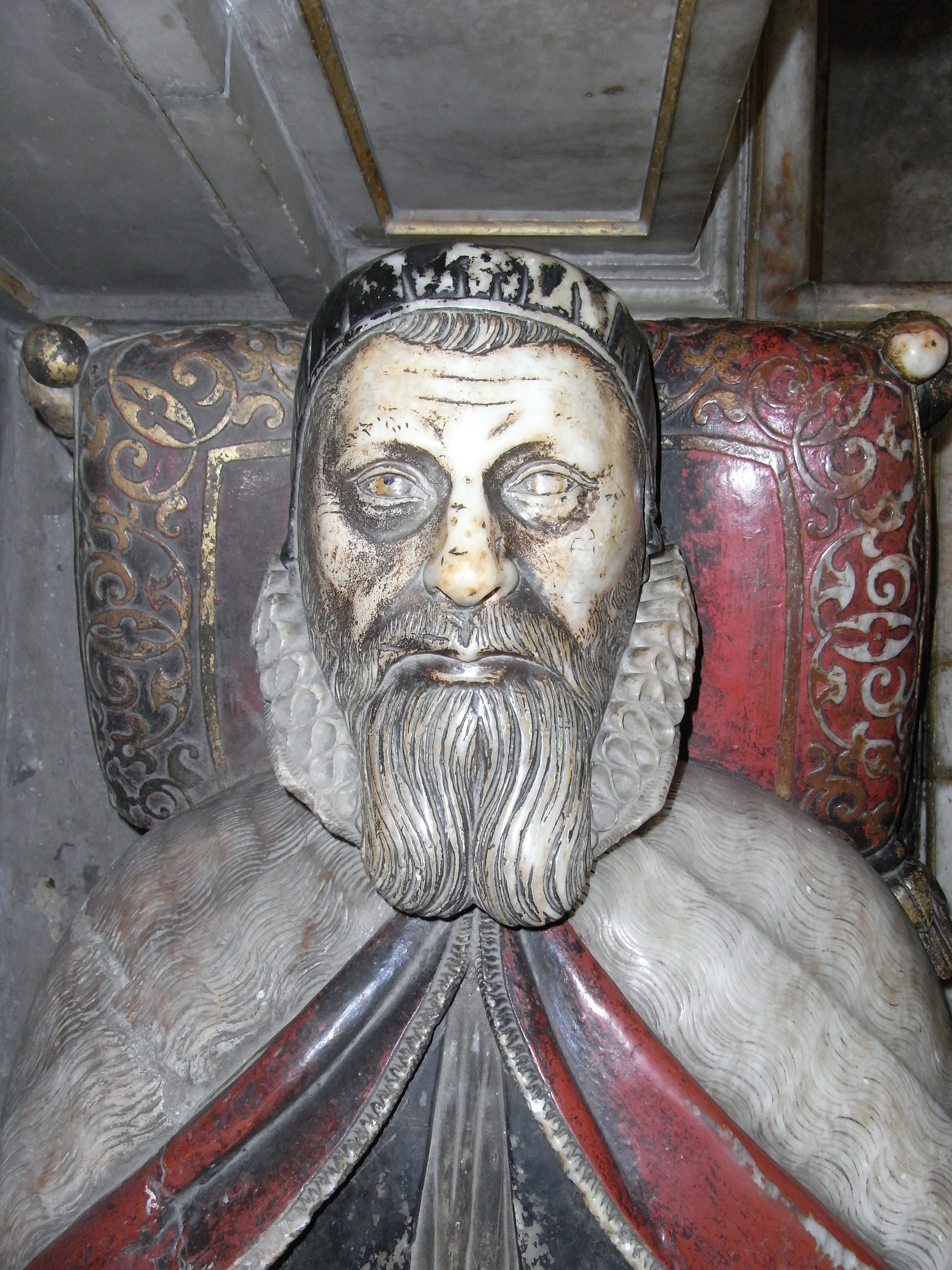
- Bishop John Still, effigy in Wells Cathedral
- Title: Bishop of Bath and Wells

Personal life
- Born: c. 1543 Grantham, Lincolnshire
- Died: 1607/08 (aged 64) Wells, Somerset
- Resting place: Wells Cathedral

Religious life
- Religion: Church of England

Senior posting
- Based in: England
- Period in office: 1593–1608

John Still (c. 1543 – 26 February 1607/1608) was Master of two Cambridge colleges and then, from 1593, Bishop of Bath and Wells. He enjoyed considerable fame as an English preacher and disputant. He was formerly reputed to be the author of an early English comedy drama, Gammer Gurton's Needle.

== Career ==
Still was born 1543 in Grantham, Lincolnshire. After finishing school at The King's School, Grantham, he became a student at Christ's College, Cambridge, where he gained a BA in 1562, a MA in 1565, and a DD doctorate in 1575. In 1561 he became a fellow of his college and took holy orders.

Still was appointed in 1570 to be Lady Margaret's Professor of Divinity, and later held livings in Suffolk, where he was Archdeacon of Sudbury from 1576 to 1593, and in Yorkshire. He was then Master successively of St John's College (1574) and of Trinity College (1577). Still was Vice-Chancellor of his university in 1575/1576 and again in 1592/1593. He was raised to the bishopric of Bath and Wells in 1593. In 1604 he bought the manor of Hutton, Somerset, east of Wells and to the west of the Mendip Hills, with its residence, Hutton Court.

John Still died on 26 February 1608, leaving a large fortune from lead mines discovered in the Mendips. There is a fine monument to him in the north transept of Wells Cathedral, erected by his son Nathaniel.

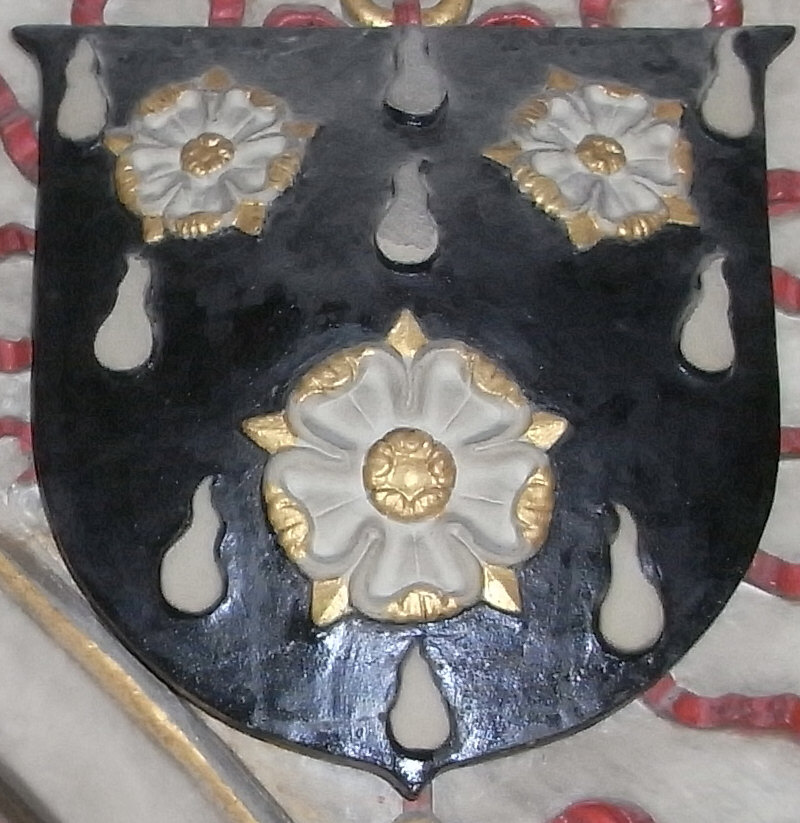
Arms of Still: Sable gutté d'eau argent, 3 roses of the last seeded or barbed vert. These arms were granted by Sir William Dethick, Garter King of Arms, on 10 April 1593, on his elevation to the bishopric. The thorns of the roses in the arms, here depicted above the Bishop's tomb in Wells Cathedral, are painted not "vert" (green) but "or" (gold). Jewers noted in his 19th-century book that the monument had been newly painted

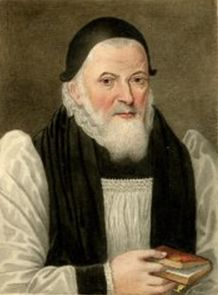
Bishop John Still by Silvester Harding, painted 1760–1809, possibly copied from a now lost contemporary portrait (British Museum Gg 1.425)

== Family ==
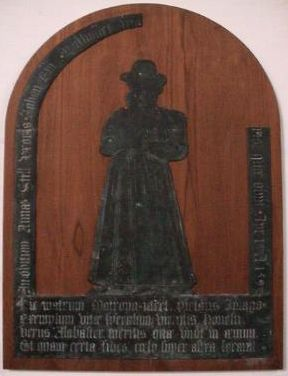
Monumental brass of Ann Alabaster (died 1592), first wife of John Still and daughter of Thomas Alabaster (died 1592), cloth merchant of Hadleigh (St Mary's Church, Hadleigh, Suffolk)

John Still was married twice:

- First to Anne Alabaster or Arblaster (died 1592), daughter of Thomas Alabaster, a cloth merchant of Hadleigh, Suffolk. A monumental brass in her memory remains in St Mary's Church, Hadleigh. Her brother John Alabaster was twice mayor of Hadleigh. They had the following children:
  - John (died young 1577–1581), buried at Hadleigh
  - Nathaniel (1579–1626), baptised at Hadleigh in 1579, died 1626 at Hutton, Somerset. Nathaniel married Jane Whitmore (died 1639, buried at Bath Abbey), a daughter of William Whitmore (died 1593), a haberdasher of Balmes Manor, Hackney and of Apley Hall, Shropshire. Jane's nephew was Sir Thomas Whitmore, 1st Baronet (1612–1653). They had a son who died young, and five daughters and co-heiresses: (1) Anne, born 1613, married to John Codrington of Codrington and Didmarton, Glos., to whose family passed the manor of Hutton, (2) Jane (born 1614) married Sir James Pyle of Compton Beauchamp, Berks, (3) Elizabeth (born 1618), living in 1639, (4) a fourth daughter unnamed; (5) Mary (born c. 1620) married to John Dennis (died 1660) of Pucklechurch, Glos., Sheriff of Gloucestershire and son of Henry Dennis (died 1638), who had married as his second wife Nathaniel's widow Jane. There is an incised stone mural tablet in a baroque surround in St Mary's Church at Hutton showing Nathaniel and his wife and children kneeling in prayer.
- Secondly after 1592, to Jane Horner, daughter of Sir John Horner of Mells Manor, High Sheriff of Somerset, who had the following children:
  - John Still, buried in St James's, Shaftesbury, who married Margaret Grubham Howe, daughter of Sir George Howe, of Berwick St Leonard, Wilts, and sister of Sir George Howe, 1st Baronet (died 1676), MP for Hindon and of Berwick St Leonard, Wilts.
  - Thomas Still (died 1631) of Somerton, Somerset, buried at St James's, Shaftesbury, who married Bridget, daughter of Gawen Champernoune Esq. of Dartington, Devon, by Lady Gabrielle Roberta Montgomery, daughter of Gabriel de Lorges, Count of Montgomery (died 1574), a French Huguenot.

== Monument ==
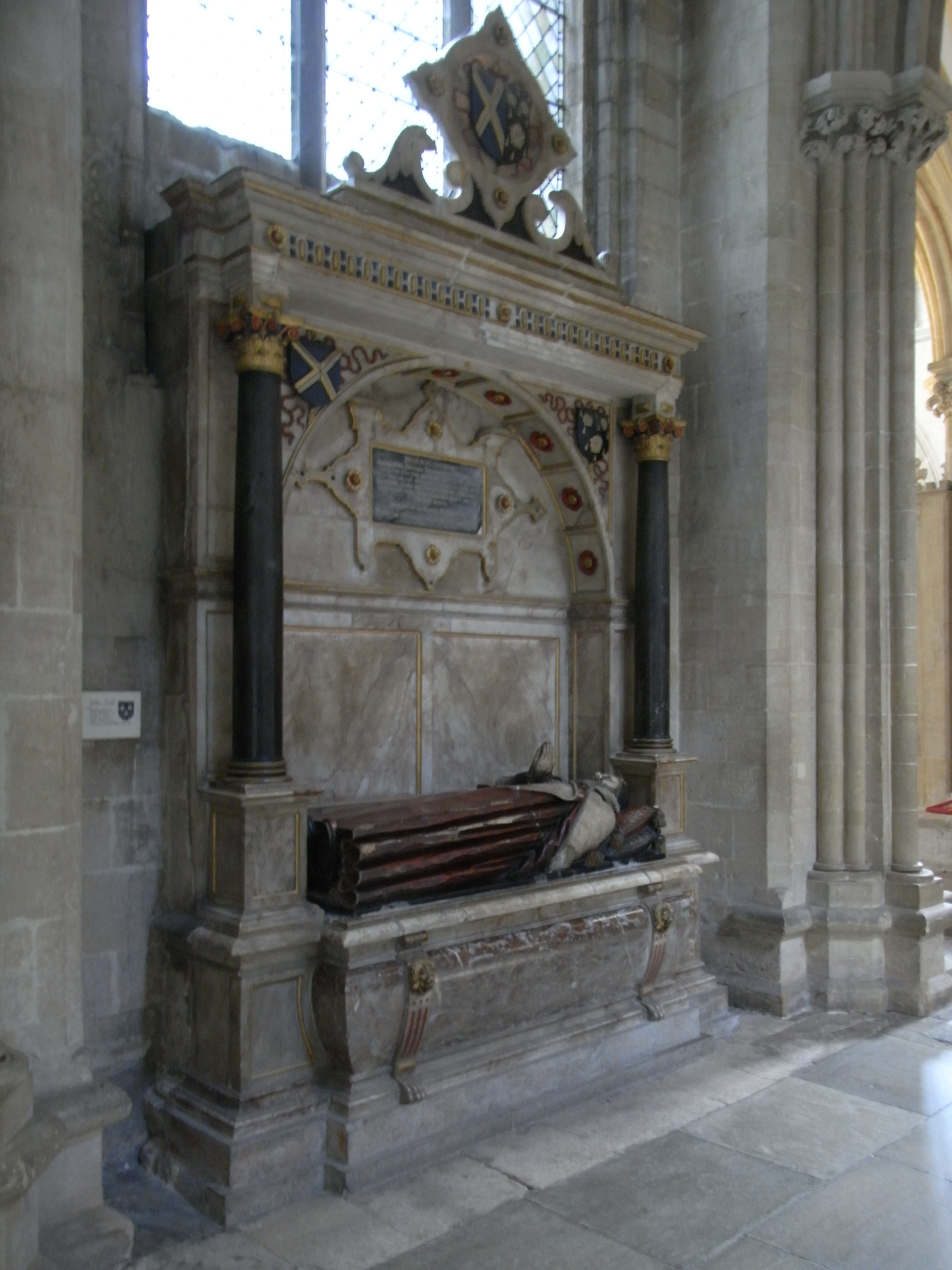
Monument to Bishop John Still in Wells Cathedral

Wells Cathedral has a large canopied tomb with a recumbent effigy of the Bishop, situated against the east wall of the chapel between the north aisle and the Chapter House. It was repainted in the 19th century. It bears a Latin inscription:

Memoriae sacrum Joanni Still Episcopo Bathoniensi et Wellensi, Sacras Theologia Doctori Acerrimo Christianae Veritatis propugnatori non minus vitas integritate quam veria doctrina claro qui cum Domino diu vigilasset in Christo spe certa resurgendi obdormivit die XXVI Februarii mdcvii Vixit annos LXIIII sedit episcopus XVI Nathaniel Still filius primogenitus optimo patri maerens pietatis ergo posuit

("Sacred to the memory of John Still, Bishop of Bath and Wells, Doctor of Theology, keenest warrior for Christian Virtue famed no less in integrity of life than for True Doctrine, who, when he had long kept vigil with the Lord, went to sleep in Christ on the 26th day of February 1607 in the certain hope of rising again. He lived for 64 years, sat as Bishop for 16. Nathaniel Still first-born son mourning the best father thus placed it of piety")

Above it are three escutcheons, left to right: Azure, a saltire per saltire and per cross counter changed argent and or (See of Wells); the same, impaling Still; Still, alone.

== Monument to son ==
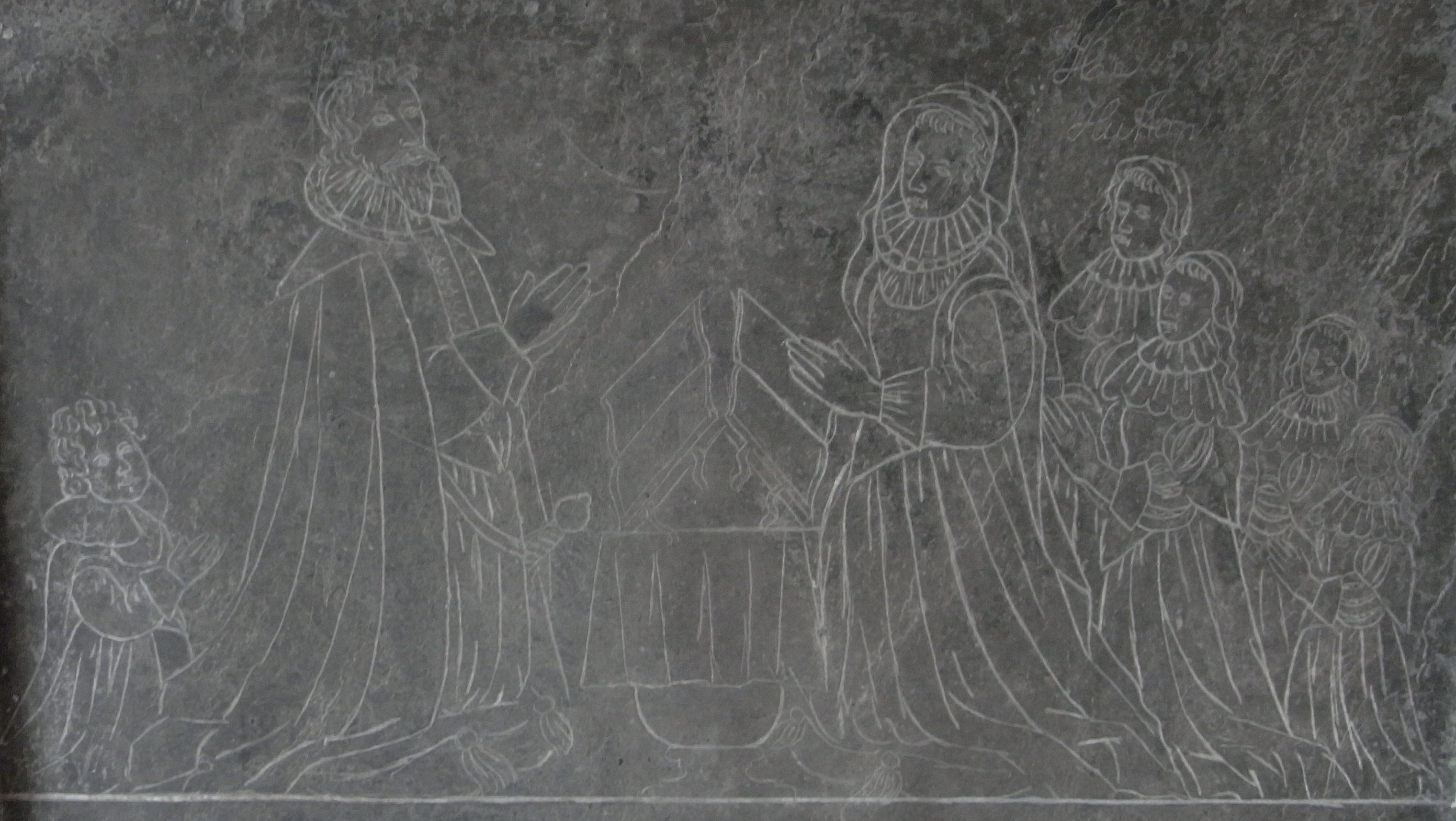
Etched stone mural monument to Nathaniel Still (d. 1626) in Hutton Church, Somerset

There exists also a stone memorial to Nathaniel Still (died 1626), son of Bishop Still. Nathaniel kneels at prayer to the left, in front of his own son, who predeceased him. Kneeling opposite is his wife, Jane Whitmore, in front of their daughters. Below is a text alluding to the Bishop, who "first raised the name" (of Still):

"In memory of Nathanill Still of this parrish Esq., who dyed the second day of February Anno Domini 1626. Not that he needeth monuments of stone for his well-gotten fame to rest uppon but this was reard to testifie that hee lives in theire loves ye yet surviving for unto vertu who first raised his name hee left the preservation of the same and to posterity remaine it shall when brass and marble monuments shall fall"

== Authorship of Gammer Gurton's Needle ==
Gammer Gurton's Needle is the second earliest extant English comedy, properly so called. Still, whose reputation as a serious churchman cannot easily be reconciled with the buffoonery in A Ryght Pithy, Pleasaunt and merie Comedie: Intytuled Gammer Gurtons Nedle, was first credited with its authorship by Isaac Reed in his 1782 edition of Biographia dramatica. The title-page of the piece, which was printed by Thomas Colwell in 1575, states that it was played not long before at Christ's College, Cambridge, and was "made by Mr S. Mr of Art." A play was acted at Christmas 1567, and Still was identified as being the only MA on the register at that time whose name began with S.

There are reasons to suppose, however, that the play had been in Colwell's hands some time before it was printed, and it may well be identical with the Dyccon of Bedlam for which he took out a licence in 1562–1563, "Diccon the Bedlem" being first in the dramatis personae of Gammer Gurton. The accounts of Christ's College for 1559–1560 include the entry, "Spent at Mr Stevenson's plaie, 5s."

William Stevenson was born at Hunwick, Durham, matriculated in 1546, took his MA degree in 1553, and became BD in 1560. He was a fellow of Christ's College in 1559–1561 and can perhaps to be identified with a William Stevenson who was a fellow in 1551–1554. If so, there is reason to believe that the composition of Gammer Gurton's Needle should be ascribed to the earlier period. Stevenson was made prebendary of Durham in 1560–1561 and died in 1575.

Contemporary Puritan writers in the Marprelate tracts allude to Dr John Bridges, Dean of Salisbury, author of A Defence of the Government of the Church of England, as the reputed author of Gammer Gurton's Needle, but he obviously could not be properly described as "Mr. S". Dr Bridges took his MA degree at Pembroke College, Cambridge, in 1560. The wit and periodic coarseness of his acknowledged work makes it reasonable to suppose he may have been a coadjutor of the author.

In the light of the authorship discussion, Gammer Gurton's Needle is thought to date from about 1553. Though less overt in its use of Latin comedic conventions than its contemporary Ralph Roister Doister, several scholars have noted the play's parodic treatment of Terentian comedy. The plot centres on the loss of a needle belonging to Gammer Gurton. This is eventually found when her servant, Hodge, is slapped on the buttocks by the trickster Diccon and discovers it in the seat of his breeches.

== Sources ==
- The Master of Trinity at Trinity College, Cambridge
- Jewers, Arthur John. Wells Cathedral: Its Monumental Inscriptions and Heraldry, together with the Heraldry of the Palace, Deanery, and Vicar's Close, with Annotations from Wills, Registers, etc., and Illustrations of Arms, pp. 146–150, Bishop Still

Academic offices
Preceded by Nicholas Shepherd	Master of St John's College, Cambridge; 1574–1577	Succeeded by Richard Howland
Preceded by John Whitgift	Master of Trinity College, Cambridge; 1577–1593	Succeeded by Thomas Nevile
Church of England titles
Preceded by Thomas Godwin	Bishop of Bath and Wells; 1593–1608	Succeeded by James Montague
