= Elborough =

Elborough may refer to:

- Elborough, Somerset, a village in England
  - Elborough Hill
- Travis Elborough, a British author
