= Brockley Hall Stables =

Biological Site of Special Scientific Interest near Brockley, North Somerset, England

- Site of Special Scientific Interest
- Location within Somerset
- Location of Brockley Hall Stables.
- Area of search: Avon
- Grid reference: ST471669
- Coordinates: 51.39865°N 2.76179°W
- Interest: Biological
- Area: 0.16 acres (0.00065 km^{2}; 0.00025 sq mi)
- Notification date: 1987

Brockley Hall Stables (grid reference ST471669) is a 0.065 hectare biological Site of Special Scientific Interest near the village of Brockley, North Somerset, England notified in 1987.

== Biological Interest ==
The SSSI designation applies to part of the former stable block of Brockley Hall, the roofspace of which hosts a large breeding colony of greater horseshoe bats during summer.

== Sources ==
- English Nature citation sheet for the site (accessed 9 July 2006)
