= Axbridge Rural District =

Former local government area in the UK

- Area
  - 1911: 93,645 acres (378.97 km^{2})
  - 1961: 90,551 acres (366.45 km^{2})
- Population
  - 1911: 23,063
  - 1961: 30,796
- History
  - Created: 1894
  - Abolished: 1974
- Status: Rural district
- Government: Axbridge Rural District Council
  - HQ: Axbridge

Axbridge was a rural district in Somerset, England, from 1894 to 1974. It was named after the town of Axbridge.

It was created in 1894 under the Local Government Act 1894 as a successor to the Axbridge rural sanitary district.

In 1974, it was abolished under the Local Government Act 1972. The area was split between three districts. The civil parishes of Banwell, Bleadon, Butcombe, Churchill, Congresbury, Hutton, Kewstoke, Locking, Puxton, Wick St. Lawrence, Winscombe and Wrington, and part of the parishes of Blagdon, Burrington and Loxton became part of the Woodspring district in the new county of Avon, with the remainder of the district becoming part of the Sedgemoor district in Somerset.
