= William Stevenson (poet) =

William Stevenson (1530–1575) was an English clergyman and presumed playwright of the early English language comedy Gammer Gurton's Needle.

Born in Durham, England, he studied at Christ's College, Cambridge, where he received his Bachelor of Arts degree in 1553, his Master of Arts degree in 1560 and his Bachelor of Divinity degree, also in 1560. Account books at Christ's College list him in 1550–1553 and again in 1559–1560 as involved in putting on plays, though they do not mention Gammer Gurton's Needle explicitly. He became a prebend at Durham Cathedral in 1561.

Famous quotation: "I am so wrapped, and throughly lapped of jolly good ale and old!" Gammer Gurton’s Needle: Drinking Song (attributed to Stevenson and to Still).
