= Chelvey Court =

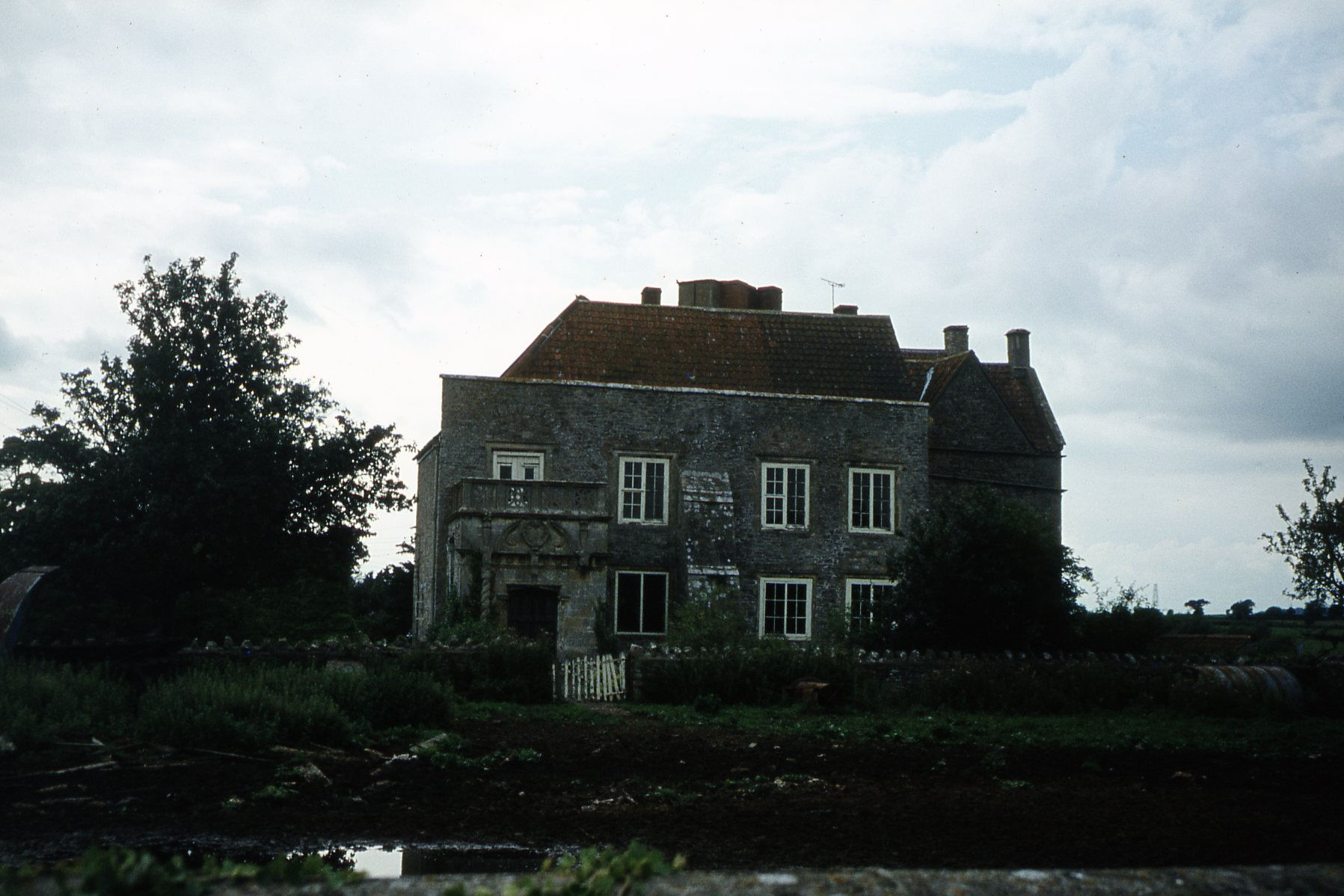

- Location within Somerset
- 51°24′43″N 2°46′12″W
- Location: Chelvey, Brockley, Somerset, England

History
- Built: 1618 - 1660

Listed Building – Grade II*
- Official name: Chelvey Court
- Designated: 16 March 1984
- Reference no.: 1312236

Chelvey Court in the village of Chelvey near Brockley in the English county of Somerset was a large manor house built between 1618 and 1660 for Edward and John Tynte. It is a Grade II* listed building.

== Establishment ==
Edward Tynte, who was part of an important family in surrounding parishes and gave their name to Tyntesfield, bought the Lordship of the manor of Chelvey from John Aisshe. Edward Tynte improved the St Bridgets Church, next to the manor house, which contains the Tynte chapel. His son John reconstructed the manor house with his wife Jane Halswell, of Halswell House. Their son Sir Halswell Tynte, 1st Baronet inherited both estates and developed Halswell House, leaving Chelvey Court to fall into decline.

== Alterations ==
Significant alterations were undertaken in 1805 which included demolition of the south part of the house and addition of buttresses.

The three storey house has been divided into two separate dwellings with a further two houses on the site which were adapted from buildings previously used for agricultural purposes.

South east of the house is a large 15th-century barn, which was extended in the 19th century. This is now used by a company restoring bedsteads.
