= Long Ashton Rural District =

Rural district in Somerset, England

Coordinates: 51.43°N 2.65°W

- Area
  - 1911: 47,900 acres (194 km^{2})
  - 1961: 45,440 acres (183.9 km^{2})
- Population
  - 1911: 16,197
  - 1961: 29,325
- History
  - Created: 1894
  - Abolished: 1974
- Status: Rural district

Long Ashton was a rural district in Somerset, England, from 1894 to 1974.

It was created in 1894 under the Local Government Act 1894.

In 1974 it was abolished under the Local Government Act 1972 to become part of North Somerset.

The parishes which were part of the district included Abbots Leigh, Backwell, Blagdon, Brockley, Clapton in Gordano, Cleeve, Dundry, Easton in Gordano, Flax Bourton, Kenn, Kingston Seymour, Long Ashton, Nailsea, Portbury, North Weston, Winford, Wraxall and Failand, and Yatton.
