= Christ Church, Clevedon =

Church in Somerset, England

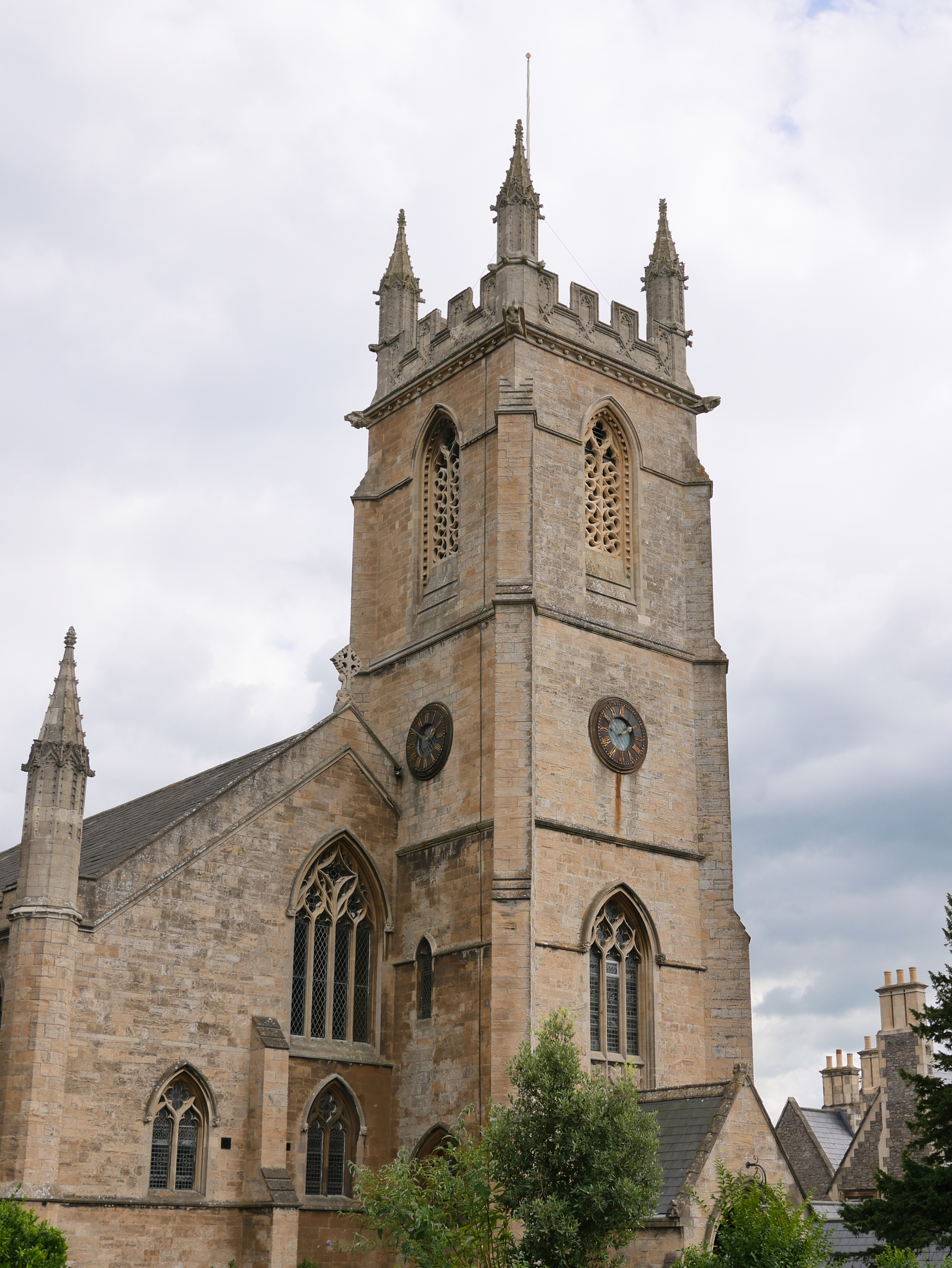

- Location within Somerset
- 51.4390°N 2.8519°W
- Location: Clevedon, Somerset, England

History
- Built: 1830s

Site notes
- Architect(s): Rickman & Hussey

Listed Building – Grade II*
- Official name: Christ Church
- Designated: 5 April 1952
- Reference no.: 1129663

Christchurch in Clevedon, within the English county of Somerset was built between 1838 and 1839 by Richard Charles Hussey and Thomas Rickman and revised by George Phillips Manners and John Elkington Gill in the 1850s. It is a Grade II* listed building.

== History ==
The construction of the church, to designs by Richard Charles Hussey and Thomas Rickman, was paid for by public subscription when the town of Clevedon was expanding rapidly. George Weare Braikenridge donated £1800 and a Flemish 14th century stained glass east window of the Tree of Jesse from his collection.

The parish of Christchurch is within the Diocese of Bath and Wells.

== Architecture ==
The limestone church has a six-bay nave, chancel and buttressed tower in the south west. The tower is topped by an embattled parapet and embellished crocketed pinnacles which were added as part of the 1850s revision by George Phillips Manners and John Elkington Gill.

== See also ==
- List of ecclesiastical parishes in the Diocese of Bath and Wells
