= Butcombe =

Village in Somerset, England

Coordinates: 51.3504°N 2.6957°W

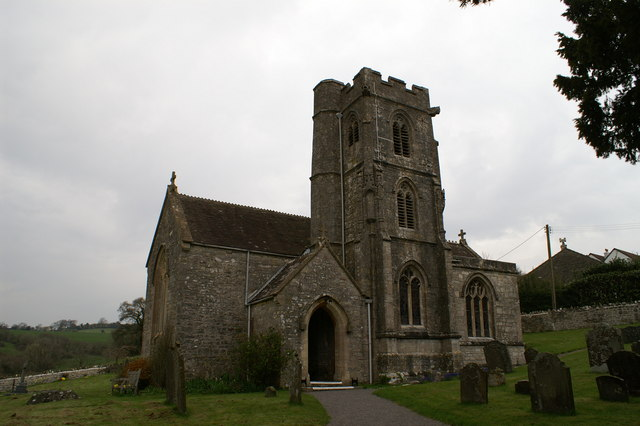
- St Michaels and All Angels Church

- Location within Somerset
- Population: 220 (2011)
- OS grid reference: ST515615
- Unitary authority: North Somerset
- Ceremonial county: Somerset
- Region: South West
- Country: England
- Sovereign state: United Kingdom
- Post town: BRISTOL
- Postcode district: BS40
- Dialling code: 01761
- Police: Avon and Somerset
- Fire: Avon
- Ambulance: South Western
- UK Parliament: North Somerset

Butcombe is a village and civil parish in Somerset, England. The village is situated just north of Blagdon Lake, in North Somerset. The parish has a population of 218 and mainly consists of family-owned farmland. It no longer has any amenities apart from a telephone kiosk and a letter box.

== History ==
The parish was part of the hundred of Hartcliffe.

The village gave its name to the Butcombe Brewery. The microbrewery was set up in 1978 by Simon Whitmore. In 2003 the business was sold and moved to an industrial estate at Wrington, to be housed in a purpose-built brewery completed in March 2005.

== Governance ==
The parish council has responsibility for local issues, including setting an annual precept (local rate) to cover the council's operating costs and producing annual accounts for public scrutiny. The parish council evaluates local planning applications and works with the local police, district council officers, and neighbourhood watch groups on matters of crime, security, and traffic. The parish council's role also includes initiating projects for the maintenance and repair of parish facilities, such as the village hall or community centre, playing fields and playgrounds, as well as consulting with the district council on the maintenance, repair, and improvement of highways, drainage, footpaths, public transport, and street cleaning. Conservation matters (including trees and listed buildings) and environmental issues are also of interest to the council.

The parish falls within the unitary authority of North Somerset which was created in 1996, as established by the Local Government Act 1992. It provides a single tier of local government with responsibility for almost all local government functions within its area including local planning and building control, local roads, council housing, environmental health, markets and fairs, refuse collection, recycling, cemeteries, crematoria, leisure services, parks, and tourism. They are also responsible for education, social services, libraries, main roads, public transport, trading standards, waste disposal and strategic planning, although fire, police and ambulance services are provided jointly with other authorities through the Avon Fire and Rescue Service, Avon and Somerset Constabulary and the Great Western Ambulance Service.

North Somerset's area covers part of the ceremonial county of Somerset but it is administered independently of the non-metropolitan county. Its administrative headquarters is in the town hall in Weston-super-Mare. Between 1 April 1974 and 1 April 1996, it was the Woodspring district of the county of Avon. Before 1974 that the parish was part of the Axbridge Rural District.

The parish is represented in the House of Commons of the Parliament of the United Kingdom as part of the North Somerset county constituency. It elects one Member of Parliament (MP) by the first past the post system of election. It was also part of the South West England constituency of the European Parliament prior to Britain leaving the European Union in January 2020.

== Landmarks ==
Butcombe Court is a late 18th-century grade II listed manor house which was built on the site of a medieval building. It is now in 3 separate ownerships. During World War II, Clifton College used Butcombe Court as a safe extension of the school, away from the bombs. The pre-preparatory school at Clifton College for younger children aged 3 to 8 is called Butcombe after the house.

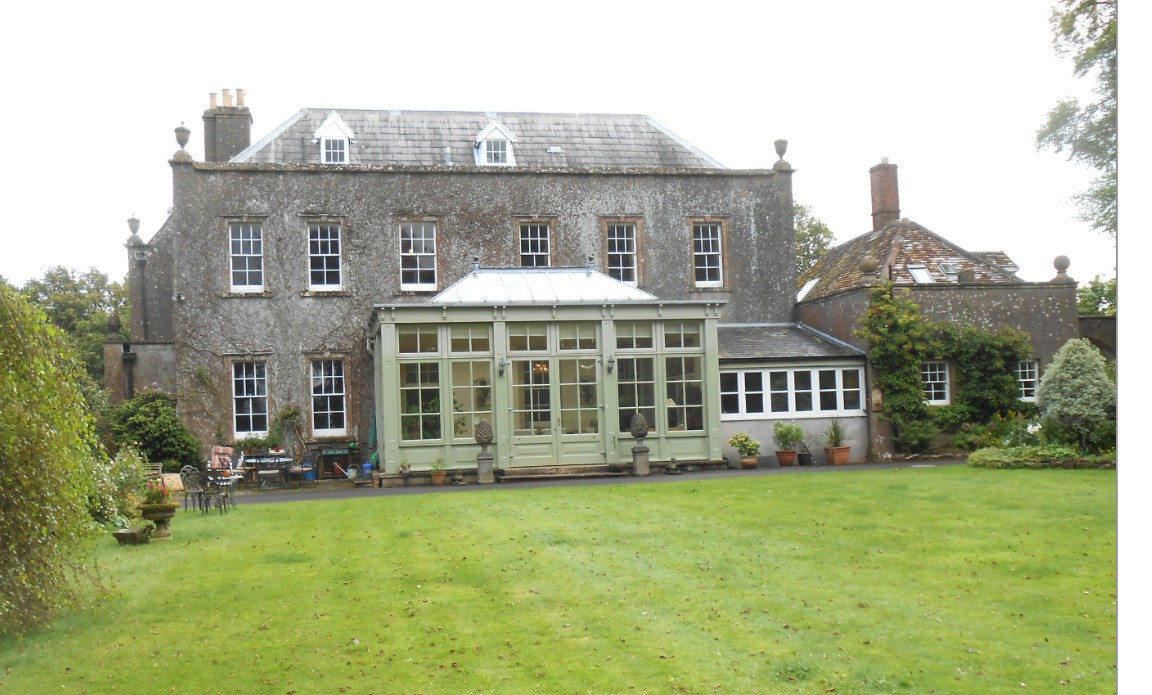
Butcombe Court

== Religious sites ==
The Church of St Michael and All Angels dates from the 15th century and is a Grade II* listed building.

== Notable people ==
- Henry Savery (1791 - 1842) a convict transported to Port Arthur, Tasmania and Australia's first novelist was born in the village.
