= Church of St Lawrence, Wick St. Lawrence =

Church in Somerset, England

Church of St Lawrence
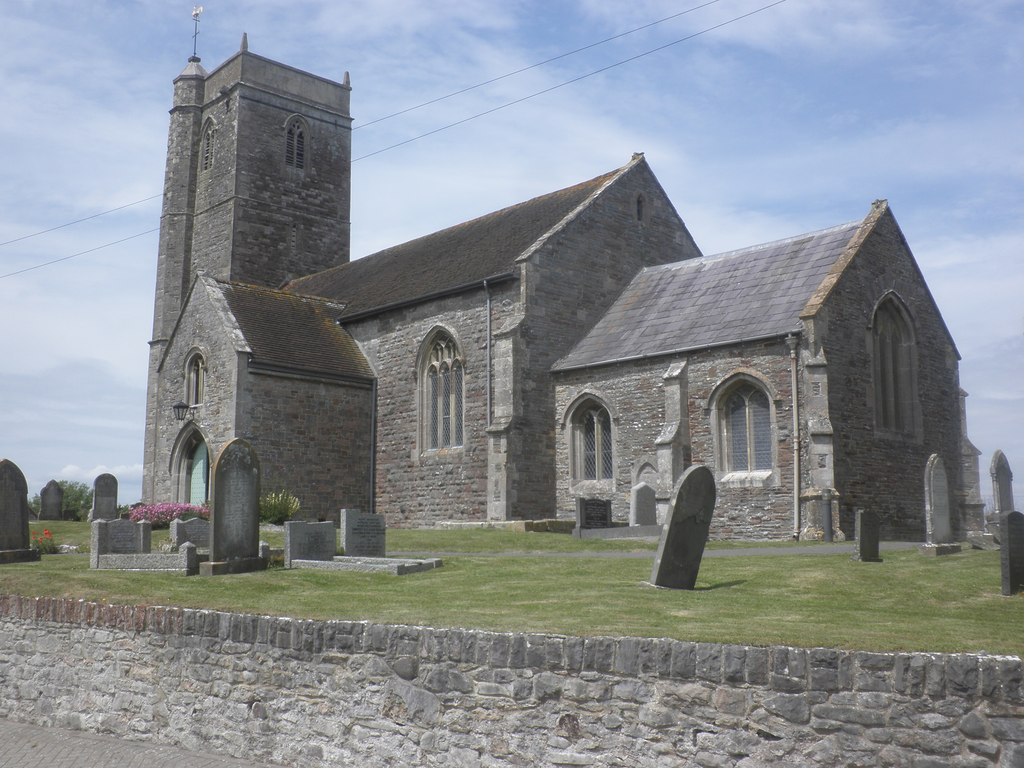

- Location within Somerset
- 51.3845°N 2.9119°W
- Location: Wick St. Lawrence, Somerset, England

History
- Built: 15th century

Listed Building – Grade II*
- Official name: Parish Church of St Lawrence
- Designated: 9 February 1961
- Reference no.: 1129773

The Anglican Church of St Lawrence, Wick St. Lawrence in the English county of Somerset dates mainly from the 15th century. It has been designated as a Grade II* listed building.

== History ==
The parish Church of Saint Lawrence is built largely of pink or grey Lias limestone combined with other local limestones and sandstones.

The church was struck by lightning in 1791 which caused cracks to open in the tower which was then reinforced with iron bands. Further deterioration required major restoration in 1864–1865 by Foster and Wood of Bristol.

The parish is part of the benefice of Worle within the Diocese of Bath and Wells.

== Architecture ==
The church has a three-bay nave, a two-bay chancel, a north vestry which was added in 1865 and a south porch.

The windows of the church are in the Perpendicular style. The three-stage tower has a peal of six bells; the oldest of which were cast in 1655.

The intricately carved stone pulpit came from Woodspring Priory in 1536 following the Dissolution of the Monasteries. The Priory had been bought by a Bristol merchant, William Carr, and his son and heir John Carr (who subsequently became Lord of the Manors of both Congresbury and (Wick St. Lawrence) arranged the pulpit's relocation.
