= Church of St John the Evangelist, Clevedon =

Church in Somerset, England

Church of St John the Evangelist
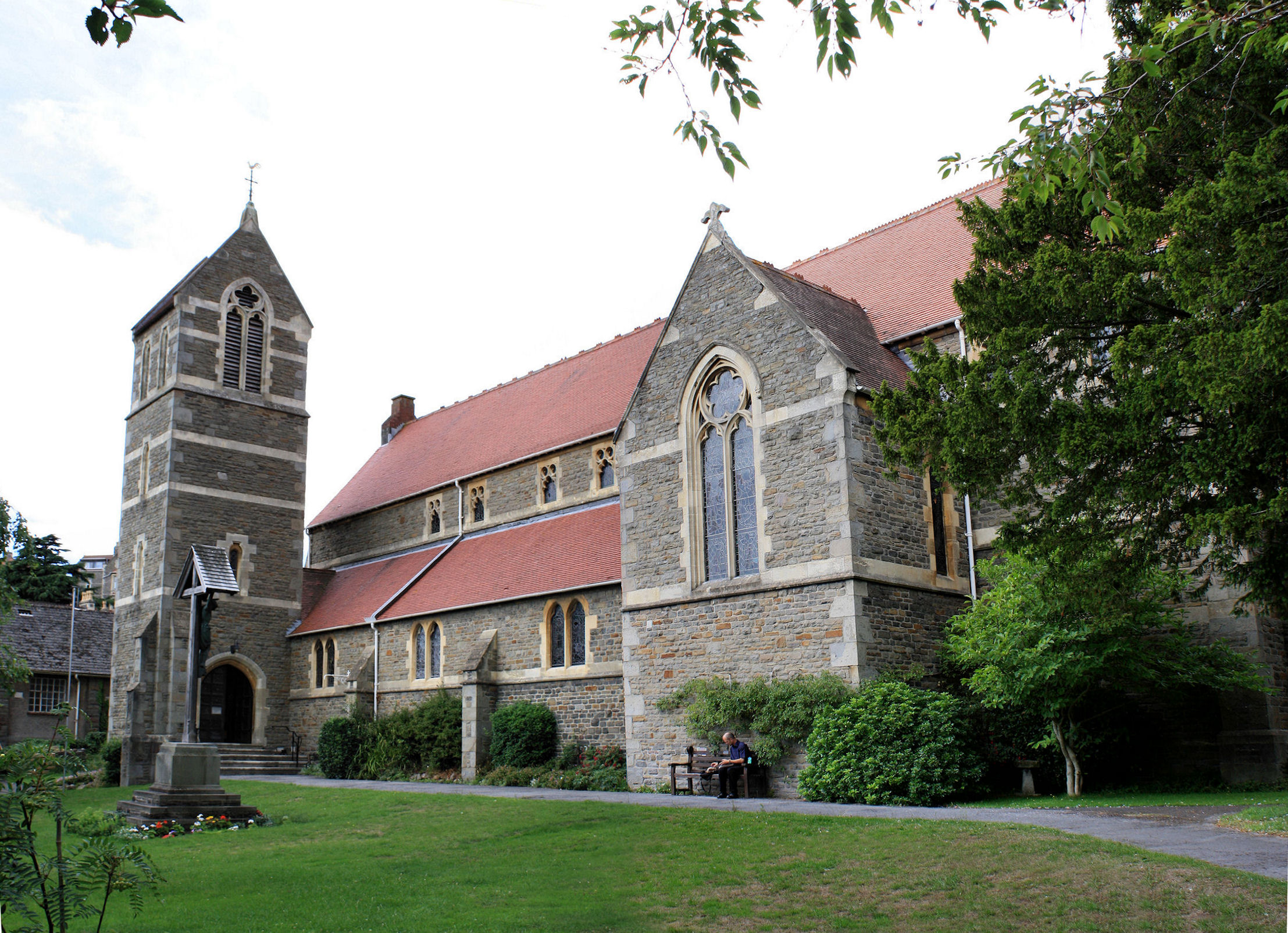

Religion
- Affiliation: Church of England
- Ecclesiastical or organizational status: Active
- Year consecrated: 1878

Location
- Location: Clevedon, Somerset, England
- Interactive map of Church of St John the Evangelist
- Coordinates: 51.4367°N 2.8550°W

Architecture
- Architect: William Butterfield
- Type: Church

The Church of St John the Evangelist is a Church of England church in Clevedon, Somerset, England. Designed by William Butterfield, it was built in 1876–78 at the expense of Sir Arthur Elton and has been a Grade II* listed building since 1976.

== History ==
St John's was built as the parish church of the newly formed ecclesiastical parish of South Clevedon, which separated from Clevedon in February 1876 as a result of a rapidly growing population. The church and its vicarage was built at the sole expense of Sir Arthur Elton of Clevedon Court and he commissioned William Butterfield to draw up the designs. Elton also provided an annual endowment of £100.

The foundation stone was laid by the Bishop of Bath and Wells, the Right Rev. Lord Arthur Hervey, on 19 October 1876, and construction was carried out by the contractor, Mr. William Restall of Bisley. While the church was being built, temporary services were held in some adjacent farm buildings, which received the name "Barn Church". The completed church was consecrated by the Bishop of Bath and Wells on 30 April 1878.

Elton also founded St John's National School in 1879. It was rebuilt in 1889, and became a library when a replacement school was opened in 1991. St John's church hall was built in the 1920s.

== Architecture ==
St John's is built of local stone, with dressings in Bath stone and tiles on the roof, in the Gothic Revival style. It was designed to accommodate 500 persons and made up of a nave, north and south aisles, chancel, north and south transepts, vestry and a south-west tower, with six (originally five) bells. A second vestry and new porch was added in 1883–84.

The chancel and nave has a low clerestory with small windows. The flooring is paved with encaustic and plain tiles, and the lower region of the interior walls of the nave and aisles lined with Staffordshire tiles. The chancel's walls and reredos were built using Devonshire and other marbles and Bath stone. The centre of the reredos has a marble cross, surrounded by four Evangelistic emblems. It was obscured by wood panelling until the 1990s.

The church's windows have middle pointed tracery and there is a rose window in the north transept. Heaton, Butler and Bayne of London supplied the stained glass of the chancel's five-light window and south transept's east window. The pulpit and choir fittings are made of oak and walnut wood. The organ was built by Henry Willis & Sons and gifted by Mr T. Sheldon.

In 1909, the stone arch of the interior was replaced by a girder and iron screen, owing to subsidence issues. The work was carried out by C. S. Hare.
