= Banwell Castle =

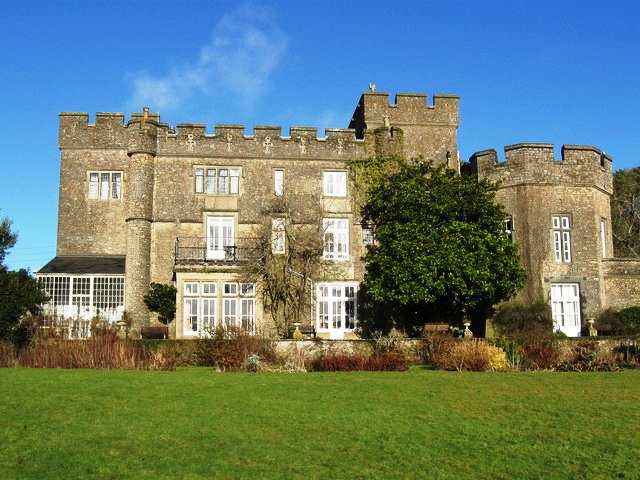

- Location within Somerset
- 51°19′25″N 2°51′36″W
- Location: Banwell, Somerset, England

History
- Built: 1847
- Built for: John Dyer Sympson

Site notes
- Architect: Augustus Pugin
- Architectural style: Victorian Gothic Revival

Listed Building – Grade II*
- Official name: Banwell Castle, terraces and courtyard walls
- Designated: 9 February 1961
- Reference no.: 1283203

Listed Building – Grade II*
- Official name: Coachhouse at Banwell Castle
- Designated: 17 January 1984
- Reference no.: 1129781

Listed Building – Grade II*
- Official name: Gatehouse, stables and flanking walls at Banwell Castle
- Designated: 9 February 1961
- Reference no.: 1320658

Listed Building – Grade II*
- Official name: Terrace and dairy at Banwell Castle
- Designated: 17 January 1984
- Reference no.: 1135437

Listed Building – Grade II*
- Official name: West garden walls with towers at Banwell Castle
- Designated: 17 January 1984
- Reference no.: 1129782

Banwell Castle is a Victorian Gothic Revival mansion in Banwell, Somerset, England. It is a Grade II* listed building.

== History ==
The land on which the house is built was owned by the Bishop of Bath and Wells. It was sold to John and Joan Landown in 1753. It was passed down to the Sympson family; John Dyer Sympson, a solicitor from London, built the castle as his home. It was completed in 1847. Built in the Gothic Revival style made popular by Augustus Pugin. it was expanded and embellished in the 1880s by Sir Elskin Baker, having passed to Sir William Baker, Other owners and tenants have been 1854 to 1874 Henry & Elizabeth Pigou then Sir William & Lady Frances Baker. In 1883 the Estate was sold to the Shaw Yate's family from Rotherham. In 1905 Kate Behrens of Manchester purchased the property. Mr & Mrs Hope made it their home, she died in 1916 and the Estate was then sold to Richard Calvert who in 1919 had the Bristol Architect Sir George Oatley do remodelling work on the property.

In World War II it was taken over by the Royal Air Force and used as the headquarters for No. 955 Squadron, which was a barrage balloon unit and part of Balloon Command. The gatehouse was used by the local Air Raid Precautions. In 1963 the Estate was sold to Simon and Phillipa Wills (of W.D. & H.O. Wills). Until 1976 the next owners were Charles Skilton, a book and postcard publisher, and Jean Desebrock from South Africa. In 1988 William H & Hugh A Parsons purchased part of the castle and later purchased the whole of the estate. It remains a family home but is used for weddings, pre booked dinner Parties, wakes and as a bed and breakfast.

== Architecture ==
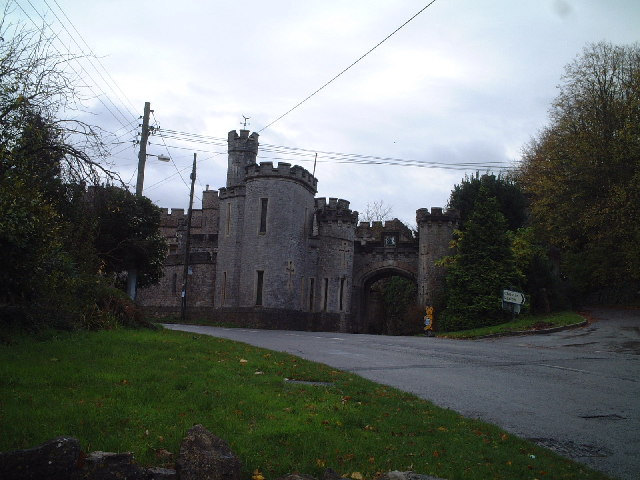
The gatehouse

The house has five windows in the three-storey main block between small circular turrets with other octagonal and hexagonal towers. In front of the house is a terrace with a trefoil pierced parapet with statutes of lions rampant with swords on embattled octagonal gate piers which flank six steps.

The coachhouse has a tall circular turret and contained a granary on the first floor. The gatehouse consists of a Chamfered double arch, with a parapet between circular embattled towers, with wrought iron gates with heraldic motifs. The walled kitchen garden, 170 metres (560 ft) south east of the house has another 4 metres (13 ft) tower. The terrace adjoining the house leads to a decorative dairy. The west garden walls include another tower.
