= Church of All Saints, Long Ashton =

Church in Somerset, England

Church of All Saints
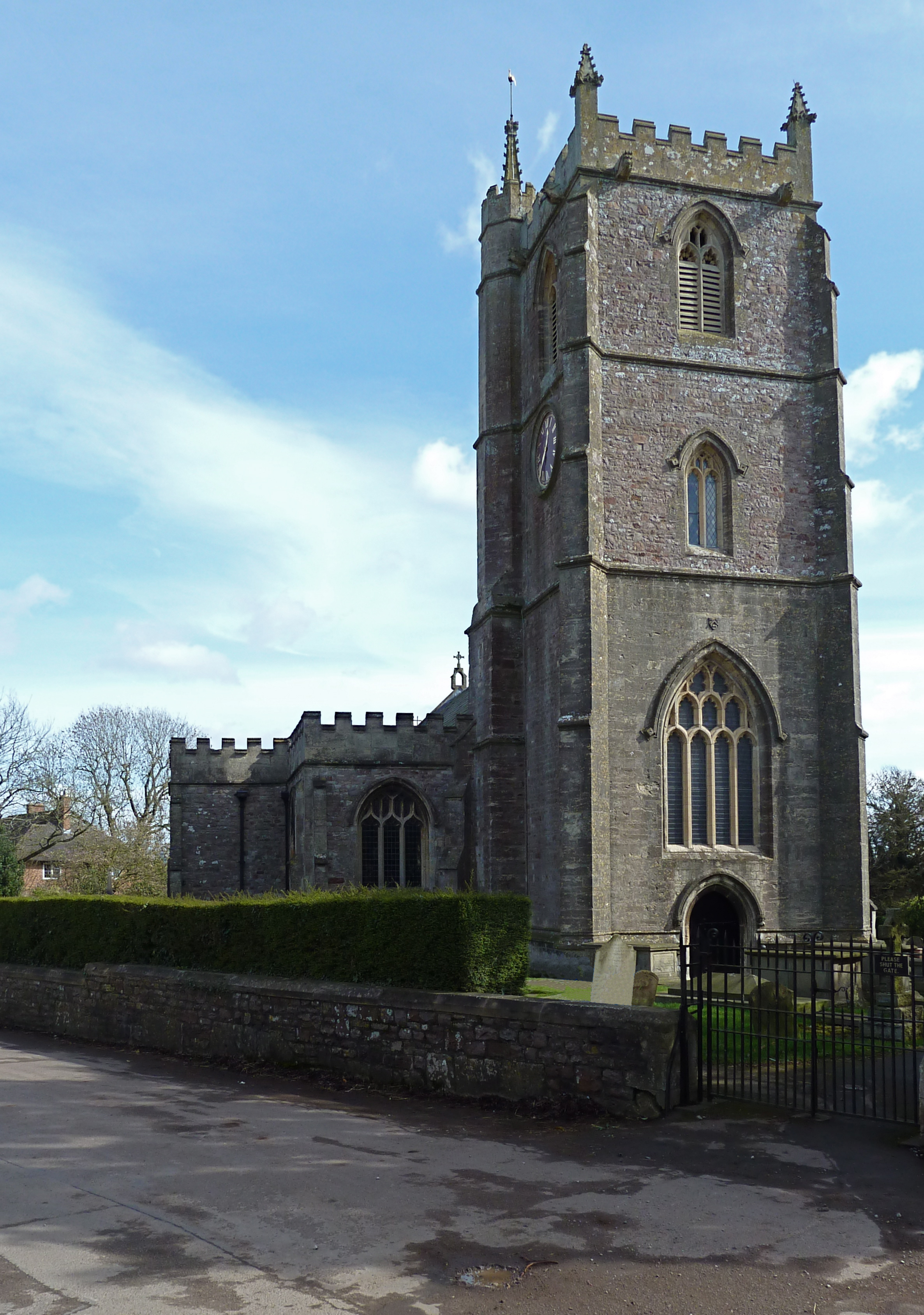

- Location within Somerset
- 51.4358°N 2.6438°W
- Location: Long Ashton, Somerset, England

History
- Built: 14th century

Listed Building – Grade II*
- Official name: Church of All Saints
- Designated: 11 October 1961
- Reference no.: 1138021

The Anglican Church of All Saints in Long Ashton was built in the 14th century although much of the fabric was rebuilt in the 1870s. It is a Grade II* listed building.

== History ==
The arms of its founder (Thomas de Lyons) are on the outside of the tower. The interior has some fine tombs, and some relatives of the poet Robert Southey are buried in the churchyard.

The building underwent Victorian restoration between 1871 and 1872 when the chancel, vestry and south chapel were added.

In 2011 the heating system in the church failed. Since then solar panels and new radiators have been installed. In 2016 an appeal was launched to replace the flagstones within the church.

The parish is part of the benefice of Long Ashton with Barrow Gurney and Flax Bourton within the Diocese of Bath and Wells.

== Architecture ==
The church has a nave, north and south aisles, chancel and vestry along with a three-stage west tower. The tower contains a peal of eight bells having been increased from six to eight in 1897 and rehung in 1903. The Tenor of this fine peal weighs in at 30.3.23 CWT or 1573 kg making the bells here the 11th heaviest ring of 8 in the world. After 107 years of continual use, the bells were rehung once again in 2010 By John Taylor & Co of Loughborough, and were hung on self aligning modern ball bearings, making the bells easier to ring.

The fine rood screen is from the 15th century. Within the church is a 19th-century church organ which was rebuilt by J.G.Haskins & Co.

== Churchyard ==
Amongst the gravestones and memorials in the churchyard are several which are Grade II* listed buildings. The oldest is for John and Alice Smith who died in 1591. A chest tomb of Elizabeth Phelps from 1698, and one of Anna Whiting from 1700, The memorial to George Whiting was added in 1709, and Robert Whiting in 1662, while another Robert Whiting is from 1679, and another with the same name from 1693. Together the chest tombs, which have renaissance details form an important group. Other monuments are to Philip Bower, the Pomroy family, the Ford family, Elizabeth Hayward, William Cambridge, William Poultney James Miller and John Howard.

The octagonal churchyard cross is late medieval and was moved to its current site in the late 19th century.

== See also ==
- List of ecclesiastical parishes in the Diocese of Bath and Wells
