= Hutton Court =

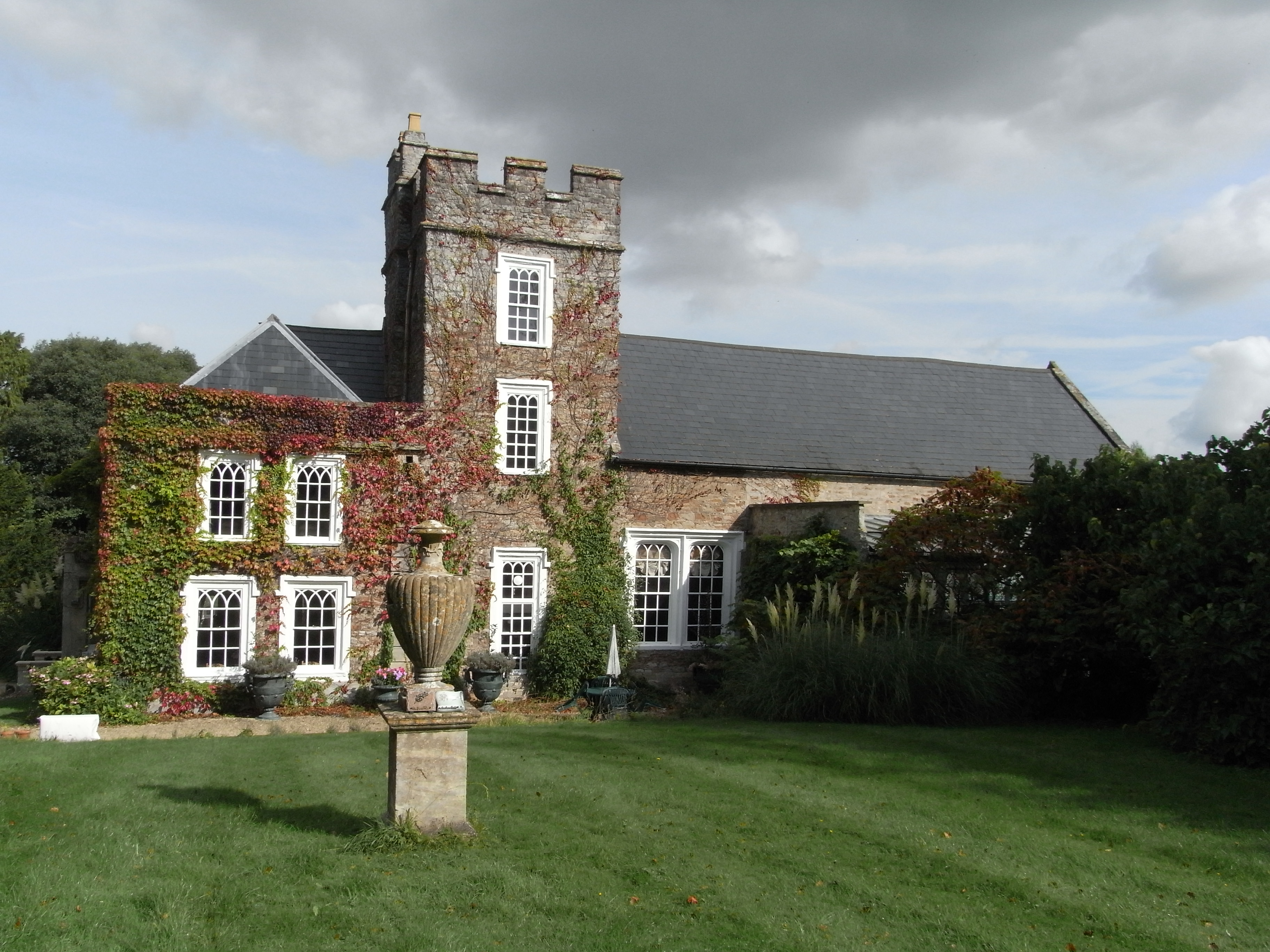

- Location within Somerset
- 51°19′21″N 2°55′46″W
- Location: Hutton, Somerset, England

History
- Built: 15th century

Listed Building – Grade II*
- Official name: Hutton Court
- Designated: 9 February 1961
- Reference no.: 1320991

Hutton Court is a country house at Hutton, Somerset, England, built in the 15th century as a manor house. It is Grade II* listed on the National Heritage List for England. In addition to the main house, the boundary wall, summerhouse and the gates and piers to the hall are all separately Grade II listed. and stands immediately to the south of the parish church.

== History ==
An earlier wooden manor house may have been on the same site or nearby. The earliest parts of the present building are the tower with its battlements and the dining room with its oak ceiling. The hall has a collar beam roof. At the house's north-east corner is a polygonal stair turret, and the chimneys of the west wing rise higher than the battlements of the main tower.

The local landowner John Payne acquired Hutton, amongst several other local manors, and by 1466 had established it as his primary residence. He died in 1496, passing it on to his son Thomas Payne and his descendants. By 1604 Nicholas Payne was in financial difficulties, and John Still, bishop of Bath and Wells, purchased the manor of Hutton and the residence of Hutton Court. His son Nathaniel Still built the western part of the court. On his death in 1626 the estate included the Court, two gardens, 80 acres (32 ha) of meadow, 50 acres (20 ha) of pasture and 100 acres (40 ha) of other land. It passed via the marriage of Nathaniel's daughter Anne to the Codrington family. William Codrington (died 1728), a descendant of Nathaniel Still, lived at Hutton Court.

In 1730 the house was bought by Humphrey Brent, a Bristol lawyer, and was passed on in the Brent family until 1837 when it was sold to Henry Adolphus Septimus Payne. By 1848 the house had been let to Edward Bowles Fripp, and in 1849 it was substantially altered by Samuel Charles Fripp, a Bristol architect.

The next owner was Edward Bisdee (1802–1870), a native of Oldmixon near Hutton who had made a fortune in Tasmania. He held the house and manor from the 1850s until his death, when he left them to his brother Alfred Henry Bisdee (1819–1898). He in turn passed Hutton Court on to his son Thomas Gamaliel Bisdee (1852–1933). It was then left to Thomas Edward Bisdee DSO, MC, (1888-1934), recently retired from the regular army, who was killed in a riding accident in April 1934. Due to incurring two lots of death duties within one year, the family could not afford to keep the Property and so in 1935 the house and contents were sold by auction, when the house was bought by a Captain Stamp. In 1948 it was sold again to a Captain G. W. Gwynne, who owned it until the 1950s, when it was sold to the Palmer family who lived there until the late 1970s. Hutton Court was then acquired by the Gnoyke family who turned it into a pub/restaurant, but in the 1990s a new owner returned it to use as a private residence. It is now up for auction as of 22/05/2024 as the owner has passed away.

== In literature ==
The sixteenth century poem The Greene Knight describes Sir Bredbeddle (the Green Knight) as living "in the west countrye" at "the castle of hutton". Scholars such as Frederick James Furnivall suggest that the author may have meant Hutton Court.
