= St Bridget's Church, Chelvey =

Church in Somerset, England

Church of St Bridget
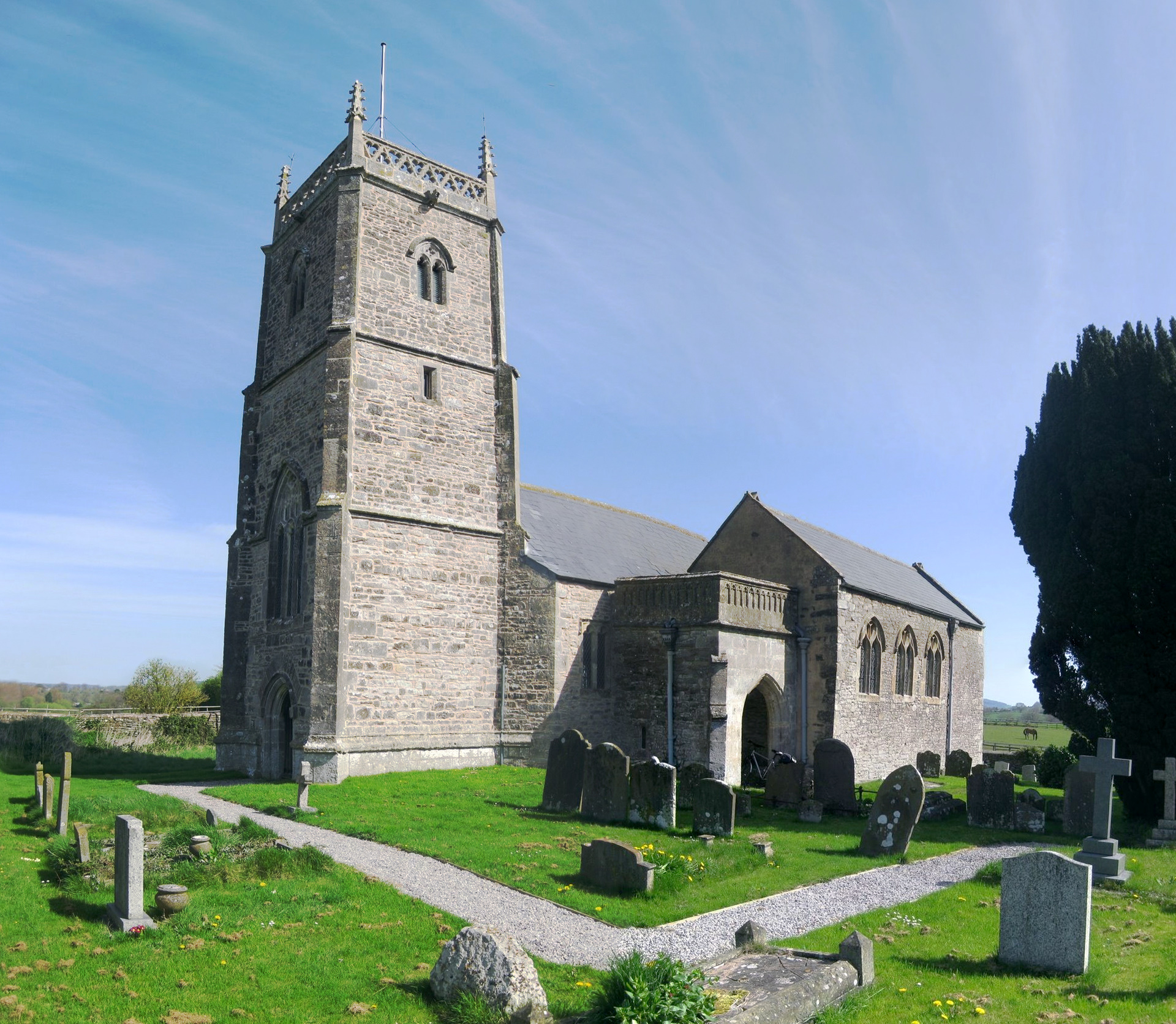

- Location within Somerset

General information
- Location: Chelvey, Brockley, Somerset, England
- Coordinates: 51.4119°N 2.7678°W
- Completed: 12th century

St. Bridget's Church in Chelvey, Brockley, Somerset, England dates from the 12th century, and has been designated by English Heritage as a Grade I listed building.

The church is dedicated to the Irish saint Brigid of Kildare.

The building includes a Norman south doorway and the octagonal font. There is also an inscribed Purbeck marble slab in the Tynte chapel under the Jacobean altar table. It dates from between 1250 and 1275, and shows the tall figure of an unknown 13th-century knight, clad in a long surcoat, grasping a spear in one hand and the scabbard of a sword in the other.

Near the pulpit is a replica sand-filled hour glass in an iron frame, previously used for preachers to time their sermons.

The churchyard cross is 1.5 metres (4 ft 11 in) high and sits on an octagonal base. At the top is a box and ball decoration which was added in 1877.

In the late 20th century the building had fallen into a state of disrepair with water seeping into the building, damaging the stonework. In 2008 an appeal was launched which raised money for the restoration, new lighting and a new organ.

== See also ==
- List of Grade I listed buildings in North Somerset
- List of towers in Somerset
- List of ecclesiastical parishes in the Diocese of Bath and Wells
