= Littleton gunpowder works =

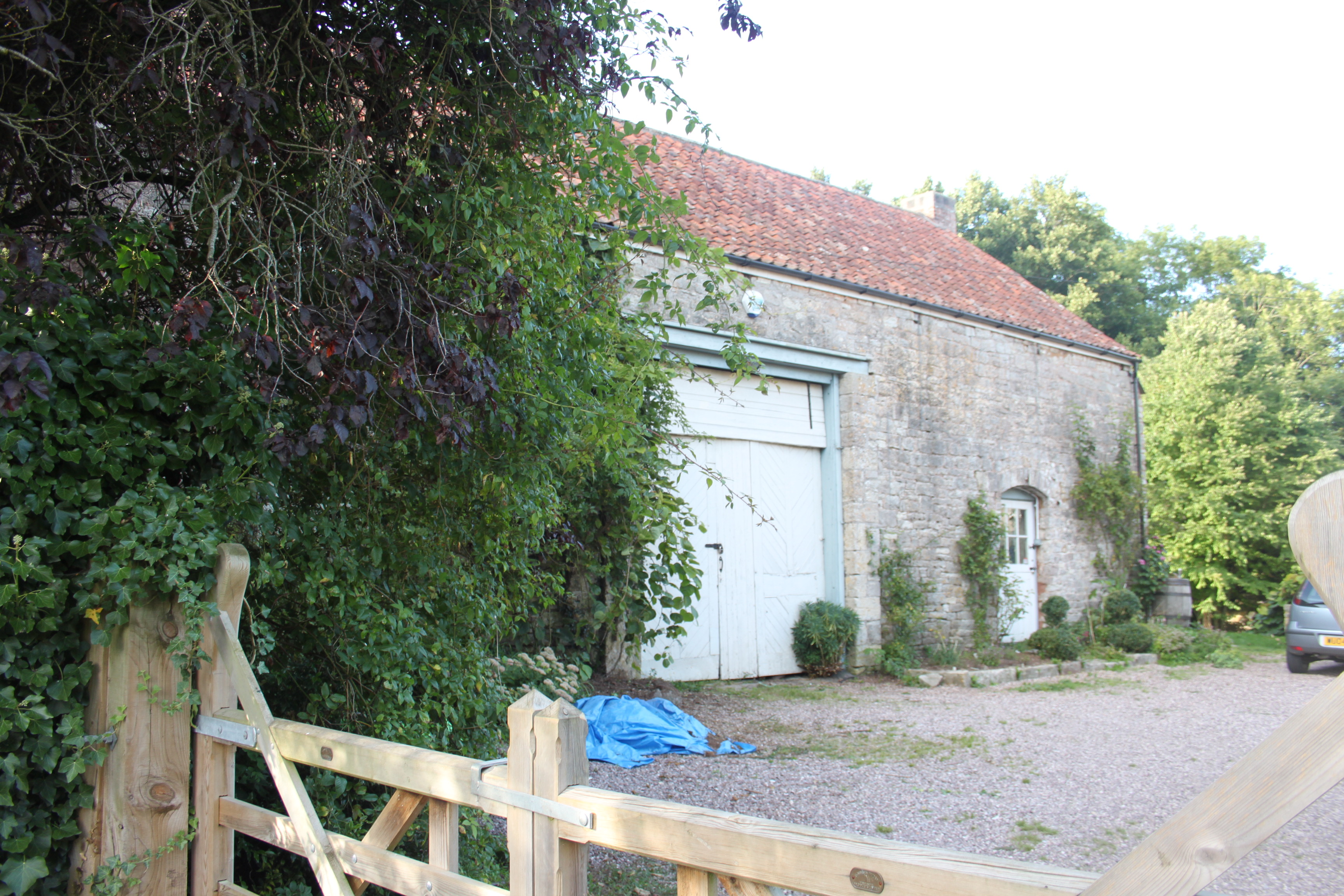

- Location within Somerset
- 51°22′37″N 2°38′54″W
- Location: Winford, Somerset, England

History
- Built: c. 1650

Scheduled monument
- Official name: Littleton gunpowder works at Powdermill Farm
- Designated: 17 May 2000
- Reference no.: 1019452

Listed Building – Grade II*
- Official name: Powdermill Farmhouse
- Designated: 18 September 1980
- Reference no.: 1158132

Listed Building – Grade II*
- Official name: Barn to southwest of Powerdermill Farmhouse
- Designated: 18 September 1980
- Reference no.: 1158144

Listed Building – Grade II
- Official name: Powder Mill Cottage
- Designated: 13 December 2001
- Reference no.: 1389623

Listed Building – Grade II
- Official name: Clock Tower approximately 300 Metres north west of Powerdermill Cottage
- Designated: 19 January 1987
- Reference no.: 1129216

Littleton gunpowder works between Winford and Chew Magna in the English county of Somerset, started gunpowder production around 1650 and continued until approximately 1820. It is a listed as a scheduled monument.

The powder mill opened around 1740 following the expansion of the port in Bristol and increased availability of saltpetre from India. The mill was controlled by merchants based in the city and supplied gunpowder to ships sailing from the port. A previous warehouse, on the site where Bristol Temple Meads railway station now stands was considered too dangerous in the city. Despite a fire in 1755 the Littleton works expanded to become the largest gunpowder producing works in South West England by the middle of the 18th century. There was some association with another gunpowder mill at Woolley near Bath and the purchase and conversion of a snuff mill at nearby Stanton Drew was considered. It closed in the 1820s after the end of the Napoleonic Wars.

It was powered by an overshot water wheel on Winford Brook a tributary of the River Chew.

Some of the buildings remain intact, while others are ruined. The farmhouse was built in the mid 16th century but has been added to and revised in the 17th, 18th and 19th centuries. It is a Grade II* listed building, as is the 17th century barn. Powder Mill Cottage was built in the 18th century as the cooperage for the powder mill. The clock tower which was part of the works was originally attached to a chapel or office.
