= Brockley, Somerset =

Village in Somerset, England

Coordinates: 51.3980°N 2.7603°W

Brockley
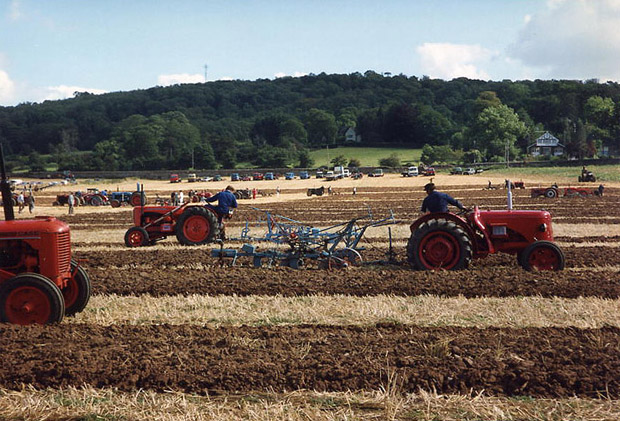
- Brockley ploughing match in 1991

- Location within Somerset
- Population: 277 (2011)
- OS grid reference: ST471668
- Unitary authority: North Somerset
- Ceremonial county: Somerset
- Region: South West
- Country: England
- Sovereign state: United Kingdom
- Post town: BRISTOL
- Postcode district: BS48
- Dialling code: 01275
- Police: Avon and Somerset
- Fire: Avon
- Ambulance: South Western
- UK Parliament: North Somerset

Brockley is a village and civil parish in Somerset, England. The parish is within the unitary authority of North Somerset, about 3 miles (4.8 km) south of Nailsea, and includes the village of Chelvey. According to the 2011 census it had a population of 277.

== History ==
To the west of Brockley is Taps Combe Camp, a Roman Iron Age hill fort. The hill fort is shaped a lot like a "D", and is approximately 50 metres (160 ft) by 50 metres (160 ft) wide.

The parish of Brockley was part of the hundred of Chewton, while Chelvey was part of the hundred of Hartcliffe.

Brockley was the location of a 300-person Prisoner of War camp during World War II, initially housing Italian prisoners from the Western Desert campaign, and later German prisoners post the Battle of Normandy.

== Governance ==
The parish council has responsibility for local issues, including setting an annual precept (local rate) to cover the council's operating costs and producing annual accounts for public scrutiny. The parish council evaluates local planning applications and works with the local police, district council officers, and neighbourhood watch groups on matters of crime, security, and traffic. The parish council's role also includes initiating projects for the maintenance and repair of parish facilities, such as the village hall or community centre, playing fields and playgrounds, as well as consulting with the district council on the maintenance, repair, and improvement of highways, drainage, footpaths, public transport, and street cleaning. Conservation matters (including trees and listed buildings) and environmental issues are also of interest to the council.

The parish falls within the unitary authority of North Somerset which was created in 1996, as established by the Local Government Act 1992. It provides a single tier of local government with responsibility for almost all local government functions within its area including local planning and building control, local roads, council housing, environmental health, markets and fairs, refuse collection, recycling, cemeteries, crematoria, leisure services, parks, and tourism. They are also responsible for education, social services, libraries, main roads, public transport, Trading Standards, waste disposal and strategic planning, although fire, police and ambulance services are provided jointly with other authorities through the Avon Fire and Rescue Service, Avon and Somerset Constabulary and the South Western Ambulance Service.

North Somerset's area covers part of the ceremonial county of Somerset but it is administered independently of the non-metropolitan county. Its administrative headquarters is in the town hall in Weston-super-Mare. Between 1 April 1974 and 1 April 1996, it was the Woodspring district of the county of Avon. Before 1974 that the parish was part of the Long Ashton Rural District.

The parish is represented in the House of Commons of the Parliament of the United Kingdom as part of the North Somerset constituency. It elects one Member of Parliament (MP) by the first past the post system of election, currently Liam Fox of the Conservatives. It was also part of the South West England constituency of the European Parliament prior to Britain leaving the European Union in January 2020, which elected seven MEPs using the d'Hondt method of party-list proportional representation.

== Geography ==
Brockley Combe is a wooded combe near the village. Bristol International Airport lies at the top of the combe. A minor road runs along the length of the combe, meeting the A370 at the lower end. The village is at the western edge of the Lulsgate Plateau, the Carboniferous limestone hills which form a northern outlier of the Mendip Hills.

== Landmarks ==
Brockley Hall Stables, the former stable block of Brockley Hall, is designated as a Site of Special Scientific Interest (SSSI) because the roofspace hosts a large breeding colony of greater horseshoe bats during summer. They are also a grade II listed building. Brockley Hall was a country house dating from the late 18th century, which was remodelled around 1825 in a plain Greek Revival style for J.H. Smyth-Pigott. It has now been converted into four houses.

Nailsea Court near Chelvey dates from the 15th century and is a Grade I listed building.

== Transport ==
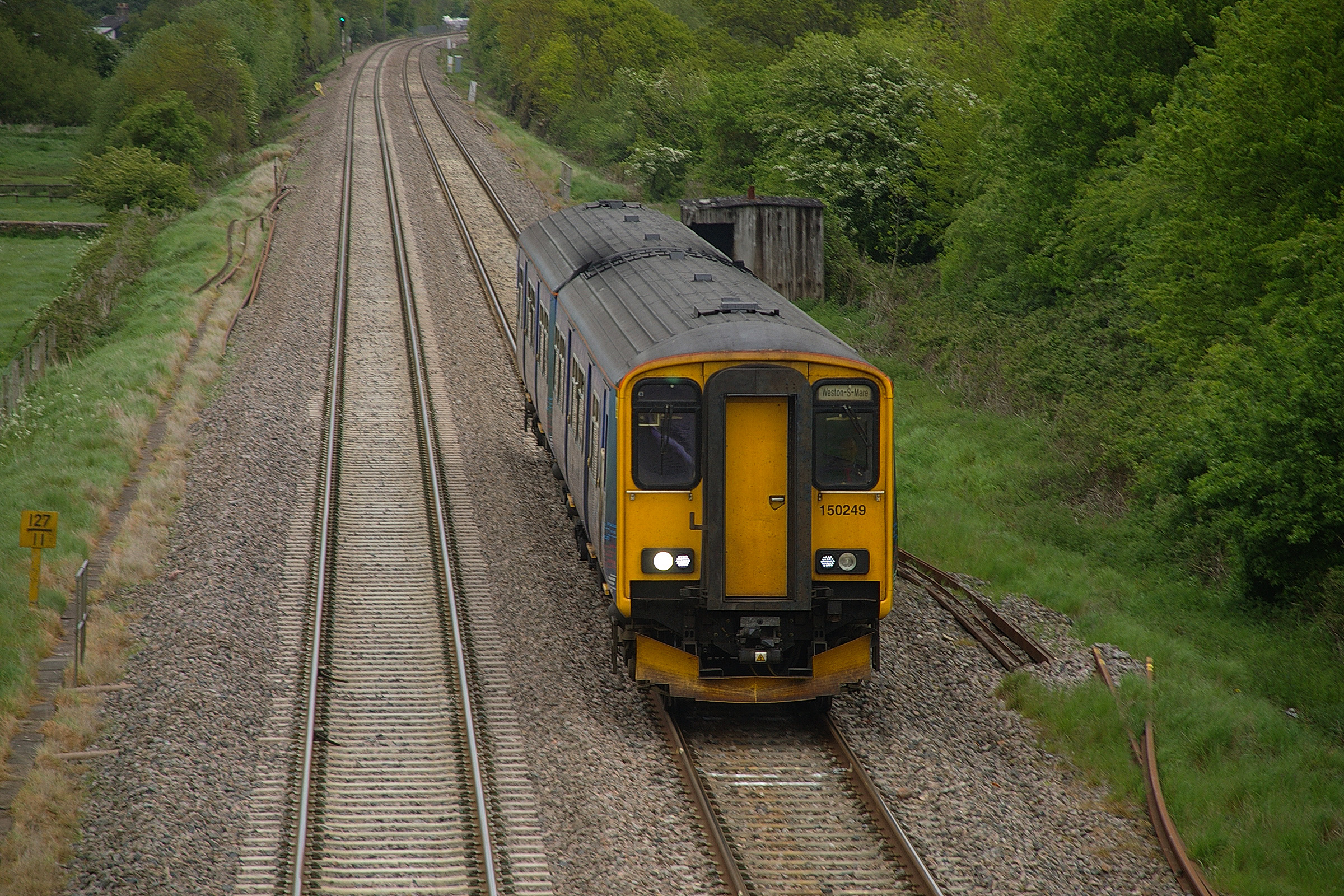
A First Great Western service on the Bristol to Taunton Line passes the bridge at Chelvey Lane.

The village is on the A370 between Bristol and Weston-super-Mare close to the Bristol Channel.

The village of Chelvey which is on the Bristol to Taunton Line with the nearest station being at Backwell. The parish is sectioned by the Bristol and Exeter Railway, now part of the First Great Western area.

== Religious sites ==
St. Nicholas' Church dates from the 12th century, and has been designated as a grade II* listed building. The church is in the care of the Churches Conservation Trust.

Church of St Bridget, Chelvey dates from the 12th century, and has been designated by English Heritage as a Grade I listed building. Chelvey Court was built around 1618 to 1660 as a manor house for Edward and John Tynte.
