= Wick St. Lawrence =

Village in Somerset, England

Coordinates: 51.384°N 2.912°W

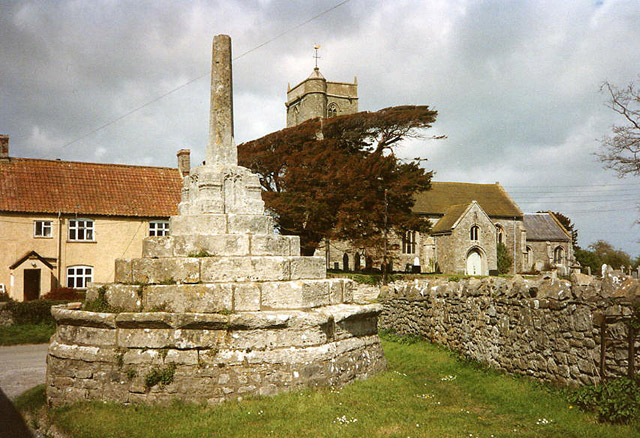
- Ancient cross and Church of St Lawrence

- Location within Somerset
- Population: 1,331
- OS grid reference: ST365655
- Unitary authority: North Somerset
- Ceremonial county: Somerset
- Region: South West
- Country: England
- Sovereign state: United Kingdom
- Post town: Weston-super-Mare
- Postcode district: BS22
- Dialling code: 01934
- Police: Avon and Somerset
- Fire: Avon
- Ambulance: South Western
- UK Parliament: Weston-super-Mare

Wick St. Lawrence is a civil parish and village in Somerset, England. It falls within the unitary authority of North Somerset. The population of the parish, which includes Bourton, Icelton and Ebdon, in the 2021 census was 1,437.

== History ==
The parish of Wick St Lawrence was part of the Winterstoke Hundred, while Bourton was in Portbury Hundred.

The 15th century village cross stands on an area of grass opposite the parish church, raised up on five ascending octagonal stone platforms. The crosshead was destroyed during the time of the English Civil Wars. It is a Grade II* listed building and Scheduled Ancient Monument.

The Ebdon Bow Bridge which carries the road from the village to nearby Worle over the River Banwell was built in the late 18th or early 19th century.

== Governance ==
North Somerset's area covers part of the ceremonial county of Somerset but it is administered independently of the non-metropolitan county. Its administrative headquarters are in the town hall in Weston-super-Mare. Between 1 April 1974 and 1 April 1996, it was the Woodspring district of the county of Avon. Before 1974 that the parish was part of the Axbridge Rural District.

== Religious sites ==
The windows of the church are in the Perpendicular style, while the modest tower has a peal of six bells; the oldest of which were cast in 1655. The intricately carved stone pulpit came from Woodspring Priory in 1536 following the Dissolution of the Monasteries.

It has been designated as a Grade II* listed building.
