= Church of St Michael and All Angels, Butcombe =

Church in Somerset, England

Church of St Michael and All Angels
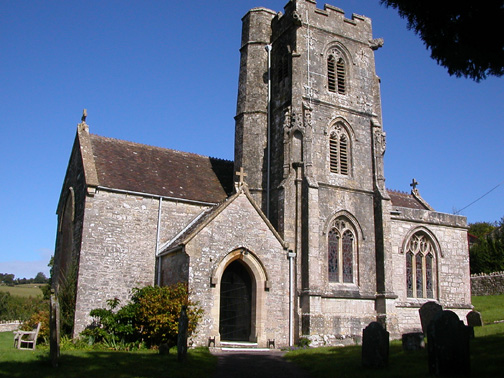

- Location within Somerset
- 51.3539°N 2.6973°W
- Location: Butcombe, Somerset, England

Listed Building – Grade II*
- Official name: Church of St. Michael and All Angels
- Designated: 9 February 1961
- Reference no.: 1129189

Listed Building – Grade II*
- Official name: Churchyard Cross in churchyard, south of Church of St. Michael and All Angels
- Designated: 19 January 1987
- Reference no.: 1129190

The Anglican Church of St Michael and All Angels at Butcombe in the English county of Somerset was built in the 15th century and restored in 1868. It is a Grade II* listed building.

== History ==
The church was built in the 15th century and restored in 1868.

The parish is part of the benefice of Wrington with Butcombe and Burrington within the Diocese of Bath and Wells.

== Architecture ==
The church includes a nave and chancel with a transeptal chapel and porch on the southern side and transept and vestry to the north.

The three-stage south tower is supported by set-back buttresses.

The churchyard cross dates from the 15th century and was restored in 1918. The base is octagonal and supports a 2 metres (6 ft 7 in) shaft with a 19th-century depiction of the crucifixion at the apex.

== See also ==
- List of ecclesiastical parishes in the Diocese of Bath and Wells
