= St Nicholas' Church, Brockley =

Church in Somerset, England

St Nicholas' Church
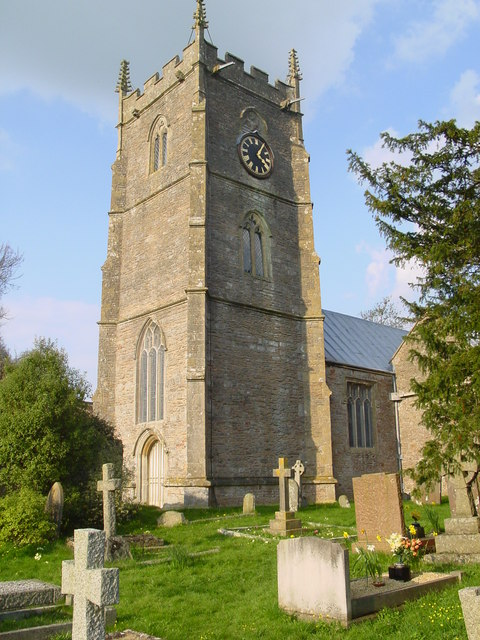

- Location within Somerset
- 51°23′58″N 2°46′09″W
- Location: Brockley, Somerset, England

History
- Built: 12th century

Site notes
- Architectural style: Norman
- Governing body: Churches Conservation Trust

Listed Building – Grade II*
- Official name: St. Nicholas' Church
- Designated: 11 October 1961
- Reference no.: 1137608

St Nicholas' Church in Brockley, Somerset, England dates from the 12th century, and is recorded in the National Heritage List for England as a designated Grade II* listed building. The church is a redundant church in the care of the Churches Conservation Trust. It was vested in the Trust on 1 April 1989.

The Norman church has a pinnacled tower which was added in the 15th century, and the whole church was extensively renovated in the 1820s by the Pigott family,. The font is Norman and there is a stone pulpit dating from around 1480. Inside the church is a Royal Coat of Arms dating from 1842 by William Edkins.

The building is used as a local arts venue with service generally being held in the church twice a year, however special permission can be obtained for weddings.

== See also ==
- List of churches preserved by the Churches Conservation Trust in Southwest England
- List of ecclesiastical parishes in the Diocese of Bath and Wells
