= Church of Saint Mary The Virgin, Hutton =

Church in Somerset, England

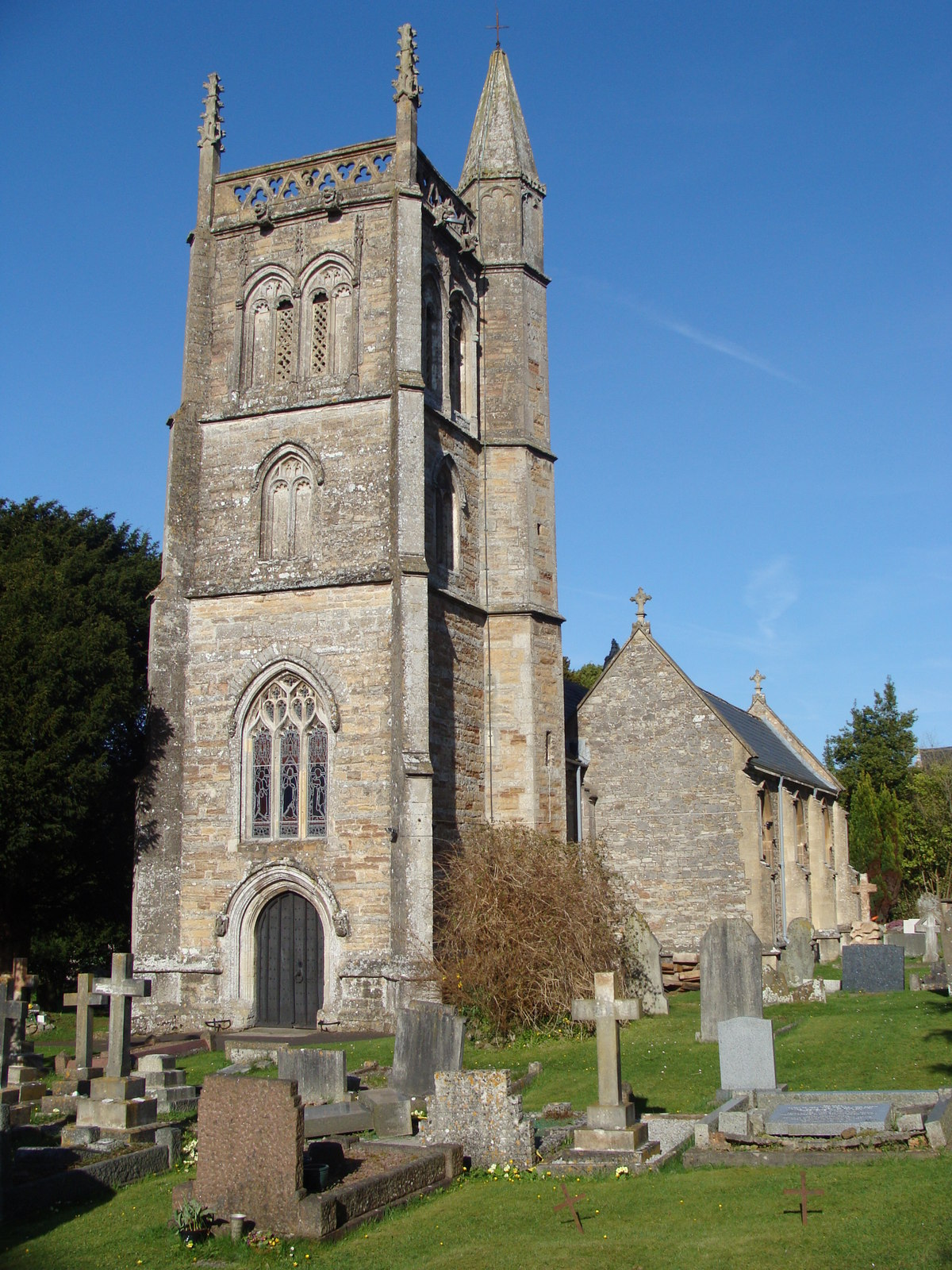

- Location within Somerset
- 51.3228°N 2.9307°W
- Location: Hutton, Somerset, England

History
- Built: 15th century

Listed Building – Grade II*
- Official name: Church of Saint Mary the Virgin
- Designated: 9 February 1961
- Reference no.: 1320975

The Anglican Church of Saint Mary The Virgin in Hutton within the English county of Somerset was built in the 15th century. It is a Grade II* listed building.

== History ==
The church was built in the 15th century on the site of an earlier church.

The parish is part of the benefice of Hutton and Locking, within the Diocese of Bath and Wells.

== Architecture ==
The church has a two-bay nave with a waggon roof, chancel and three-bay aisle. There is a three-stage west tower supported by diagonal buttresses. Within the tower is a ring of six bells. The bells were rehung and the sixth bell added in 2009.

== See also ==
- List of ecclesiastical parishes in the Diocese of Bath and Wells
