= Hutton, Somerset =

Village in Somerset, England

Coordinates: 51.32193°N 2.92699°W

Hutton
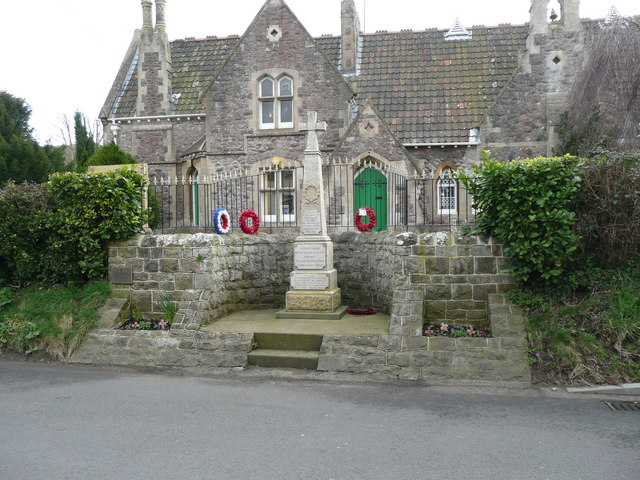
- Hutton War Memorial

- Location within Somerset
- Population: 2,582 (2011)
- OS grid reference: ST355585
- Unitary authority: North Somerset
- Ceremonial county: Somerset
- Region: South West
- Country: England
- Sovereign state: United Kingdom
- Post town: WESTON-SUPER-MARE
- Postcode district: BS24
- Dialling code: 01934
- Police: Avon and Somerset
- Fire: Avon
- Ambulance: South Western
- UK Parliament: Weston-super-Mare

Hutton is a village and civil parish in Somerset, England. The parish, which has a population of 2,582, is within the unitary authority of North Somerset and located on the western edge of the Mendip Hills, close to Weston-super-Mare.

The hamlets of Elborough, Lower Canada and Upper Canada lie within the parish.

== Toponymy ==
Hutton was listed in the Domesday Book of 1086 as Hotune, meaning 'the enclosure on the projection of land' from the Old English hōh ("hill-spur") and tūn ("estate, enclosure").

The parish once also contained a place called Cedern, now lost, whose name was an example of an English place-name deriving from Common Brittonic, where ced is the word found in modern Welsh as coed ("woodland") and -ern is a suffix used to form place-names.

== History ==
Elborough Hill is an Iron Age hill fort in the south east of the parish, with associated Iron Age or Romano-British field systems.

The parish was part of the Winterstoke Hundred.

Hutton Court was built in the 15th century as a manor house and has been classified as a Grade II* listed building.

Hutton has been twinned with the Kenyan village of Dabaso since 1999.

== Governance ==
The parish council has responsibility for local issues, including setting an annual precept (local rate) to cover the council's operating costs and producing annual accounts for public scrutiny. The parish council evaluates local planning applications and works with the local police, district council officers, and neighbourhood watch groups on matters of crime, security, and traffic. The parish council's role also includes initiating projects for the maintenance and repair of parish facilities, such as the village hall or community centre, playing fields and playgrounds, as well as consulting with the district council on the maintenance, repair, and improvement of highways, drainage, footpaths, public transport, and street cleaning. Conservation matters (including trees and listed buildings) and environmental issues are also of interest to the council.

The parish falls within the unitary authority of North Somerset which was created in 1996, as established by the Local Government Act 1992. It provides a single tier of local government with responsibility for almost all local government functions within its area including local planning and building control, local roads, council housing, environmental health, markets and fairs, refuse collection, recycling, cemeteries, crematoria, leisure services, parks, and tourism. It is also responsible for education, social services, libraries, main roads, public transport, trading standards, waste disposal and strategic planning, although fire, police and ambulance services are provided jointly with other authorities through the Avon Fire and Rescue Service, Avon and Somerset Constabulary and the South Western Ambulance Service.

North Somerset's area covers part of the ceremonial county of Somerset but it is administered independently of the non-metropolitan county. Its administrative headquarters is in the town hall in Weston-super-Mare. Between 1 April 1974 and 1 April 1996, it was the Woodspring district of the county of Avon. Before 1974 the parish was part of the Axbridge Rural District.

The village falls in 'Hutton and Locking' electoral ward. The ward starts in the north at Locking visits Hutton and continues south to Bleadon. The total population taken from the 2011 census was 6,417.

The parish is represented in the House of Commons of the Parliament of the United Kingdom as part of the Weston-super-Mare county constituency. It elects one Member of Parliament (MP) by the first past the post system of election.

== Religious sites ==
The Church of St Mary the Virgin dates from the 15th century and is a Grade II* listed building.
