= North Somerset =

District in England

- Unitary authority
- North Somerset within Somerset
- Sovereign state: United Kingdom
- Constituent country: England
- Region: South West England
- Ceremonial county: Somerset
- Admin HQ: Weston-super-Mare
- Area first created: 1 April 1974
- Unitary status: 1 April 1996

Government
  - Type: Unitary authority
  - Governing body: North Somerset Council
  - MPs: Dan Aldridge (Labour, Weston-super-Mare constituency); Sadik Al-Hassan (Labour, North Somerset constituency)

Area
  - Total: 144.66 sq mi (374.68 km^{2})

Population (2024)
  - Total: 224,578 (Ranked 85th)

Ethnicity (2021)
  - Ethnic groups: List: 95.7% White; 1.7% Mixed; 1.5% Asian; 0.6% other; 0.5% Black

Religion (2021)
  - Religion: List: 46.6% Christianity; 45.3% no religion; 7.5% other; 0.6% Islam
- Time zone: UTC0 (GMT)
  - Summer (DST): UTC+1 (BST)
- ISO 3166 code: GB-NSM
- Website: n-somerset.gov.uk

North Somerset is a unitary authority in the ceremonial county of Somerset, England. The council is based in Weston-super-Mare, the area's largest town. The district also contains the towns of Clevedon, Nailsea and Portishead, along with a number of villages and surrounding rural areas. Some southern parts of the district fall within the Mendip Hills, a designated Area of Outstanding Natural Beauty.

The district was formed in 1974 as the Woodspring district of the county of Avon. Avon was abolished in 1996, when the district was renamed North Somerset and its council took on county-level functions from the abolished county council.

The district is on the coast, facing the Bristol Channel to the west. The neighbouring districts are Bristol, Bath and North East Somerset and Somerset.

== History ==
The district was created on 1 April 1974 under the Local Government Act 1972, covering four former districts and part of a fifth, which were all abolished at the same time:

- Axbridge Rural District (part, being Steep Holm island and parishes lying generally north of the River Axe and Mendip Hills, rest split between Mendip and Sedgemoor)
- Clevedon Urban District
- Long Ashton Rural District
- Portishead Urban District
- Weston-super-Mare Municipal Borough

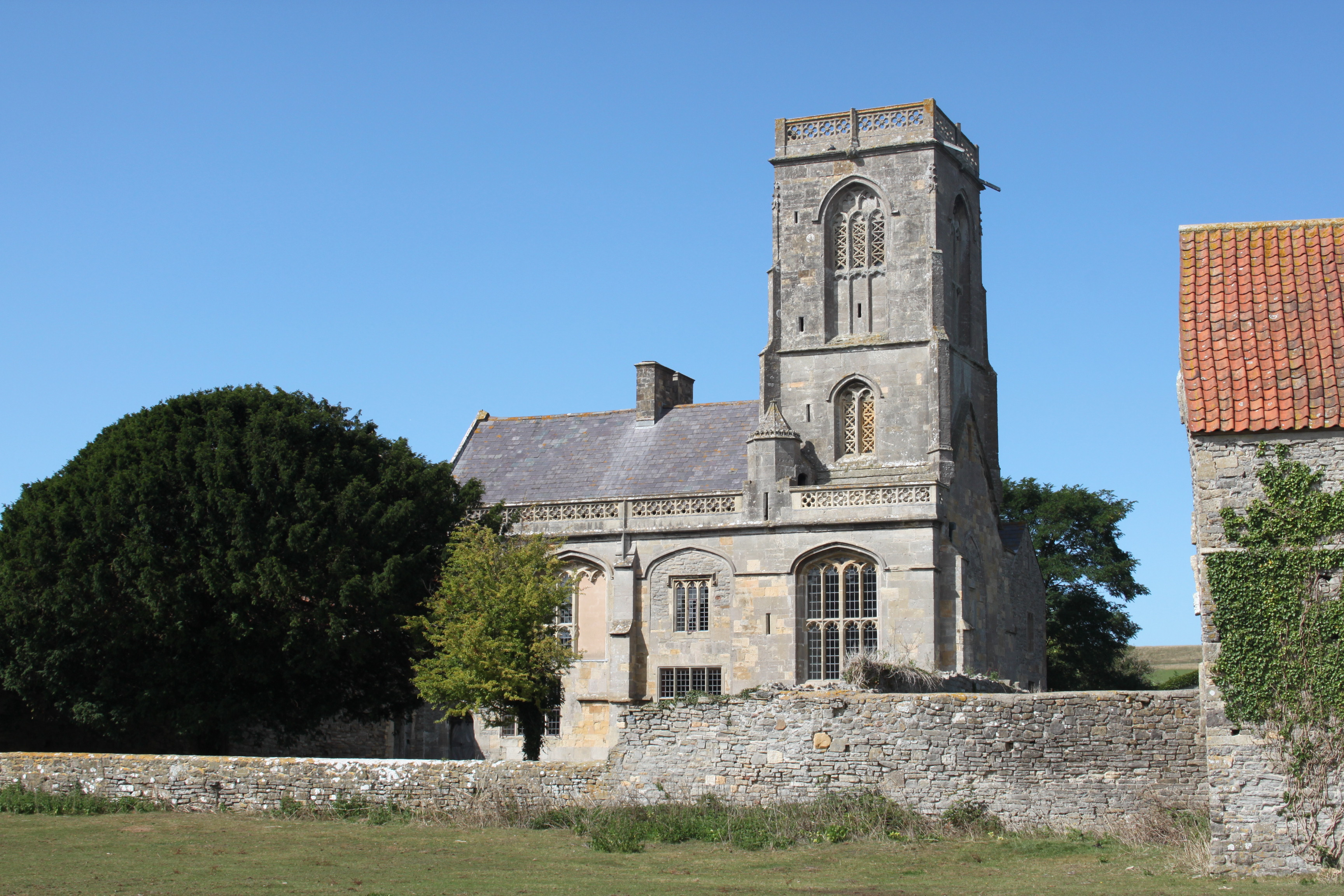
Woodspring Priory, which gave its name to the district as created in 1974.

The whole area had been part of Somerset prior to the 1974 reforms, but was transferred to the new county of Avon. The new district was named Woodspring after Woodspring Priory, an isolated medieval church near the coast in the parish of Kewstoke, north of Weston-super-Mare.

Following the Banham Review, the county of Avon was abolished in 1996, with the area being divided into unitary authorities responsible for both district and county-level functions. Woodspring became one of the unitary authorities, and the government gave the district the new name "North West Somerset" as part of the reforms. The area was also transferred back to Somerset for the ceremonial purposes of lieutenancy and shrievalty.

In July 1995 the council resolved to change the name to "North Somerset" with effect from when the reforms came into effect on 1 April 1996. Some years later the government identified that the council's decision to rename in 1995 may not have been technically valid, and so in 2005 the council passed another resolution formally changing the name to put the matter beyond doubt.

== Governance ==
North Somerset Council provides both county-level and district-level services. The whole area is also covered by civil parishes, which form a second tier of local government.

The area comprises the parliamentary constituencies of Weston-super-Mare and North Somerset.

== Settlements ==
Map of wards within North Somerset

The principal towns in the district are the coastal towns of Weston-super-Mare, Portishead, Clevedon and Nailsea.

- Abbots Leigh
- Backwell, Banwell, Barrow Gurney, Blagdon, Bleadon, Bourton, Brockley, Burrington, Butcombe
- Cambridge Batch, Chelvey, Christon, Churchill, Clapton in Gordano, Claverham, Cleeve, Clevedon, Congresbury
- Downside, Dundry
- East End, East Hewish, East Rolstone, Easton in Gordano
- Failand, Farleigh, Felton, Flax Bourton
- Ham Green, Hutton
- Icelton
- Kenn, Kewstoke, Kingston Seymour
- Leigh Woods, Locking, Lodway, Long Ashton, Lower Failand, Lower Langford, Loxton, Lulsgate Bottom
- Maiden Head, Milton
- Nailsea, North End, North Weston
- Pill, Portbury, Portishead, Puxton
- Redcliffe Bay, Redhill, Regil, Rickford
- Sandford, Sheepway, Sidcot, St Georges, St Mary's Grove
- Tickenham
- Uphill, Upper Town
- Walton in Gordano, West End, West Hewish, West Town, West Wick, Weston in Gordano, Weston-super-Mare, Wick St. Lawrence, Winford, Winscombe, Worle, Wraxall, Wrington
- Yatton

== Places of interest ==
North Somerset's natural environment and coastal towns attract visitors from nearby cities. Notable geographical features include:

- Gordano Valley
- Mendip Hills – the ridgeway forms part of the district boundary
- Sand Bay and Sand Point
- Worlebury Hill
- Burrington Combe, Goblin Combe, Brockley Combe
- North Somerset Levels

Notable religious sites include Woodspring Priory.

== Parishes ==
Image	Name	Status	Population	Former local authority	Coordinates	Refs
Stone building with prominent three stage square tower. In the foreground is a grass area and road separated from the church by a stone wall.	Abbots Leigh	Civil parish	799	Long Ashton Rural District	51.46°N 2.65°W	
Road signs with Backwell in black writing on white background and below it another sign saying village of the year South West and Wales regional winner 1997.	Backwell	Civil parish	4,589	Long Ashton Rural District	51.41°N 2.73°W	
Stone building with slit windows and battlements. Foreground is road with grass verges.	Banwell	Civil parish	2,919	Axbridge Rural District	51.32°N 2.86°W	
Water contained within stone walls to the right of road. In the background stone house with red roof.	Barrow Gurney	Civil parish	349	Long Ashton Rural District	51.40°N 2.67°W	
Church tower surrounded by trees with water in the background.	Blagdon	Civil parish	1,116	Axbridge Rural District	51.33°N 2.72°W	
Square three stage stone tower. To the right is a building with a white wall and in the foreground a parked car.	Bleadon	Civil parish	1,079	Axbridge Rural District	51.31°N 2.94°W	
Brown field being ploughed by multiple red tractors. In the background it a hill with trees.	Brockley	Civil parish	277	Long Ashton Rural District	51.39°N 2.76°W	
Stone building with arched windows and a square tower.	Burrington	Civil parish	464	Axbridge Rural District	51.33°N 2.74°W	
Stone building with arched windows and a square tower.	Butcombe	Civil parish	218	Axbridge Rural District	51.35°N 2.69°W	
Multiple houses mostly with red roofs seen in a valley between the vegetation in the foreground and the hills beyond.	Churchill	Civil parish	2,235	Axbridge Rural District	51.33°N 2.79°W	
Red brick building with tall chimneys. In the foreground is an arched gateway.	Clapton in Gordano	Civil parish	348	Long Ashton Rural District	51.46°N 2.75°W	
Stone building with arched windows and central square tower. In the foreground are trees and a road.	Cleeve	Civil parish	902	Long Ashton Rural District	51.39°N 2.77°W	
Metal pier standing on thin legs rising from the sea. Beach in the foreground	Clevedon	Town	21,281	Clevedon Urban District	51.43°N 2.85°W	
Roofs of houses showing amongst tree with prominent church tower. In the foreground are green fields with hills behind.	Congresbury	Civil parish	3,497	Axbridge Rural District	51.37°N 2.81°W	
Yellow stone church tower above other buildings of the same stone. In the foreground is a grassy field with cows.	Dundry	Civil parish	829	Long Ashton Rural District	51.39°N 2.64°W	
Street sign with the words Welcome to Easton in Gordano & Pill.	Easton in Gordano	Civil parish	4,828	Long Ashton Rural District	51.48°N 2.69°W	
Three stage square stone church tower on the left. Red painted building on the right and a rainbow.	Flax Bourton	Civil parish	715	Long Ashton Rural District	51.42°N 2.71°W	
Stone cross, with red wreaths, separated from a building behind by metal railings.	Hutton	Civil parish	2,582	Axbridge Rural District	51.32°N 2.93°W	
Stone church with square tower in the background partially obscured by trees. To the left is a pink painted house with red roof and in the foreground a car and grass area.	Kenn	Civil parish	431	Long Ashton Rural District	51.42°N 2.84°W	
Square stone tower and red roofed buildings behind a stone wall and partially obscured by trees.	Kewstoke	Civil parish	1,690	Axbridge Rural District	51.37°N 2.96°W	
Street scene with area between two roads containing trees and stone column behind a white fence.	Kingston Seymour	Civil parish	388	Long Ashton Rural District	51.39°N 2.86°W	
	Locking	Civil parish	2,756	Axbridge Rural District	51.33°N 2.91°W	
Yellow painted building fronting the road is nearest the camera. In the background is the square stone tower.	Long Ashton	Civil parish	6,044	Long Ashton Rural District	51.43°N 2.65°W	
The houses and church of a small village can be seen in the bottom left of the picture. It is surrounded by a patchwork of fields with some trees on a hillside. Large hills in the distance.	Loxton	Civil parish	192	Axbridge Rural District	51.29°N 2.89°W	
lots of house roofs, with trees and grass in the foreground and hills in the distance.	Nailsea	Town	15,630	Long Ashton Rural District	51.43°N 2.76°W	
Square stone tower behind churchyard with cross and gravestones.	Portbury	Civil parish	827	Long Ashton Rural District	51.47°N 2.72°W	
Multiple buildings including terraces, detached houses and blocks of flats. In the foreground are fields and in the background water and then hills.	Portishead	Town	23,699	Portishead Urban District; Long Ashton Rural District	51.48°N 2.77°W	
Low building with tiled roof and non-vertical square tower, surrounded by trees and with grass in the foreground.	Puxton	Civil parish	359	Axbridge Rural District	51.37°N 2.85°W	
White fronted shop with sign saying St Georges News	St Georges	Civil parish	3,379	Axbridge Rural District	51.36°N 2.90°W	
Stone church view from a low angle. The church has a simple tower and there are gravestones in the churchyard surrounding it	Tickenham	Civil parish	910	Axbridge Rural District	51.44°N 2.80°W	
The markings on a road junction around a tree are visible in the foreground, in front of a small shop with Christmas decorations in the window. A red K8 model telephone box and a red post box built into a wall are to the left.	Walton in Gordano	Civil parish	273	Axbridge Rural District	51.45°N 2.83°W	
Stone building with arched windows and square tower. In the foreground is a grass area with gravestones.	Weston in Gordano	Civil parish	301	Axbridge Rural District	51.46°N 2.79°W	
Multiple houses and other buildings around a bay into which a pier projects. In the background is a hill.	Weston super Mare	Town	76,143	Axbridge Rural District; Weston super Mare Municipal Borough	51.35°N 2.97°W	
Stone steps up to a stone shaft which would once have had a cross at the top. To the left are yellow painted houses. To the right is an old stone church with a square tower partially obscured by trees.	Wick St Lawrence	Civil parish	1,331	Axbridge Rural District	51.38°N 2.91°W	
Stone building with tiled roof. Sign saying Prince of Waterloo. In the foreground are tables, benches and planters.	Winford	Civil parish	2,153	Long Ashton Rural District	51.38°N 2.66°W	
Street scene with houses and shops on both side of road on which there is a tractor.	Winscombe and Sandford	Civil parish	4,546	Axbridge Rural District	51.31°N 2.83°W	
Stone building with square tower. In the foreground are gravestones.	Wraxall and Failand	Civil parish	2,302	Long Ashton Rural District	51.44°N 2.73°W	
Street scene showing shops and houses with cars.	Wrington	Civil parish	2,633	Axbridge Rural District	51.36°N 2.76°W	
Row of shops in pedestrianised precinct. In the foreground a bus shelter and tree.	Yatton	Civil parish	7,552	Long Ashton Rural District	51.39°N 2.83°W	

== Economy ==
North Somerset's economy is traditionally based on agriculture, including sheep raised for wool on the Mendip Hills and dairy farming in the valleys. This is celebrated at the annual North Somerset Show. During the Georgian era tourism became a significant economic sector in the coastal towns, most notably Weston-super-Mare which grew from a small village to a large resort town. Though tourism declined in the mid to late-20th century, in common with most British coastal resorts, this sector of the economy has stabilised.

In the 19th century the major port city of Bristol found that modern ships had outgrown the narrow river approach and the Port of Bristol company began seeking locations for new docks on the coast. The first of these was Portishead Dock, which handled coal from South Wales, though this too has seen shipping outgrow its facilities. The newer Royal Portbury Dock is noted for the large volume of car imports.

This is a chart of trend of regional gross value added of North and North East Somerset and South Gloucestershire at current basic prices (pp. 240–253) by Office for National Statistics with figures in millions of British Pounds Sterling.

Year	Regional gross value added^{1}	Agriculture^{2}	Industry^{3}	Services^{4}
1995	5,916	125	1,919	3,872
2000	8,788	86	2,373	6,330
2003	10,854	67	2,873	7,914

^1 Components may not sum to totals due to rounding
^2 includes hunting and forestry
^3 includes energy and construction
^4 includes financial intermediation services indirectly measured

== Demographics ==
North Somerset compared
UK census 2001	North Somerset UA	South West England	England
Total population	188,564	4,928,434	49,138,831
Foreign born	9.5%	9.4%	9.2%
White	97.1%	97.7%	91%
Asian	1.7%	0.7%	4.6%
Black	0.9%	0.4%	2.3%
Christian	75.0%	74.0%	72%
Muslim	0.2%	0.5%	3.1%
Hindu	0.1%	0.2%	1.1%
No religion	16.6%	16.8%	15%
Over 75 years old	9.9%	9.3%	7.5%
Unemployed	2.1%	2.6%	3.3%

North Somerset covers an area of around 145 square miles (380 km^{2}) and has a resident population of 193,000 (1.4% BME) living in 85,000 households.

The population of North Somerset has doubled since the 1950s and is predicted to rise by 6,184 or 3.0% to 2011 and by 17% to 2026. Whilst the proportion of people in North Somerset who are under 45 is lower than the national average, population growth is predicted to be strongest in the 2034 age group. Conversely North Somerset has a 4.2% higher percentage of older people (60+ female, 65+ male) than the rest of England and Wales. This disparity increases with age with the percentage of the population over 75 years almost 30% higher than the national average, resulting in a relatively aged population.

In 2001 there were 134,132 people of working age living in North Somerset and 91,767 were in employment; an economic activity rate of 68.4%. This is very close to the economic activity rate of the West of England sub-region which was 68.8% in the 2001 census.

The 2001 census stated that 1.38% of North Somerset residents identified themselves as belonging to a visible ethnic group and a further 1.27% identified themselves as 'white other'.

Population since 1801
Year	1801	1851	1901	1911	1921	1931	1941	1951	1961	1971	1981	1991	2001
Population North Somerset	16,670	33,774	60,066	68,410	75,276	82,833	91,967	102,119	119,509	139,924	160,353	179,865	188,556

== Education ==
As of 2023, North Somerset Council is associated with 72 primary schools and 18 secondary schools. There are also four independent (private) schools in the area.

Weston College is the main provider of further education in the area. University Centre Weston offers higher education courses in conjunction with Bath Spa University and the University of the West of England.

== See also ==
- Grade I listed buildings in North Somerset
- Grade II* listed buildings in North Somerset
- List of scheduled monuments in North Somerset
