= Grade I listed buildings in North Somerset =

North Somerset is a unitary authority in the ceremonial county of Somerset, England. In the United Kingdom, the term listed building refers to a building or other structure officially designated as being of special architectural, historical or cultural significance; Grade I structures are those considered to be "buildings of exceptional interest". Listing was begun by a provision in the Town and Country Planning Act 1947. Once listed, severe restrictions are imposed on the modifications allowed to a building's structure or its fittings. In England, the authority for listing under the Planning (Listed Buildings and Conservation Areas) Act 1990 rests with Historic England, a non-departmental public body sponsored by the Department for Digital, Culture, Media and Sport; local authorities have a responsibility to regulate and enforce the planning regulations.

North Somerset constitutes part of the ceremonial county of Somerset. As a unitary authority, North Somerset is administered independently of the non-metropolitan county of Somerset. Its administrative headquarters are located in the town hall of Weston-super-Mare. North Somerset includes areas that were once part of Somerset before the creation of Avon in 1974.

There are 37 Grade I listed buildings in North Somerset, including the Clifton Suspension Bridge, which joins North Somerset to Bristol and Clevedon Pier. Of the listed buildings, manor houses include Clevedon Court, built in the 14th century, and from the 15th century, Ashton Court and Nailsea Court. Somerset has many religious structures; the largest number are from the Norman or medieval eras. Some of the churches are included in the Somerset towers, a collection of distinctive, mostly spireless Gothic church towers.

== Buildings ==
Name	Location	Type	Completed (Note: The date given is the date used by Historic England as significant for the initial building or that of an important part in the structure's description.)	Grid ref. (Note: The grid reference is based on the British national grid reference system, sometimes known as OSGB36, used by the Ordnance Survey.) Geo-coordinates	Entry number (Note: The "List Entry Number" is a unique number assigned to each listed building and scheduled monument by Historic England.)	Image	Ref.
All Saints Church	Wraxall	Parish Church	12th century	ST4902171969; 51°26′40″N 2°44′06″W	1158033	All Saints Church More images	
Ashton Court mansion and stables	Long Ashton	Country House	15th century	ST5570971837; 51°26′38″N 2°38′19″W	1129841	Ashton Court mansion and stables More images	
Barn circa 50 metres north west of priory church	Kewstoke	Barn	15th century	ST3429566203; 51°23′28″N 2°56′45″W	1129768	Barn circa 50 metres north west of priory church More images	
Church of All Saints	Kingston Seymour	Parish Church	Late 14th century	ST4008566849; 51°23′51″N 2°51′45″W	1313027	Church of All Saints More images	
Church of All Saints	Wrington	Parish Church	13th century	ST4678662718; 51°21′40″N 2°45′56″W	1129227	Church of All Saints More images	
Church of St Andrew	Backwell	Parish Church	12th century	ST4931168330; 51°24′42″N 2°43′49″W	1129810	Church of St Andrew More images	
Church of St Andrew	Banwell	Parish Church	15th century	ST3994959133; 51°19′41″N 2°51′48″W	1320659	Church of St Andrew More images	
Church of St Andrew	Congresbury	Parish Church	13th century	ST4356663762; 51°22′12″N 2°48′44″W	1158046	Church of St Andrew More images	
Church of St Andrew	Clevedon	Parish Church	12th century	ST3937370828; 51°25′59″N 2°52′25″W	1129692	Church of St Andrew More images	
Church of St Bridget	Chelvey	Parish Church	12th century	ST4661868367; 51°24′42″N 2°46′08″W	1129822	Church of St Bridget More images	
Church of St James	Winscombe	Parish Church	13th century	ST4115256653; 51°18′21″N 2°50′44″W	1320684	Church of St James More images	
Church of St John the Baptist	Churchill	Parish Church	12th century	ST4372960239; 51°20′18″N 2°48′33″W	1157891	Church of St John the Baptist More images	
St Mary's Church	Portbury	Parish Church	12th century	ST5029575432; 51°28′32″N 2°43′01″W	1311826	St Mary's Church More images	
Church of St Mary	Yatton	Parish Church	Late 13th century	ST4313165416; 51°23′06″N 2°49′07″W	1137349	Church of St Mary More images	
Church of St Michael	Clapton in Gordano	Parish Church	13th century	ST4677973536; 51°27′30″N 2°46′03″W	1129088	Church of St Michael More images	
Church of St Mary	Christon	Parish Church	12th century	ST3795757287; 51°18′41″N 2°53′29″W	1320668	Church of St Mary More images	
Church of St Michael	Dundry	Parish Church	1484	ST5575266859; 51°23′56″N 2°38′15″W	1129078	Church of St Michael More images	
Church of St Paul	Kewstoke	Parish Church	12th century	ST3349563380; 51°21′56″N 2°57′24″W	1303002	Church of St Paul More images	
Church of St Peter	Portishead	Parish Church	14th century	ST4661776014; 51°28′50″N 2°46′12″W	1291081	Church of St Peter More images	
Church of St Peter & St Paul	Bleadon	Parish Church	1317	ST3414156909; 51°18′27″N 2°56′46″W	1129064	Church of St Peter & St Paul More images	
Church of St Peter & St Paul	Weston in Gordano	Parish Church	c. 1300	ST4438074209; 51°27′51″N 2°48′07″W	1129139	Church of St Peter & St Paul More images	
Church of St Quiricus & St Julietta	Tickenham	Parish Church	11th century	ST4577571446; 51°26′22″N 2°46′54″W	1129121	Church of St Quiricus & St Julietta More images	
Church of The Holy Saviour	Puxton		15th century	ST4066663257; 51°21′55″N 2°51′13″W	1156358	Church of The Holy Saviour More images	
Church of the Holy Trinity	Burrington	Parish Church	15th century	ST4786459332; 51°19′50″N 2°44′59″W	1129183	Church of the Holy Trinity More images	
Church of the Holy Trinity	Nailsea		15th century	ST4661069928; 51°25′33″N 2°46′09″W	1136892	Church of the Holy Trinity More images	
Clevedon Court	Clevedon	Manor House	c. 1330	ST4225971573; 51°26′25″N 2°49′56″W	1136517	Clevedon Court More images	
Clifton Suspension Bridge	Clifton in Bristol to Leigh Woods in North Somerset	Suspension Bridge	1831	ST5647873077; 51°27′18″N 2°37′40″W	1205734	Clifton Suspension Bridge More images	
East cloister wall	Kewstoke	Remaining wall of cloisters.	15th century	ST3435166154; 51°23′26″N 2°56′42″W	1302945	East cloister wall More images	
Infirmary	Kewstoke	Infirmary	15th century	ST3439066143; 51°23′26″N 2°56′40″W	1156326	Infirmary More images	
Nailsea Court	Nailsea	House	15th century	ST4571068201; 51°24′37″N 2°46′55″W	1129104	Nailsea Court More images	
Priory Church	Kewstoke	Priory Church	15th and 16th century	ST3436166171; 51°23′27″N 2°56′41″W	1320691	Priory Church More images	
The pier, including the tollhouse	Clevedon	Pier	1869	ST4008871939; 51°26′36″N 2°51′48″W	1129687	The pier, including the tollhouse More images	
Gatehouse, gates, mounting block and wall running south for circa 20 metres	Kewstoke	Remains of gatehouse	15th century	ST3433166158; 51°23′26″N 2°56′43″W	1129767	Gatehouse, gates, mounting block and wall running south for circa 20 metres More images	
The Refectory and The Vicarage	Congresbury	Vicarage and former Priest's House,	1446	ST4360063797; 51°22′14″N 2°48′42″W	1129203	The Refectory and The Vicarage More images	
Tyntesfield house, servants wing and chapel	Wraxall		1863	ST5064671505; 51°26′25″N 2°42′41″W	1129053	Tyntesfield house, servants wing and chapel More images	
West wall of chapter house range	Kewstoke	Wall	15th century	ST3437266152; 51°23′26″N 2°56′41″W	1320653	West wall of chapter house range More images	

== See also ==
- List of Grade I listed buildings in Somerset
- List of towers in Somerset
- Grade II* listed buildings in North Somerset
