= St Saviour's Church, Puxton =

Church in Somerset, England

Church of The Holy Saviour
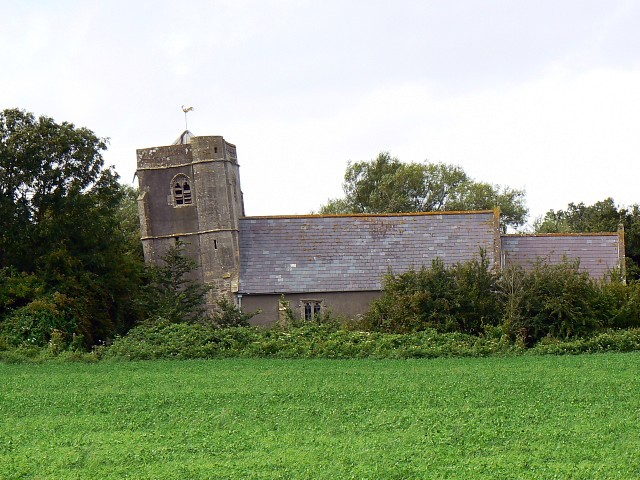

- Location within Somerset

General information
- Location: Puxton, England
- Coordinates: 51.3652°N 2.8536°W
- Completed: 13th century

The Church of The Holy Saviour in Puxton, Somerset, England, dates from the 13th century. It is recorded in the National Heritage List for England as a designated Grade I listed building, and is a redundant church in the care of the Churches Conservation Trust. It was vested in the Trust on 1 August 2002.

It is a small, mostly unaltered medieval church, which was originally a chapel of ease to the Church of St Andrew in Banwell. It was consecrated in 1539.

The leaning tower started to settle towards the southwest while being built, due to the peaty foundations which the church was built upon. This meant that the 15th-century tower was never built as high as was intended. The church is externally Perpendicular in style, with an earlier Saxo-Norman nave.

The interior of the church is very light with a floor of irregular stone flags into which several ledger stones are set. The oak box pews on the north side of the nave are probably early 18th century, and the oak reading desk and pulpit are Jacobean, while the font is Norman. The royal arms of 1751 are over the south door. The 1557 labelled shield of Sir John St Lo's achievement can be seen above the entrance door. The Seyntloo (aka St Loe) family are past owners of Over Langford Manor.

In June 2000 structural problems were found with the roof timbers, the building was closed for some time, and on 2 July 2002, the church was declared redundant by Order in Council.

== See also ==
- List of Grade I listed buildings in North Somerset
- List of towers in Somerset
- List of churches preserved by the Churches Conservation Trust in South West England
