= Clapton Court =

Building in Somerset, England

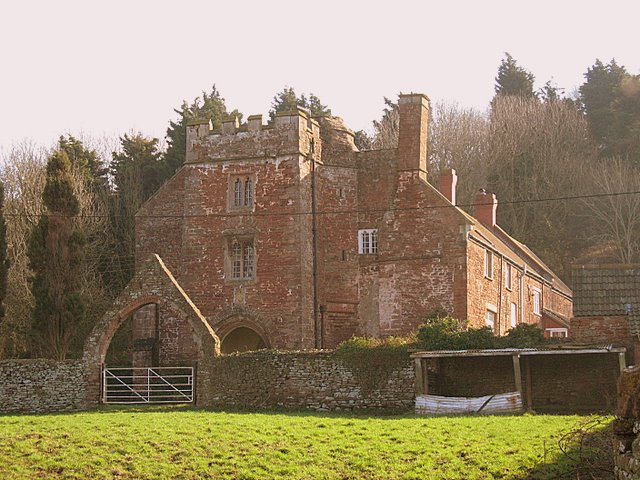
- The north front showing the porch tower

- Location within Somerset
- 51.4579°N 2.7686°W
- Location: Clapton in Gordano, Somerset, England

History
- Built: 15th century

Listed Building – Grade II
- Official name: Clapton Court
- Designated: 20 January 1986
- Reference no.: 1129089

Listed Building – Grade II
- Official name: Entrance archway about 25 metres northwest of Clapton Court
- Designated: 20 January 1986
- Reference no.: 1321002

Clapton Court is a Grade II listed building, in Clapton in Gordano within the English county of Somerset.

Local lords of the manor, the Arthur family originally built on the site. The current porch tower remains from the 15th-century house; the rest was added in the 17th and 19th centuries. It has been owned by many local gentry, but changed from mansion house to farmhouse.

== History ==
The first manor house on the site was built by Sir William Arthur in the 13th century. Sir Thomas Arthur was the member of parliament for Somerset in the 1390s. In the 14th century his descendant Richard Arthur added to the house. He married Alice the daughter of James Berkeley, 1st Baron Berkeley and the entwined coats of arms of the two families appear on the entrance porch. Edward Arthur died in 1592, his daughter married William Winter (or Wynter) of Dyrham Park and the house was passed down in the Winter family. Their tombs can be seen in the neighbouring Church of St Michael.

Subsequent owners included: James Davis, who was a mine owner in the Victorian era, Sir Edward Payson Wills, 1st Baronet of Hazelwood & Clapton in-Gordano, of the Wills baronets, who was a director of the family business, WD & HO Wills. In the late 19th century the court was owned by his son Sir Ernest Wills, 3rd Baronet, who was a director of the Imperial Tobacco Company, (formally W.D.& H.O. Wills) the tobacco importers. It was then bought by Lady Smyth of Ashton Court and subsequently by Con Stevens. During the centuries the house moved from being a mansion house to a farmhouse and had various renovations and extensions.

In 2009 planning permission was gained to demolish some of the farm buildings and convert others into holiday homes and offices.

== Architecture ==
The house has red sandstone walls, which are supported by buttresses in the northeast corner. The oldest part of the building is the 15th-century three-storey porch tower at the north front of the house. The rest of the building is of two storeys and dates from the 17th and 19th centuries.

A 13th-century wooden screen from the house has been in the Church of St Michael.

The archway entrance was built in the late 17th or early 18th century.

== Bibliography ==
- Cooke, Robert (1957). West Country Houses. Batsford.
