= Holy Trinity Church, Nailsea =

Church in Somerset, England

Coordinates: 51°25′32.93″N 2°46′09.42″W

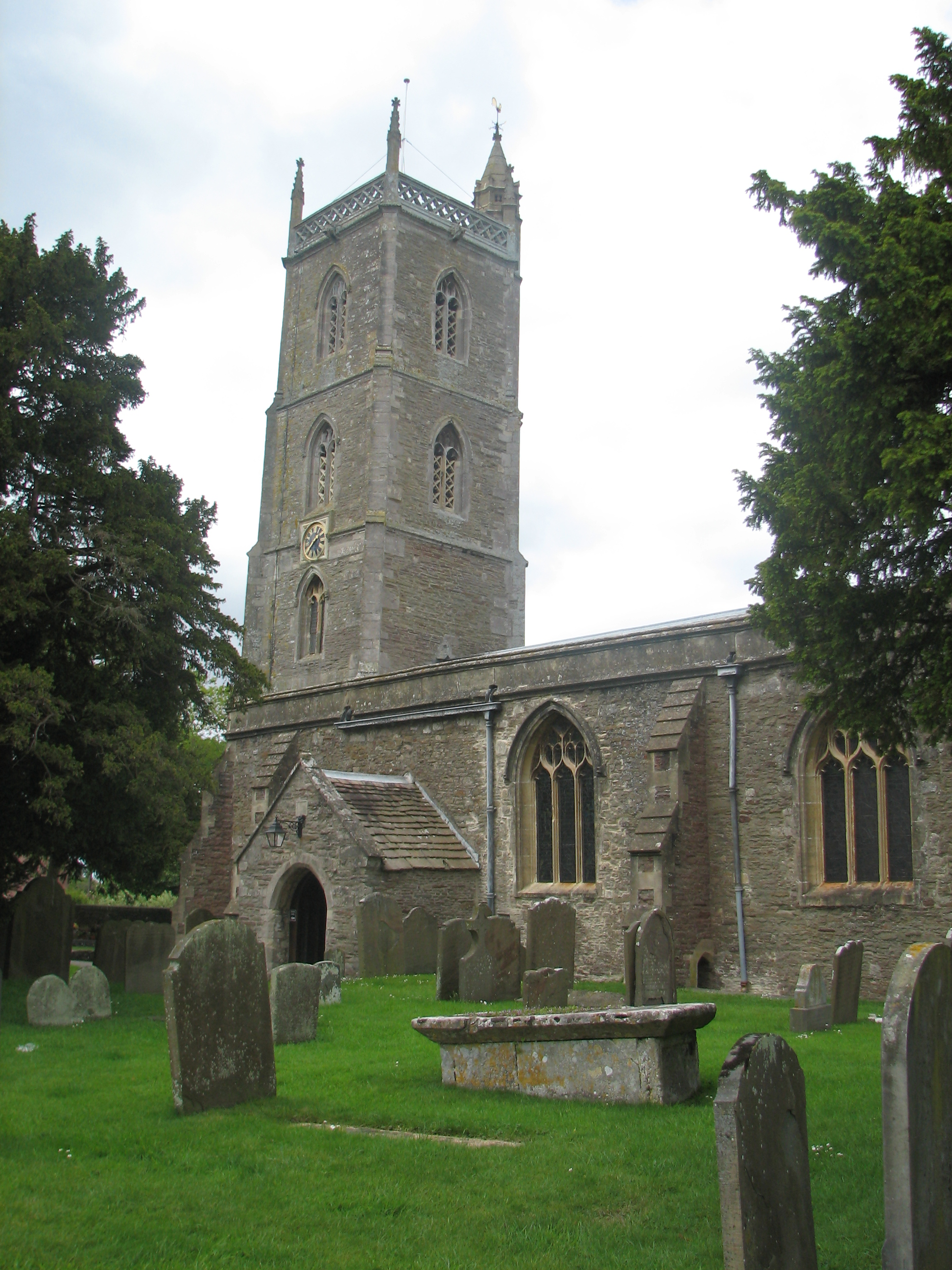
- Holy Trinity Church, Nailsea
- Holy Trinity Church, Nailsea
- Denomination: Church of England
- Churchmanship: Open Evangelical/Charismatic
- Website: www.htnailsea.org.uk

History
- Dedication: Holy Trinity

Administration
- Province: Canterbury
- Diocese: Bath and Wells
- Archdeaconry: Bath
- Deanery: Portishead
- Parish: Nailsea

Clergy
- Rector: James Packman

Holy Trinity Church is an Anglican Church in Nailsea, Somerset, England. It dates from the 15th century and is a Grade I listed building. It features a tower with 6 Bells, a cemetery, and a community centre called "The Trinity Centre".

== History and architecture ==
The porch dates from 1712 and was restored in 1861 at the expense of Mr C.E. Evans of Nailsea Court. The four stage tower has a pointed arched west door with two and three-light windows at each level. It is supported with diagonal buttresses and surmounted with a parapet, pinnacles, spire and weathervane.

The Church was significantly refurbished in 2003/2004 to make it more modern and flexible in its usage. The changes included the removal of the pews, being replaced with single movable chairs and the removal of the balcony. New heating and lighting was installed along with a new wooden floor and the addition of a Baptistry.

== Fittings ==
The octagonal stone pulpit stands on a pedestal against the north wall. It was probably donated by the Mede family who lived at Failand Hill and carries their family crest. The Medes were also associated with St Mary Redcliffe, with Thomas Mede holding office as High Sheriff of Bristol and Member of Parliament for Bristol in the 15th century.

The font has various devices on its side panels including a Tudor rose and the five Holy Wounds. A specific pew was set aside for the owners of Nailsea Court.

=== Organ ===
The church has a two manual pipe organ by Sweetland Organ Company.

== See also ==
- List of Grade I listed buildings in North Somerset
- List of towers in Somerset
- List of ecclesiastical parishes in the Diocese of Bath and Wells

== Gallery ==
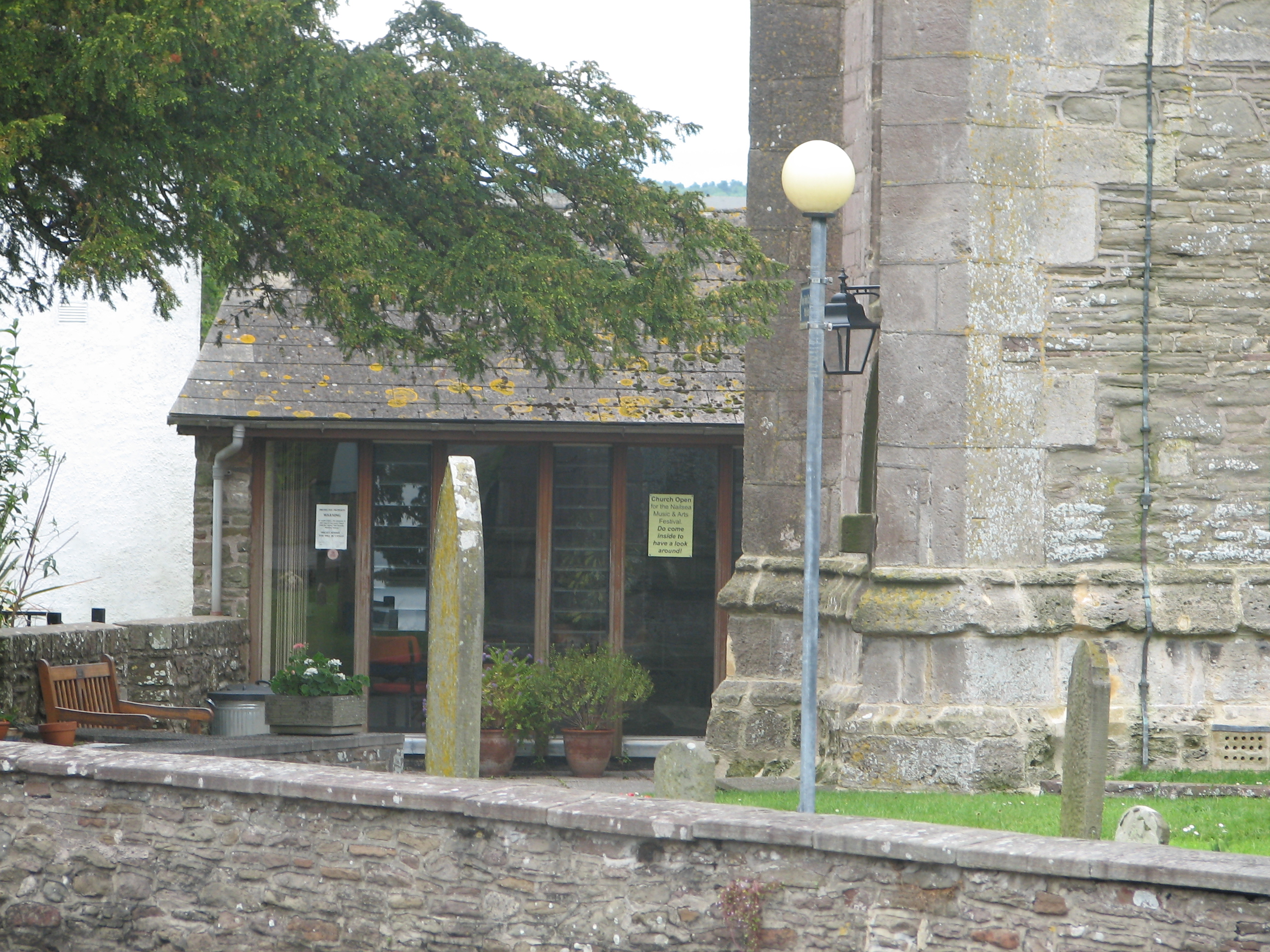
The Trinity Centre

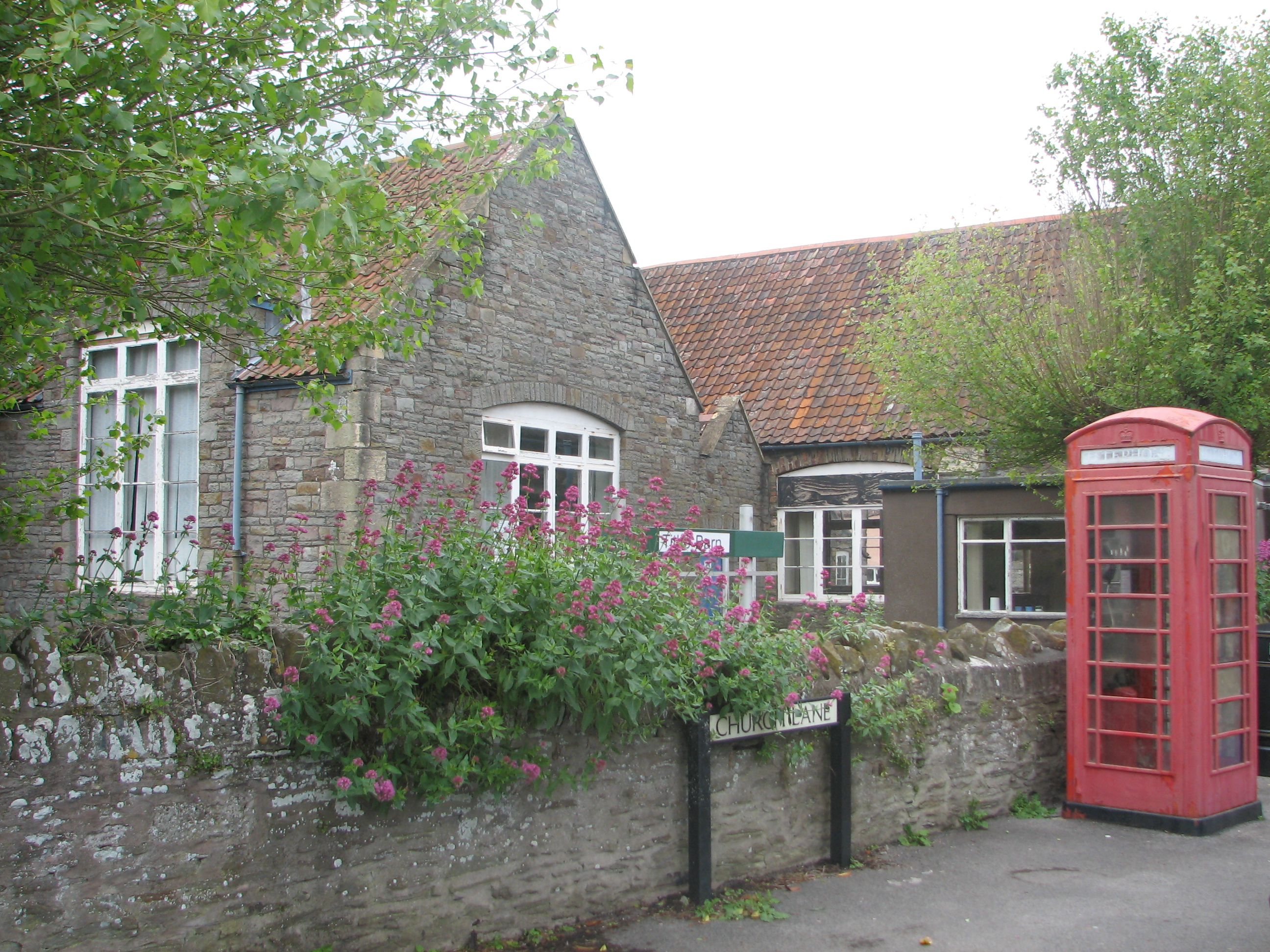
The Tithe Barn

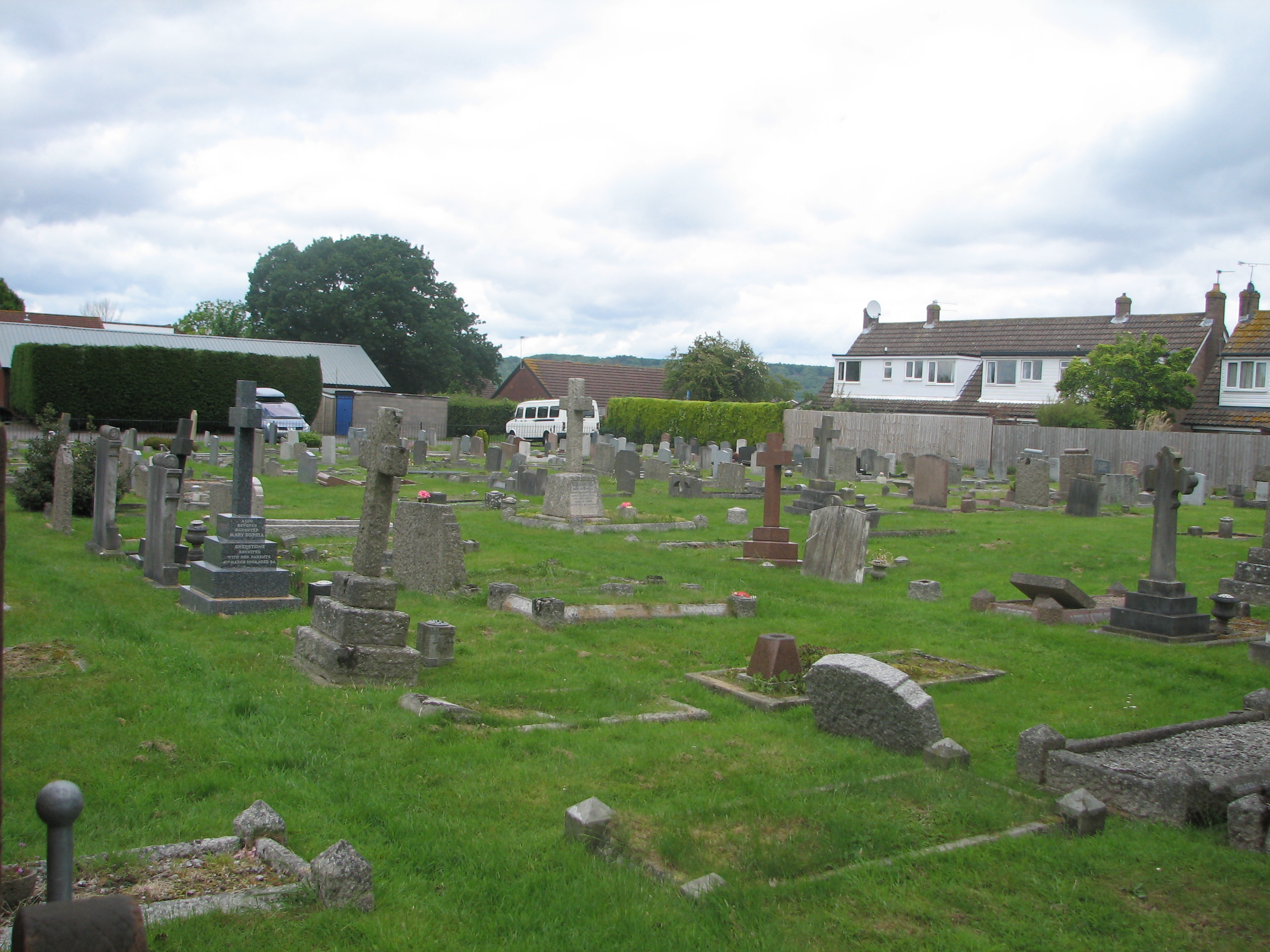
The Cemetery

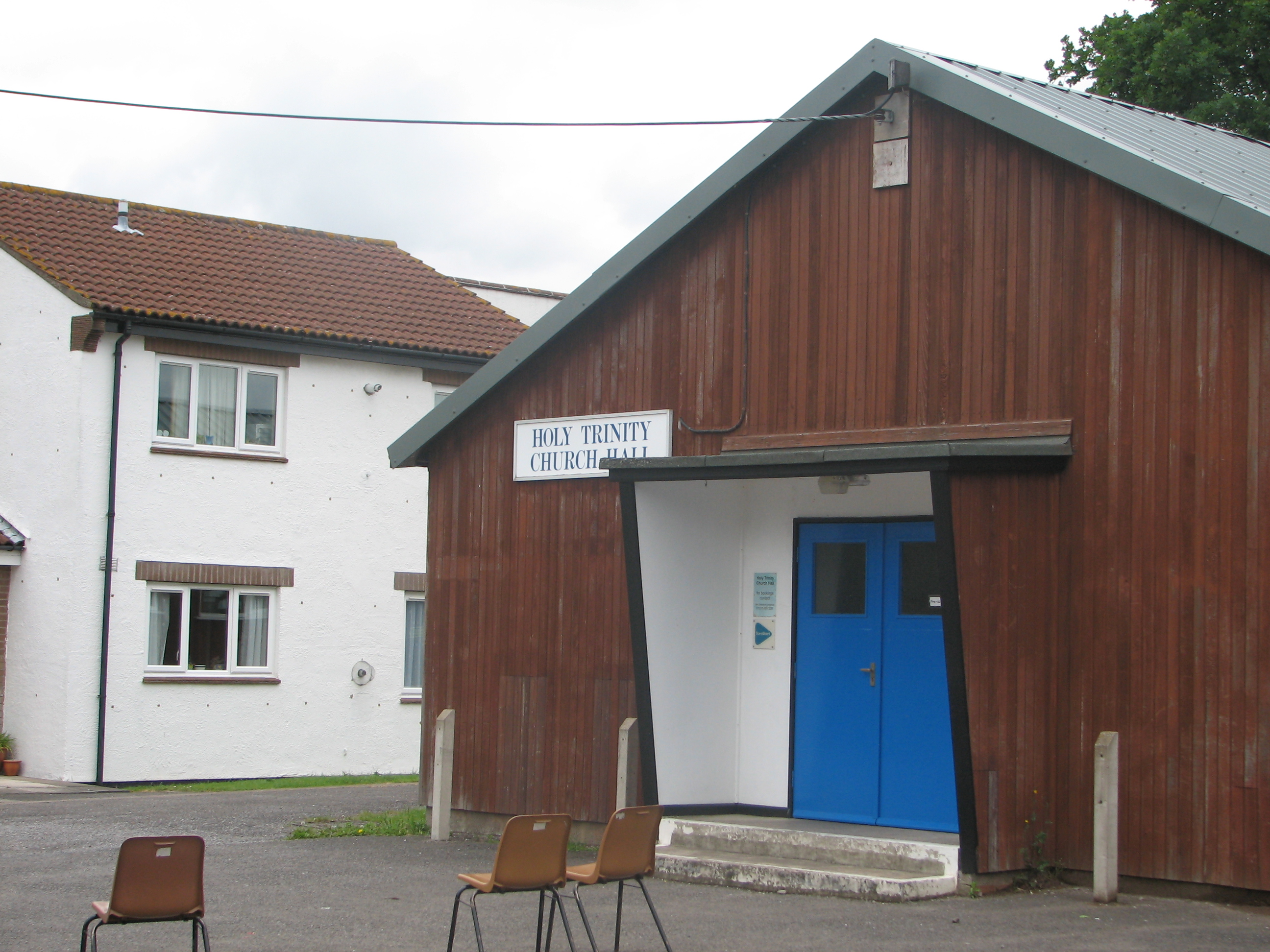
The Church Hall
