= Woodspring Priory =

Grade I listed priory in North Somerset, United Kingdom

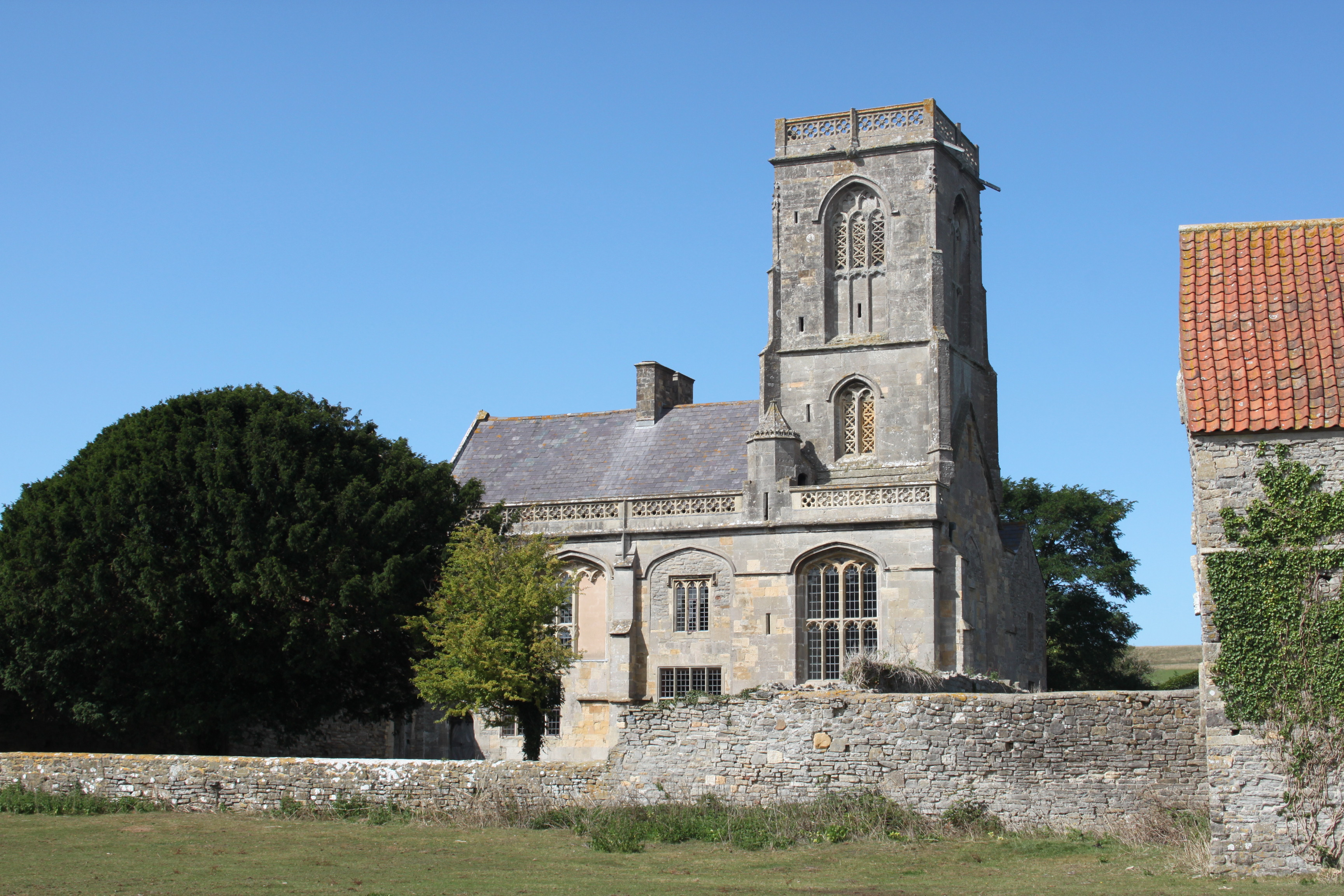
- The Priory Church from the south

- Location within Somerset
- Former names: Worsprynge, Worspring

General information
- Architectural style: Gothic
- Location: Kewstoke, England
- Coordinates: 51°23′27″N 2°56′42″W
- Completed: 15th century

Woodspring Priory (originally Worsprynge or Worspring) is a former Augustinian priory. It is near the scenic limestone promontory of Sand Point and Middle Hope, owned by the National Trust, beside the Severn Estuary about 3 miles (5 km) north-east of Weston-super-Mare, within the English unitary authority of North Somerset. Many of the buildings are Grade I listed, and the whole site is scheduled as an ancient monument.

The priory was founded, by William de Courtney, in the early 13th century, and dedicated to Thomas Becket. The small community built a church and monastic lodgings during the next hundred years. They were Victorine Canons who were influenced by the Cistercians who emphasised manual labour and self-sufficiency so that the clerks who had taken holy orders worked on the farm, as well as providing clergy for surrounding churches. Despite endowments of land the priory was not wealthy until the 15th century when further building work, including the current priory church, infirmary and barn was undertaken. It was dissolved in 1536 and then owned by local noblemen and leased to local farmers. In 1968 the priory and adjoining land of Middle Hope was purchased by the National Trust as part of Project Neptune. The following year the priory was taken over by the Landmark Trust who spent 20 years on restoration work, and now rent out the farmhouse as holiday accommodation.

The surviving buildings include the priory church, which was a 15th-century replacement for the earlier 13th-century structure, an infirmary, a barn and a 16th-century prior's lodging, which was converted into a farmhouse. The whole site was arranged around a central cloister from which only the east wall and west wall of the chapter house remain, the sacristy, refectory, chapter house, lady chapel and parlour having been demolished. The former district council and parliamentary constituency both took their name from the priory.

== History ==
=== Foundation ===
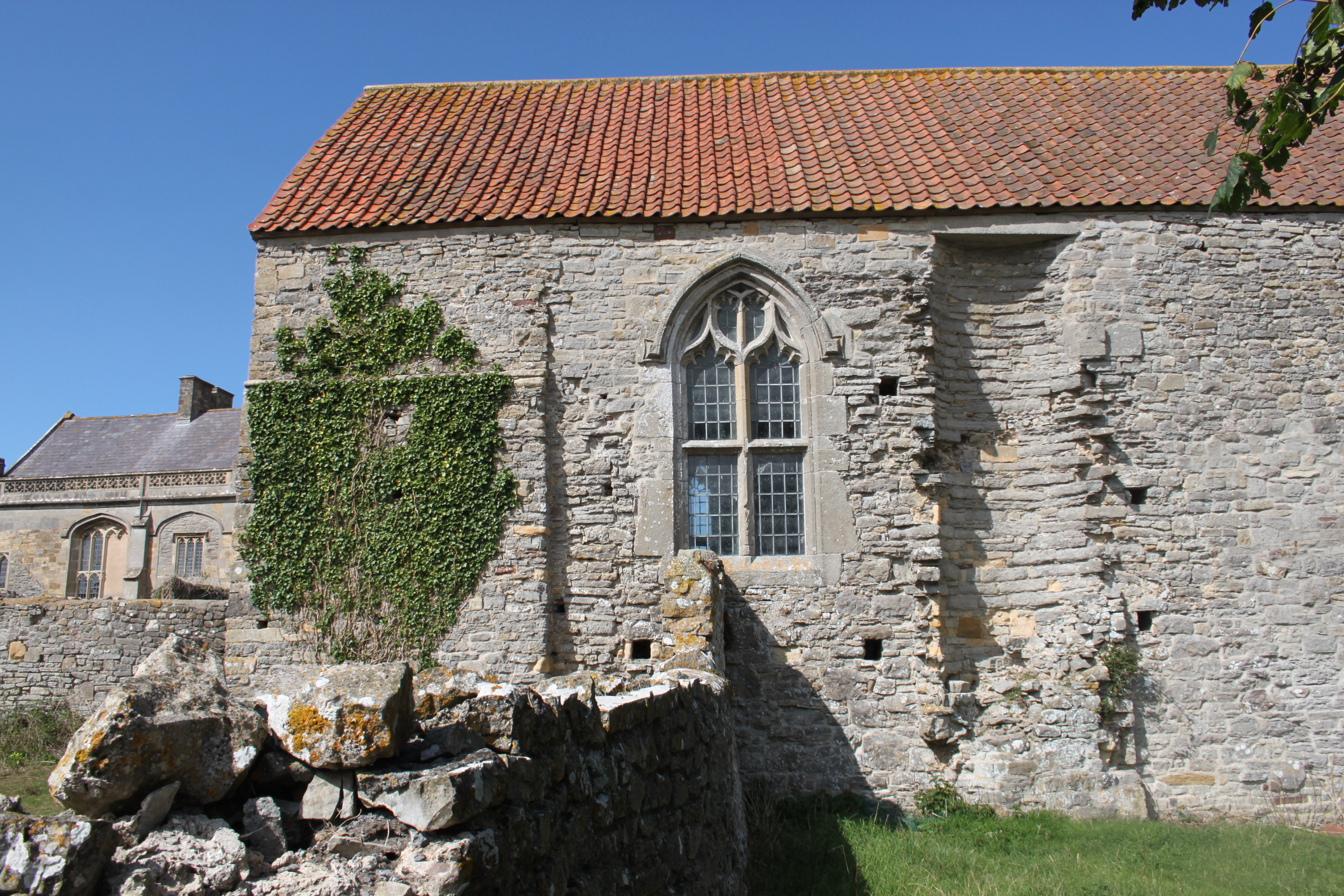
The infirmary from the south

The priory was founded in the early 13th century, and dedicated to Thomas Becket. The founder, William de Courtney, was a grandson of Reginald Fitzurse, one of Becket's murderers. In 1849 a reliquary was found in St Paul's Church, Kewstoke that was believed to have come originally from the priory and to contain the blood of Thomas Becket. It is believed that it was moved to St Paul's for safe keeping at the time of the dissolution of the monasteries and is now in the Museum of Somerset in Taunton. The first building had been completed by 1242 as it is described in a letter to Jocelin of Wells. In 1283 John de Botetourt, 1st Baron Botetourt, the warden of the Forest of Dean was instructed to deliver ten oaks from the forest to the Prior of Woodspring. The foundation was confirmed by Edward II in 1325. It was home to a small community of Victorine Canons. The Victorine order were founded at the Abbey of St. Victor, Paris and founded St Augustine's Abbey in Bristol which became Bristol Cathedral. Members of the priory were influenced by the Cistercians who emphasised manual labour and self-sufficiency so that the clerks who had taken holy orders worked on the farm. The priory also provided the clergy for the local parish Church of St Paul, Kewstoke.

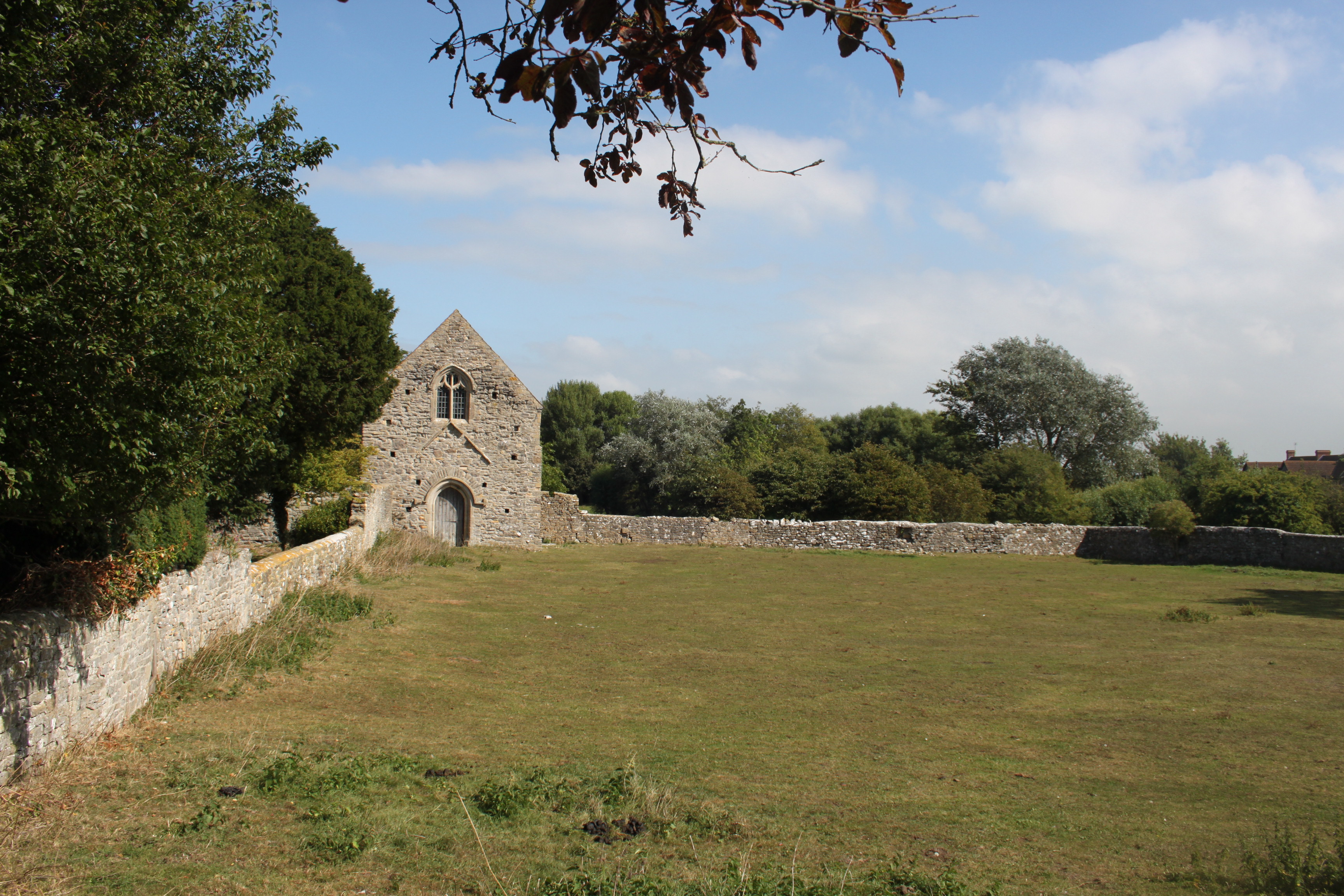
The site of the cloister from the west

The priory, along with other religious houses such as Glastonbury Abbey and Wells Cathedral, was responsible for draining some of the mudflats and salt marshes of the Somerset Levels. William de Courtenay gave the manors of Woodspring, Worle and Locking to the priory, however it was not rich for most of its existence, with William Button giving a legacy of 210 marks in 1277. In 1317, although the first church buildings were complete, however it had not been consecrated and Bishop Drokensford therefore fined them 20 shillings. Further financial difficulties arose when, during the outbreak of the Black Death in 1348 they had to appoint successive clergy to local churches, and the church suffered a fire in the priory church. In the 15th and early 16th centuries an unknown benefactor enabled expansion and new building work to be undertaken. There is some speculation that some of the funding may have come from smugglers who were able to land their craft close to the priory and avoid customs duties. The priory church and the great barn were constructed along with a part of the prior's lodging.

=== Dissolution ===
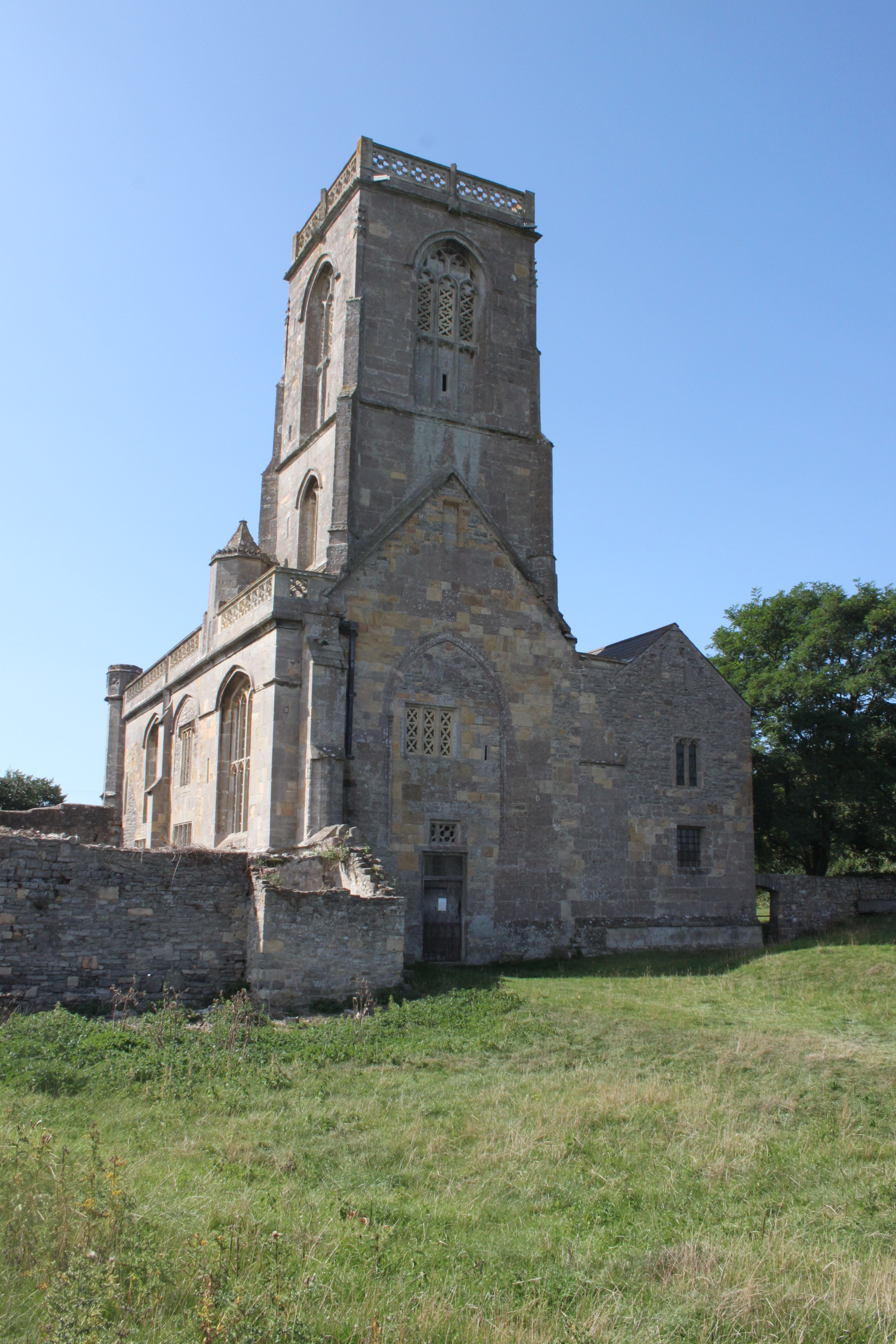
The priory church and farmhouse

In 1536 Henry VIII, through a series of administrative and legal processes disbanded monasteries, priories, convents and friaries in England. He appropriated their income, disposed of their assets, and provided for their former members and functions. He was given the authority to do this in England and Wales by the Act of Supremacy, passed by Parliament in 1534, which made him Supreme Head of the Church in England, thus separating England from Papal authority, and by the First Suppression Act (1536) and the Second Suppression Act (1539). Roger Tormenton had been elected prior of Woodspring in 1525 and in 1534 he acknowledged the king's supremacy, having already sold a third of the prior's property to Thomas Horner of Mells Manor, but on 27 September 1536 the community was disbanded with revenues of £87 2s 11d. Some of the priory's treasures were distributed to nearby churches. In addition to the reliquary going to St Paul's in Kewstoke, the carved misericords went to St Martin's in Worle and the sculpted pulpit to the Church of St Lawrence in Wick St. Lawrence.

After the dissolution of the monasteries, the priory was granted to William St Loe and leased to Edward Fetyplace of Donnington, Berkshire who converted it into a farmhouse. The chancel was demolished, a second floor was constructed in the north aisle and large windows were bricked up. In 1566 it was sold to William Carr the MP for Bristol who completed the conversion from priory to manor house. In the late 17th century it was inherited by the Pigott family who owned it for 200 years, including the Smyth-Pigotts who were related to the Smyth family who owned Ashton Court. In the 17th century it was owned by Ralph Hopton who was a Royalist commander in the English Civil War.

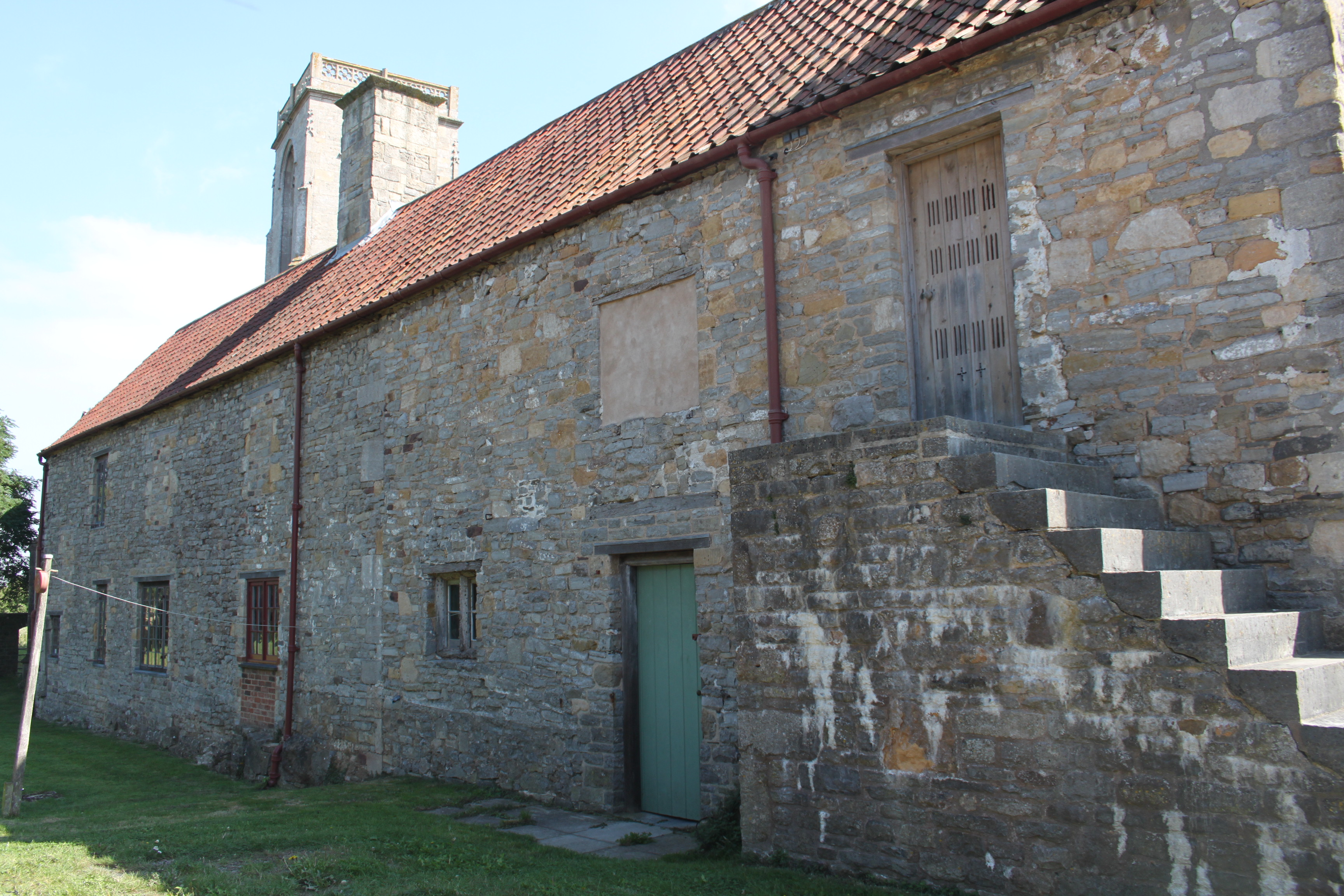
The farmhouse range

During the post medieval period until the early 18th century it served as a hospital for the local population. In 1829 repairs were carried out to the church. Excavations in 1885 found floor tiles with coats of arms and a pavement from the 14th century beneath which were several coffins. According to the findings of later resistivity and gradiometer surveys there may also have been a formal Tudor garden and there may have been fish ponds.

The farmhouse was damaged by fire in 1897. In 1926 the owner, Somerset cricketer Major Vernon Hill, offered the priory for sale to the local council, but the council did not purchase it. Major and Mrs Hill continued to own the priory until 1928, when it was bought by the Agricultural Land Company and rented to local farmers. In 1932 it was the venue for Alan Cobham's Flying Circus providing aviation displays. In 1968 the priory and adjoining land of Middle Hope was purchased by the National Trust for Places of Historic Interest or Natural Beauty as part of Project Neptune.

=== Restoration ===
The decaying priory was taken over by the Landmark Trust in 1969. In the subsequent 20 years restoration work was undertaken. Initially this was to the church and infirmary with the removal of ivy and removal and replacement of the roofs. The infirmary walls had to be held in place by a concrete ring beam.

The church is now a small museum with photographs and information about the history of the priory and its renovation by the Landmark Trust, while the attached lodging house is rented out as holiday accommodation.

== Architecture ==
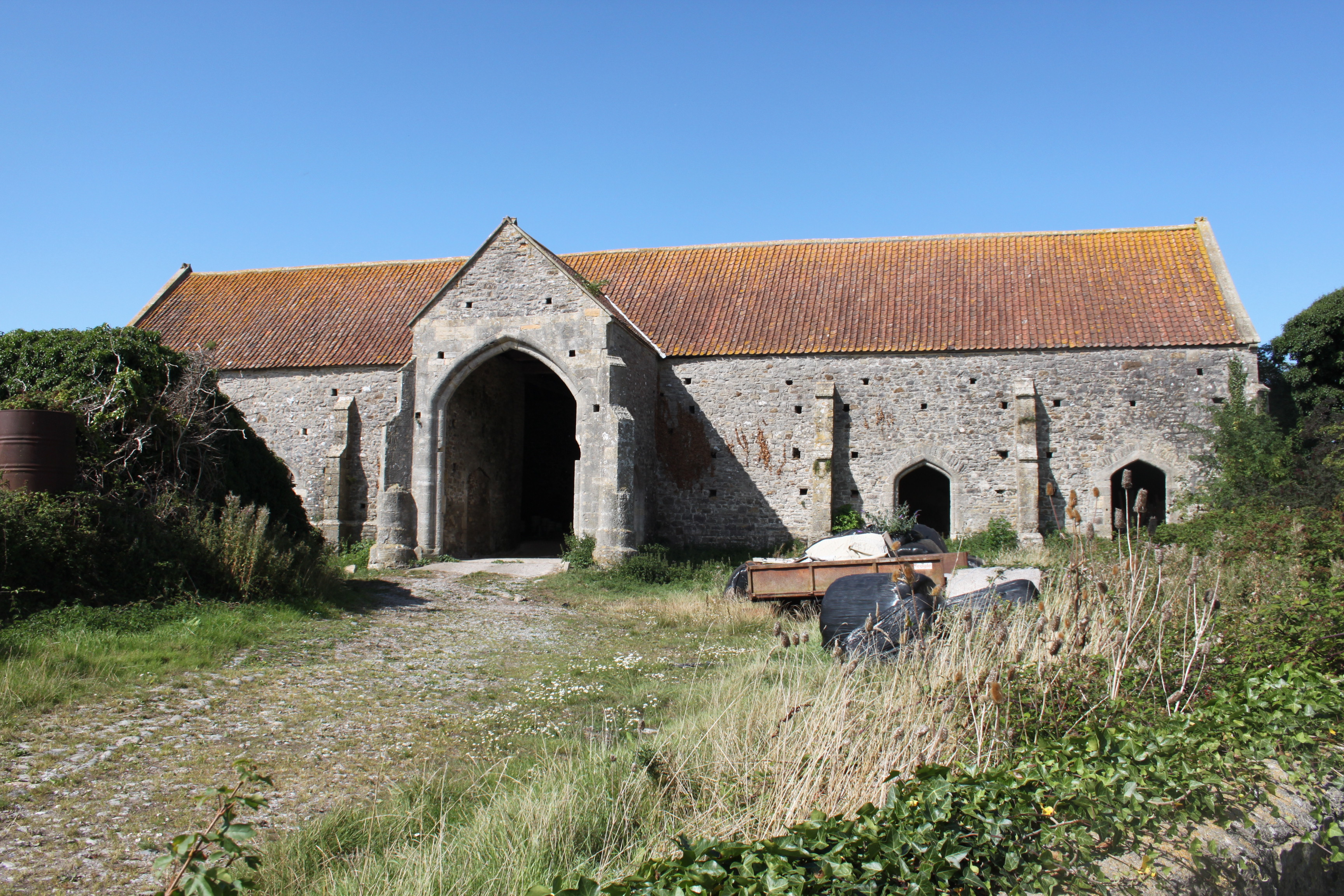
The barn

The 15th-century barn, east cloister wall, farmhouse range, gatehouse, gates and mounting block, infirmary, and west wall are all listed buildings. It has been suggested that the obvious burst of both new build and reconstruction which took place in the 15th century was paid for at least in part by revenues accruing from mineral mining (both lead and calamine) on Worlebury and Worle Hill.

The whole site was arranged around a central cloister from which only the east wall and west wall of the chapter house remain. The sacristy, refectory, chapter house, lady chapel and parlour having been demolished. The gatehouse, gates, mounting block with six steps and west wall can also be seen attached to the farmhouse.

The original 13th-century church no longer stands, however the current church which is in perpendicular style has a two bay nave, north aisle and two stage crossing tower, which is 65 feet (20 m) high. The tower stands on the 13th-century base from which the short stair turret and traceried windows can still be seen. The quatrefoil parapet is from 1829. The west front includes both triassic stone from the 13th-century building and Dundry stone from the 15th. The main door is partially blocked up and serves as a window and the large upper windows have also been blocked up.

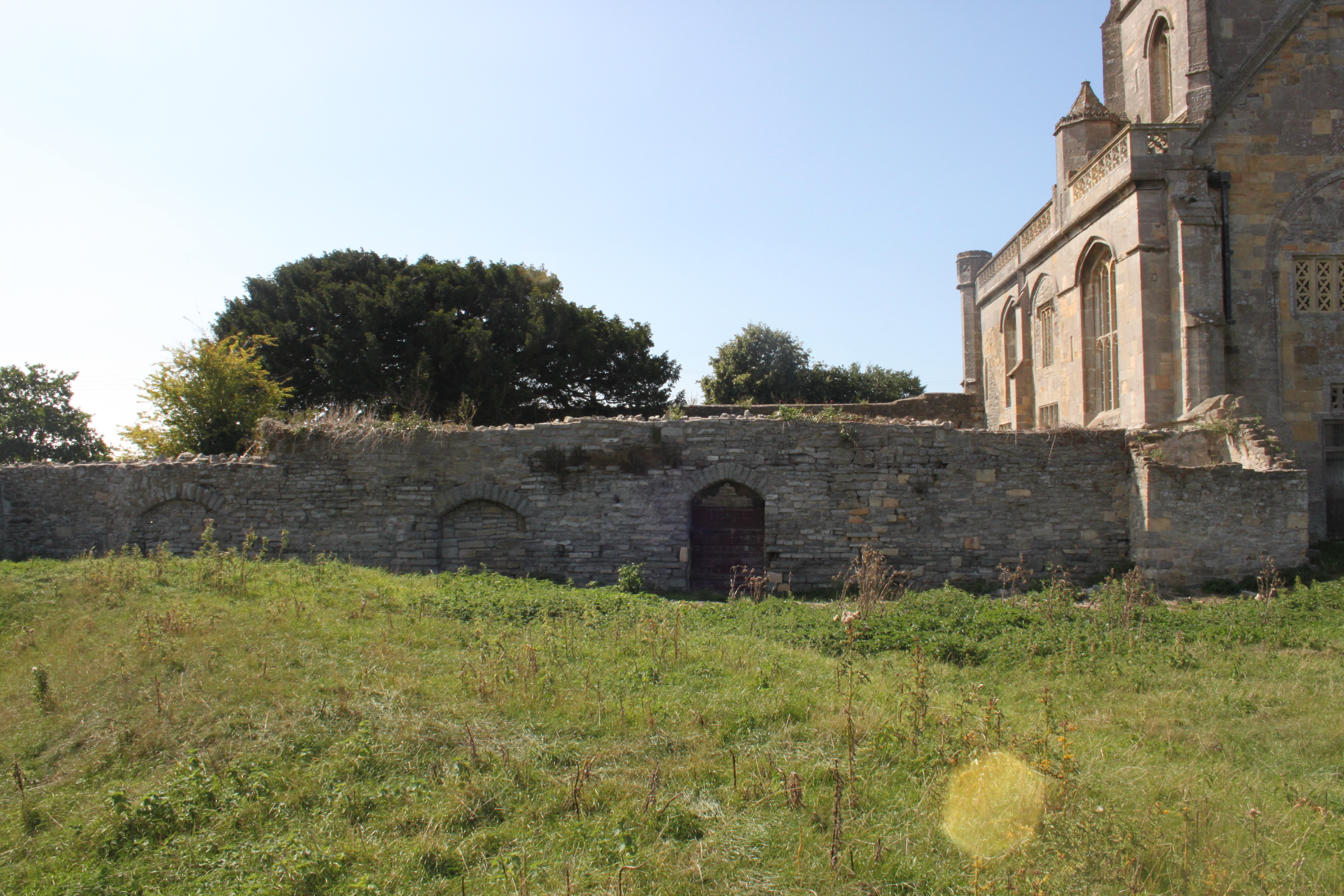
The west wall of the cloister and site of the fish ponds

The 16th-century prior's lodging which was converted into a two-storey farmhouse had major alterations and extensions in 1701. Inside the building are massive beams. The pentice was added in the 19th century. The 15th-century barn, which is approximately 50 metres (160 ft) north west of the church has seven bays supported by buttresses with diagonal buttresses at the corners. It has a collar beam roof. It has a well at the eastern end. The old infirmary was built in the 15th century and has an arch braced collar beam roof. The south wall shows the site where a stair turret was included, which would have linked the ground floor infirmary chapel with the infirmarer's quarters, which have both been demolished.

== Legacy ==
The priory gave its name to the Woodspring District of the former county of Avon, which existed from 1974 to 1996 but is now known as North Somerset. Between 1983 and 2010 the parliamentary constituency known as Woodspring also took its name from the priory.

== See also ==
- Grade I listed buildings in North Somerset
- List of monastic houses in Somerset
