= St Peter's Church, Portishead =

Church in Somerset, England

Church of St Peter
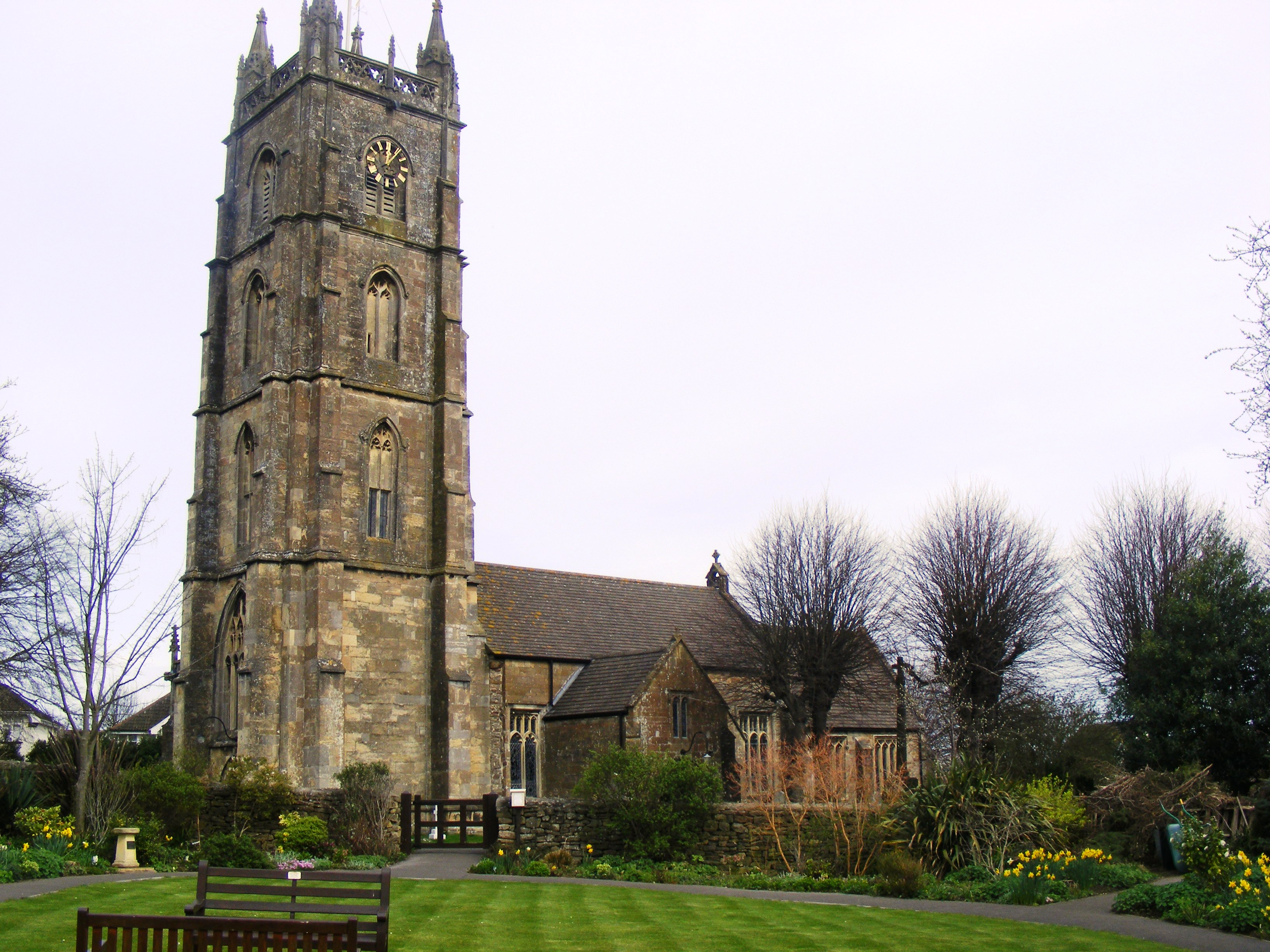

- Location within Somerset

General information
- Location: Portishead, England
- Coordinates: 51.4806°N 2.7702°W
- Completed: 1320

The Norman Church of St Peter in Portishead, Somerset, England, was built in 1320, on the site of a previous church, and rebuilt in the 14th and 15th centuries in the Perpendicular Gothic style. In 1952 it was made a Grade I listed building.

The vestry was added in 1828. The church was altered in 1978–1979. It also has a new garden developed at the Millennium.

The churchyard contains the war graves of three Royal Navy sailors and an airman of World War II.

The building is located between Church Road North and Church Road South in the centre of Portishead with the four-stage tower rising to 94 feet (29 m), making a prominent landmark, with its set back buttresses and a pierced parapet.

It has strong links with Christian primary schools such as St Peter's C of E.

== Current Clergy ==
As of April 2025 the team ministry consists of Reverend Rob Eastwood Dewing (Team Rector), Revd Tonya Nixon (Team Pastor), Revd Mark Fuller (Team Pilgrim) and Revd Lindsay Smith (Assistant Curate).

== See also ==
- List of Grade I listed buildings in North Somerset
- List of towers in Somerset
- List of ecclesiastical parishes in the Diocese of Bath and Wells
