= The Vicarage, Congresbury =

Building in Somerset, England

The Vicarage
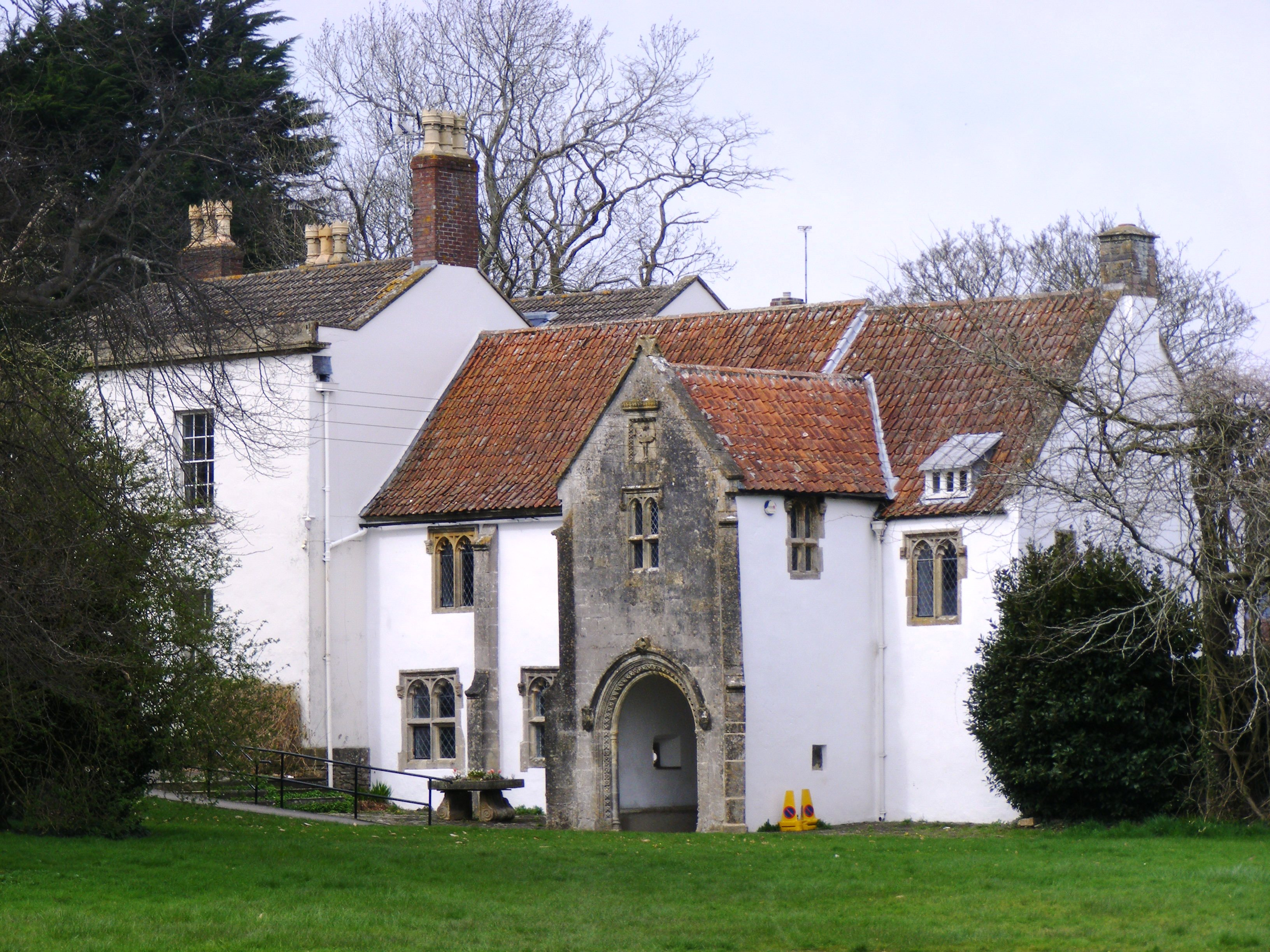

- Location within Somerset

General information
- Location: Congresbury, England
- Coordinates: 51.3701°N 2.8122°W
- Completed: 1446

The Vicarage (which is also known as The Refectory) in Congresbury, Somerset, England, includes an early 19th-century vicarage and former Priests House from around 1446. It has been designated as a Grade I listed building.

The eastern range comprising the Refectory was built by executors of Bishop Thomas Beckington of Wells whose heraldic devices and those of the Poulteney family are on the porch. There are also carved faces on the window surrounds. The specific year of construction is not known but thought to be between 1440 and 1470, although the porch which may be slightly later than other parts of the building has been dated to 1465.

In 1823 the refectory was found to be in a bad state of repair and moneys allocated for the construction of the new vicarage. Major repairs were carried out to the refectory in the 1950s following the discovery of deathwatch beetle .

The two-storey limewashed stone of the vicarage has a tiled hipped roof and Greek Doric distyle porch. The refectory is supported by buttresses and pantile roofs. The hall and rooms above have original fireplaces and ceilings.

The building is now used for church and community functions, with its current Vicar being Rev. Matthew Thompson. In 2016 plans were published for the development of 26 homes on the land belonging to the church. As part of the proposal the vicarage would become a common house providing a communal kitchen and dining room and office space.

== See also ==
- List of Grade I listed buildings in North Somerset
