= Sand Point and Middle Hope =

Headland in Somerset, England

Middle Hope
- Site of Special Scientific Interest
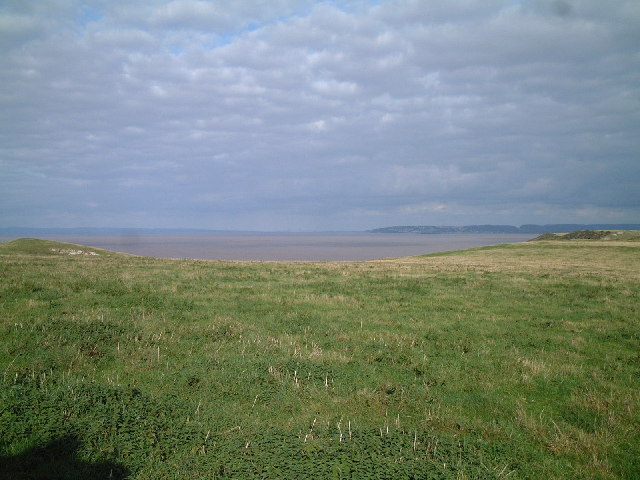

- Location within Somerset
- Location of Middle Hope.
- Area of search: Avon
- Grid reference: ST325662
- Coordinates: 51.3898°N 2.969°W
- Interest: Biological
- Area: 84.1 hectares (208 acres)
- Notification date: 1952

Sand Point in Somerset, England, is the peninsula stretching out from Middle Hope, an 84.1-hectare (208-acre) biological and geological Site of Special Scientific Interest. It lies to the north of the village of Kewstoke, and the stretch of coastline called Sand Bay north of the town of Weston-super-Mare. On a clear day it commands views over Flat Holm, of the Bristol Channel, South Wales, Clevedon, the Second Severn Crossing and the Severn Bridge.

Some sources treat Sand Point as the lower limit of the Severn Estuary and its boundary with the Bristol Channel, although definitions of these areas vary and are often ambiguous. The Living Levels Partnership use a definition that draws a line between Sand Point and Lavernock Point in South Wales.

Middle Hope is a sequence of carboniferous limestone with unusual geological features including a Pleistocene-aged fossil cliff and as a result has been designated as a regionally important geological site. The underlying geology and soil types support scarce plants such as the smallflower buttercup, honewort, Cheddar pink and Somerset hair grass. Human use of the sites is shown by a bowl barrow and disc barrow from late Neolithic or Bronze Age and the site of a likely motte-and-bailey castle. Woodspring Priory, a former Augustinian priory which was founded in the early 13th century, sits just inland of the rocky promontory. The priory and surrounding land is owned by the National Trust and is a popular place for walking.

== Geology ==
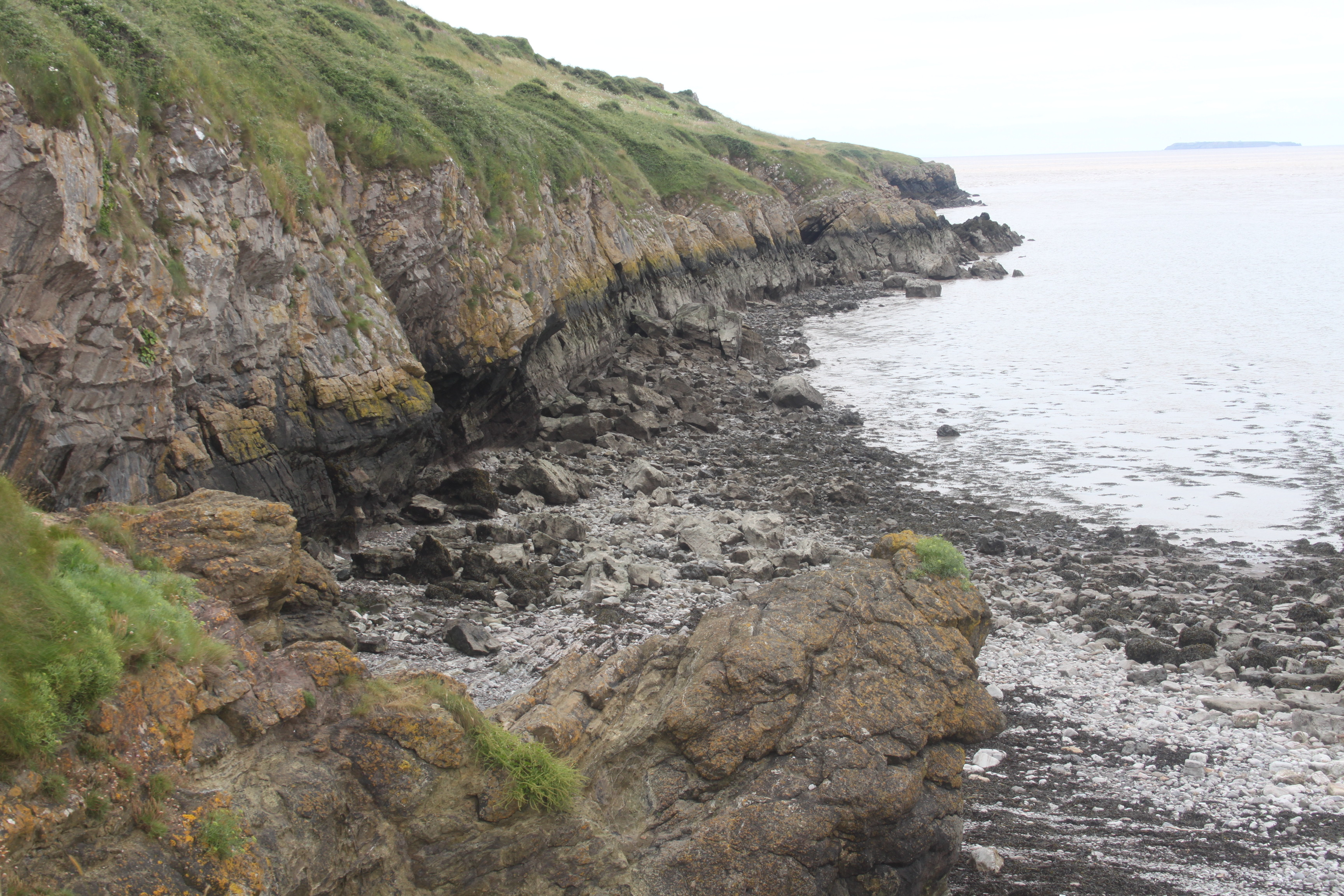
The cliffs and rocky beach at Middle Hope

At Middle Hope a sequence of carboniferous limestone is exposed, which includes thick volcanic tuffs and lavas, demonstrating Tournaisian carbonate sections. The site contains a Pleistocene-aged fossil cliff and shore platform. These features have led to the designation of Middle Hope as a regionally important geological site (RIGS).

The raised beach of wave-cut platforms has been created by changes in sea level of the Bristol Channel since the Quaternary period. The arrangement of volcanic and sedimentary rocks, including the Black Rock Limestone, illustrates the events of 350 million years ago. The strata have been tilted and compressed during the variscan orogeny.

== Flora ==
Among scarce plants found on Sand Point are smallflower buttercup, and honewort. The range of soils at the site support various flora and fauna. The calcareous grassland is dominated by Festuca species and Dactylis glomerata, while the scrub towards the west of the site is dominated by hawthorn (Crataegus monogyna) and blackthorn (Prunus spinosa), while that to the east consists of common gorse (Ulex europaeus) and bramble (Rubus fruticosus agg). Less common plants include the cheddar pink (Dianthus gratianopolitanus) and Somerset hair grass (Koeleria vallesiana).

== History ==
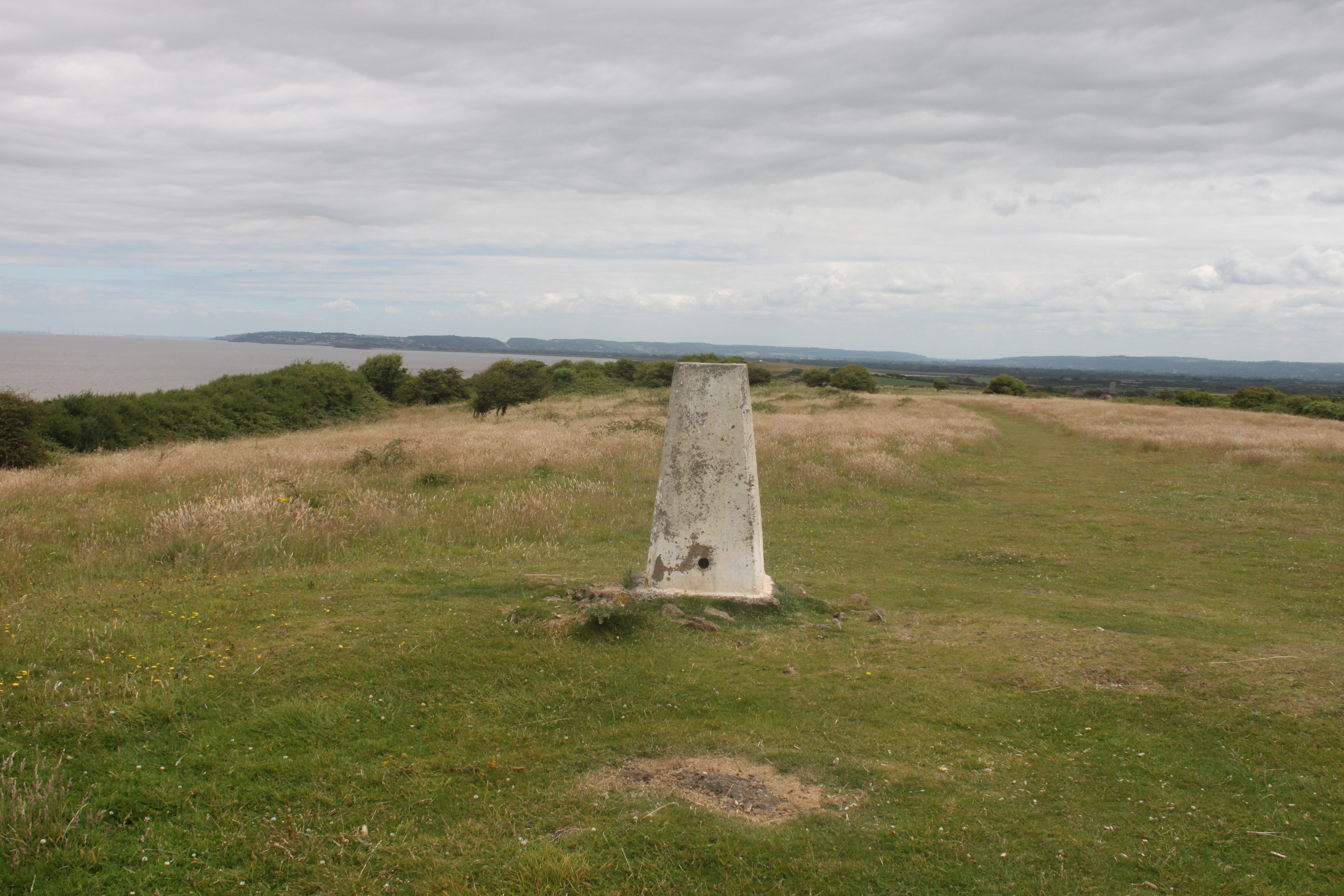
The triangulation station and site of the bowl barrow and disc barrow

Evidence of early human occupation is provided by a bowl barrow and disc barrow from the late Neolithic or Bronze Age that have been identified on the higher ground. The bowl barrow is 10 metres (33 ft) in diameter and approximately 0.5 metres (1 ft 8 in) high. Slightly west of the bowl barrow is a disc barrow surrounded by a bank and ditch which enclose an area about 8 metres (26 ft) across. These are situated at the highest point where the Ordnance Survey have constructed a triangulation station.

A motte-and-bailey castle may have been constructed after the Norman Conquest. The site is known as Castle Mound or Castle Batch and can be seen as a 2 metres (6 ft 7 in) high mound which is approximately 30 metres (98 ft) in diameter and marked by a ditch on the landward eastern edge. The mound was damaged by the construction of a building during World War II. The medieval date for the construction is in doubt with some sources suggesting that the mound may have been a watchtower constructed in the 16th century. The walls of the sheep fold were built by prisoners from the Napoleonic Wars. Hope Cove on the northern coast had a reputation for smuggling as it was "well away from the men of HM Customs and Excise".

Woodspring Priory was an Augustinian priory. It was founded by William de Courtney, in the early 13th century, and dedicated to Thomas Becket. The small community built a church and monastic lodgings during the next hundred years. They were Victorine Canons who were influenced by the Cistercians emphasis on manual labour and self-sufficiency. As a result, the clerks who had taken holy orders worked on the farm, as well as providing clergy for surrounding churches. Despite endowments of land the priory was not wealthy until the 15th century when further building work, including the current priory church, infirmary and barn was undertaken. It was dissolved in 1536 and then owned by local noblemen and leased to local farmers. In 1969 the priory was taken over by the Landmark Trust who spent 20 years on restoration work, and since the 1990s have rented out the farmhouse as holiday accommodation. The surviving buildings include the priory church, which was a 15th-century replacement for the earlier 13th century structure, infirmary, barn and 16th century prior's lodging which was converted into a farmhouse. The whole site was arranged around a central cloister from which only the east wall and west wall of the chapter house remain, the sacristy, refectory, chapter house, lady chapel and parlour having been demolished.

Because of the biological and geological interest the site was designated as a Site of Special Scientific Interest in 1952. In 1968 the priory and adjoining land of Middle Hope was purchased by the National Trust for Places of Historic Interest or Natural Beauty as part of Project Neptune.

During World War II weapons were tested at Sand Point, in association with the base at Birnbeck Pier which was commissioned as "HMS Birnbeck" by the Admiralty as part of the Department of Miscellaneous Weapons Development (DMWD) for research into new weapons. To support this buildings were constructed at St Thomas Head, east of Middle Hope. Some of these have since been removed and the site is now used by QinetiQ as an explosives and shock test facility.
