= St Mary's Church, Christon =

Church in Somerset, England

Church of St Mary
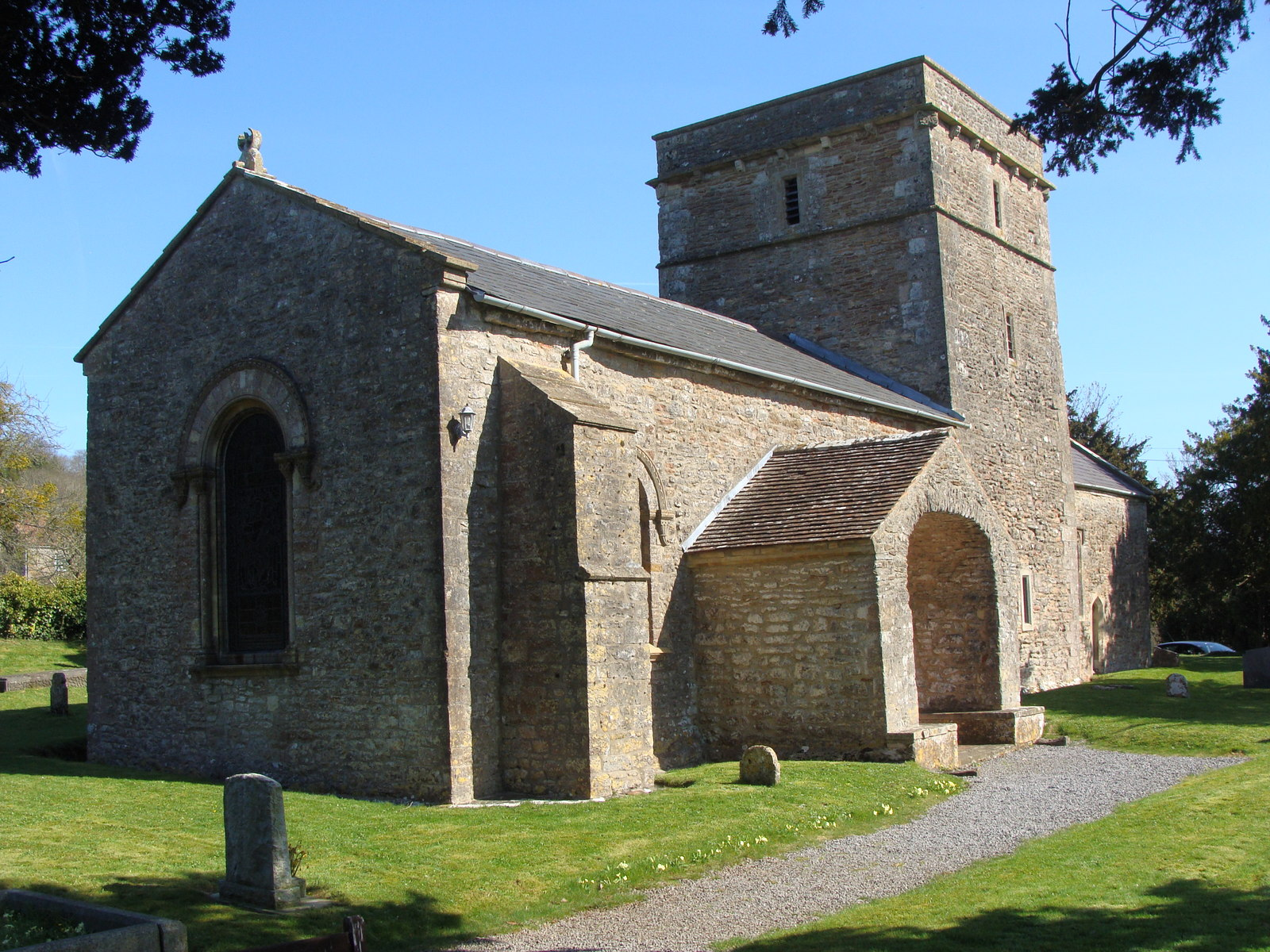

- Location within Somerset

General information
- Location: Christon, North Somerset, England
- Coordinates: 51.311392°N 2.891567°W
- Completed: 12th century

The Church of St Mary in Christon, North Somerset, England dates from the 12th century and has been designated as a Grade I listed building.

The Norman structure has a three bay nave with a south porch and chancel. The short two-stage tower is central and has a quadripartite vault below it. The door in the porch is round headed and has columns on either side. The outside of the building has five Romanesque corbels including one with double human heads which may be from a later period. The 12th century font consists of a cylindrical stem on rectangular blocks. The bowl is square and decorated on three faces.

The Crook Peak parish is part of the Diocese of Bath and Wells.

== See also ==
- List of Grade I listed buildings in North Somerset
- List of towers in Somerset
- List of ecclesiastical parishes in the Diocese of Bath and Wells
