= Church of St Peter & St Paul, Bleadon =

Church in Somerset, England

Church of St Peter & St Paul
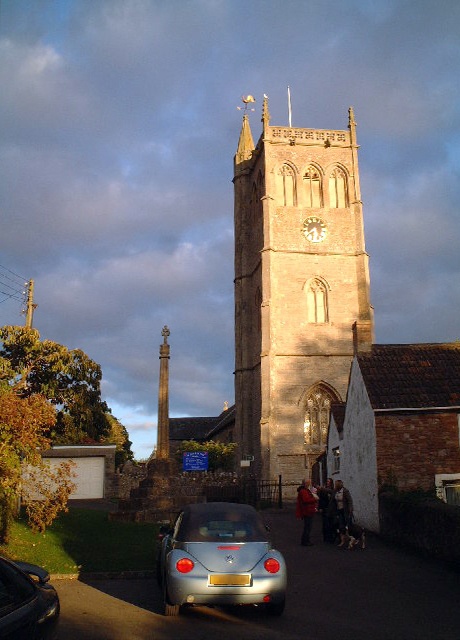

- Location within Somerset

General information
- Location: Bleadon, England
- Coordinates: 51.3075°N 2.9462°W
- Completed: 1317

The Church of St Peter and St Paul dominates the village of Bleadon, Somerset, England.

It was built in the 14th century (dedicated in 1317), being restored and the chancel shortened in the mid 19th century. It is a Grade I listed building.

The tower, which has been dated to around 1390, contains five bells dating from 1711 and made by Edward Bilbie of the Bilbie family, and one from 1925 by the Whitechapel Bell Foundry.

The interior of the church includes a Norman tub font and a pulpit dating from about 1460. The Sweetland organ dates from 1893 and was moved to its present position in 1956. The stained glass window is from 1964.

The Anglican parish is part of the Bleadon benefice within the archdeaconry of Bath.

== See also ==
- List of Grade I listed buildings in North Somerset
- List of towers in Somerset
- List of ecclesiastical parishes in the Diocese of Bath and Wells
