= Over Langford Manor =

Historic site in Somerset, England

- The Old Courthouse
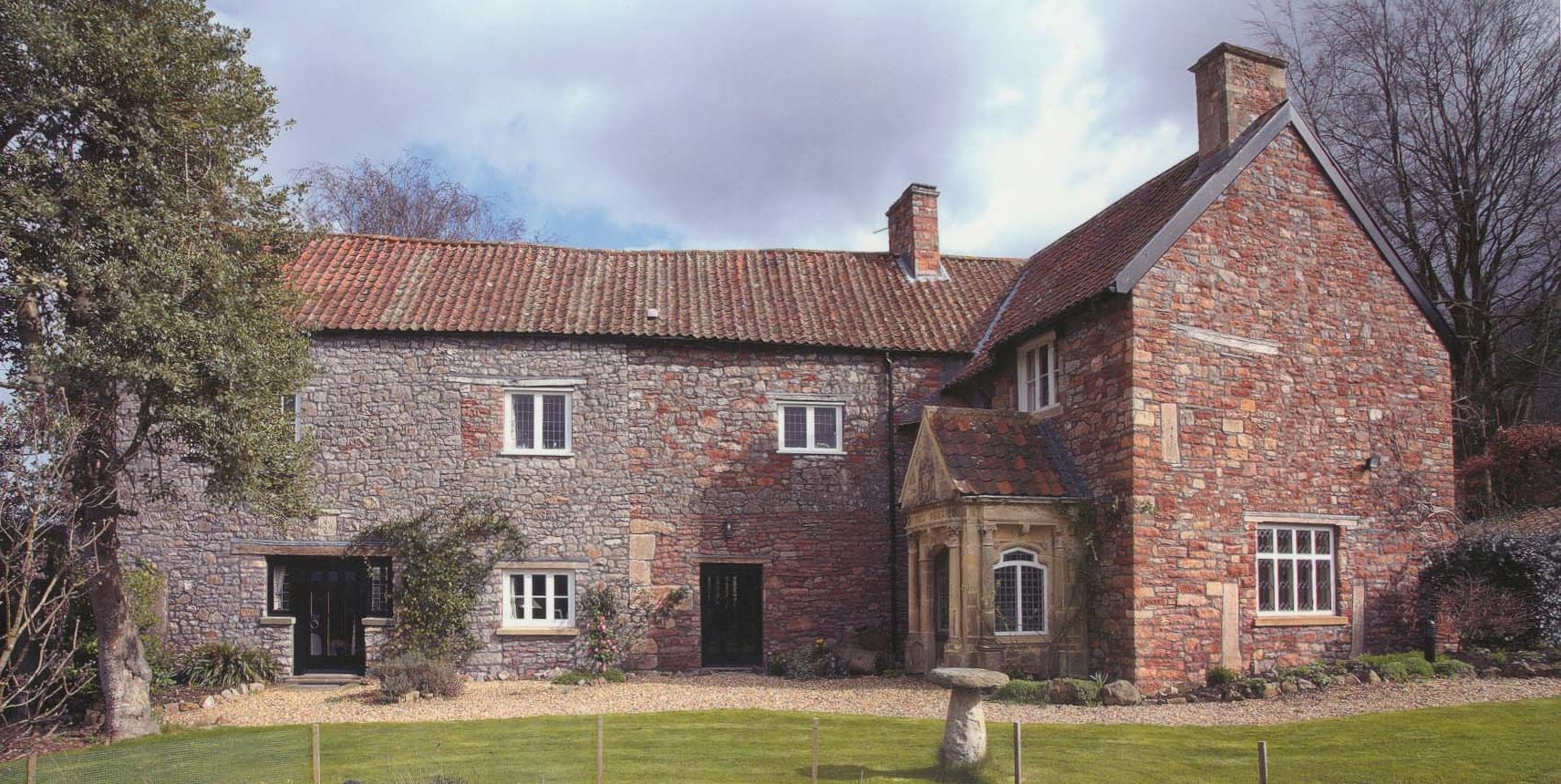
- Over Langford Manor from the West

- Location within Somerset
- 51°19′54″N 2°46′02″W
- Location: Upper Langford, Somerset, England.

History
- Built: Late 15th century

Listed Building – Grade II
- Designated: 9 February 1961
- Reference no.: 1311746

Over Langford Manor, also known as The Old Courthouse (of the infamous Judge Jeffreys) is a Grade II listed building, in Upper Langford, North Somerset, England.

The original east-west mediaeval farmhouse (late 15th century), now mostly demolished, was the earliest part of the Manor. A north-south wing dating back to both the 16th and 17th centuries abuts the original house. The wall of the sole remaining part of the original mediaeval building is 33 inches thick. As the subsequent additions were built, they were of decreasing wall thickness as befitted the times. Accordingly, the central section of the house is 16th century and the most northerly Hall is 17th century. One of the very old internal ceiling beams shows a bevelled surface along one side and a flat surface on the other. The flat surface (to the north) was where an internal wall was once, and this equates to the position of the outside quoins. This represents where the building stopped for a hundred years or so, before being extended northwards towards the road.

The Manor has had its fair share of famous inhabitants including Sir John Latch who, in 1627, was the High Sheriff of Somerset. In 1642, Sir John, a staunch Republican, leased Over Langford Manor and raised soldiers for Cromwell's New Model Army. Two years later, after returning from the Second Battle of Newbury, he died of shock upon discovering his wife and twelfth child had died in childbirth. The couple's poignant memorial is in Church of St John the Baptist, Churchill in Churchill, Somerset. Sir Lintorn Simmons, the Governor of Malta, bought the manor in December 1873. His daughter Blanch Lintorn Orman went on to help found the Girl Guides movement in 1910. Sir Lintorn's granddaughter, Rotha Beryl Lintorn Orman, founded the British Fascists in 1923, the idea came to her while digging the vegetable garden here. She lived there until she died in Las Palmas in the Canary Islands from tuberculosis in 1935.

In 1904 Lt Cdr Charles Evans bought the Manor including the Latch porch After demolishing the west wing he transferred some salvaged fireplaces and panelling to adorn the new wing he was building at Nailsea Court. The panelling was installed in his new withdrawing room. Consequently this room was called the Langford Parlour but is now known as the Langford Room. The Latch porch was at Nailsea Court for nearly twenty years, before being returned by Charles Evans to Upper Langford in 1923. The 1911 inscription that he added commemorates the date it was rebuilt at Nailsea Court. Therefore, although it was in Charles Evans' possession for all that time, it only stood as we see it in the 21 December edition of Country Life in 1912, for twelve years.

The Latch porch is arguably the Manor's most famous claim to fame, even having picture postcards made of it in the reign of Edward VII. The porch itself is described by Williams as "having decoration and style so exuberant that one is tempted to suspect that some 'antiquarian' embellishment has been introduced; this especially at the sides which have shouldered arched openings ovolo moulded. Unlike most 17th century porches, it is of squat single storey and has a restored pediment gable to the front where the four-centred arch is ovolo moulded with egg and dart decoration on the arch. It is flanked by Corinthian columns on pedestals supporting a frieze and dentilled course. In the gable is a strapwork motif"

In 2003 an application to extend one of the agricultural outbuildings and use it as a farm shop was rejected by North Somerset Council.
