= Church of SS Quiricus & Julietta, Tickenham =

Church in Somerset, England

Church of SS Quiricus & Julietta
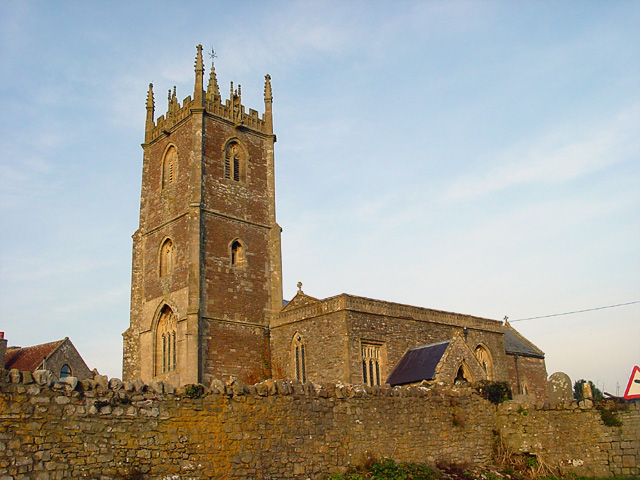

- Location within Somerset

General information
- Location: Tickenham, England
- Coordinates: 51.4394°N 2.7814°W
- Completed: 11th century

The parish Church of St. Quiricus and St. Julietta in Tickenham, Somerset, England, has 11th-century origins, with the nave and chancel being extended by the addition of aisles and the south chapel in the early 13th century. It has been designated as a Grade I listed building.

The church's dedication to the saints Quiricus and Julietta is extremely unusual – there are three similar dedications in the UK, two in Cornwall at Luxulyan and St Veep, and one at Swaffham Prior, in Cambridgeshire.

== History ==
The oldest part of the church is the chancel which has a low Norman arch. Aisles were added to the nave and chancel in the early 13th century. The south aisle west window and north aisle windows date from the mid 14th century. The tower was added in 1497. It was formerly known as the Bave Chapel after the Bave family of Barrow Court.

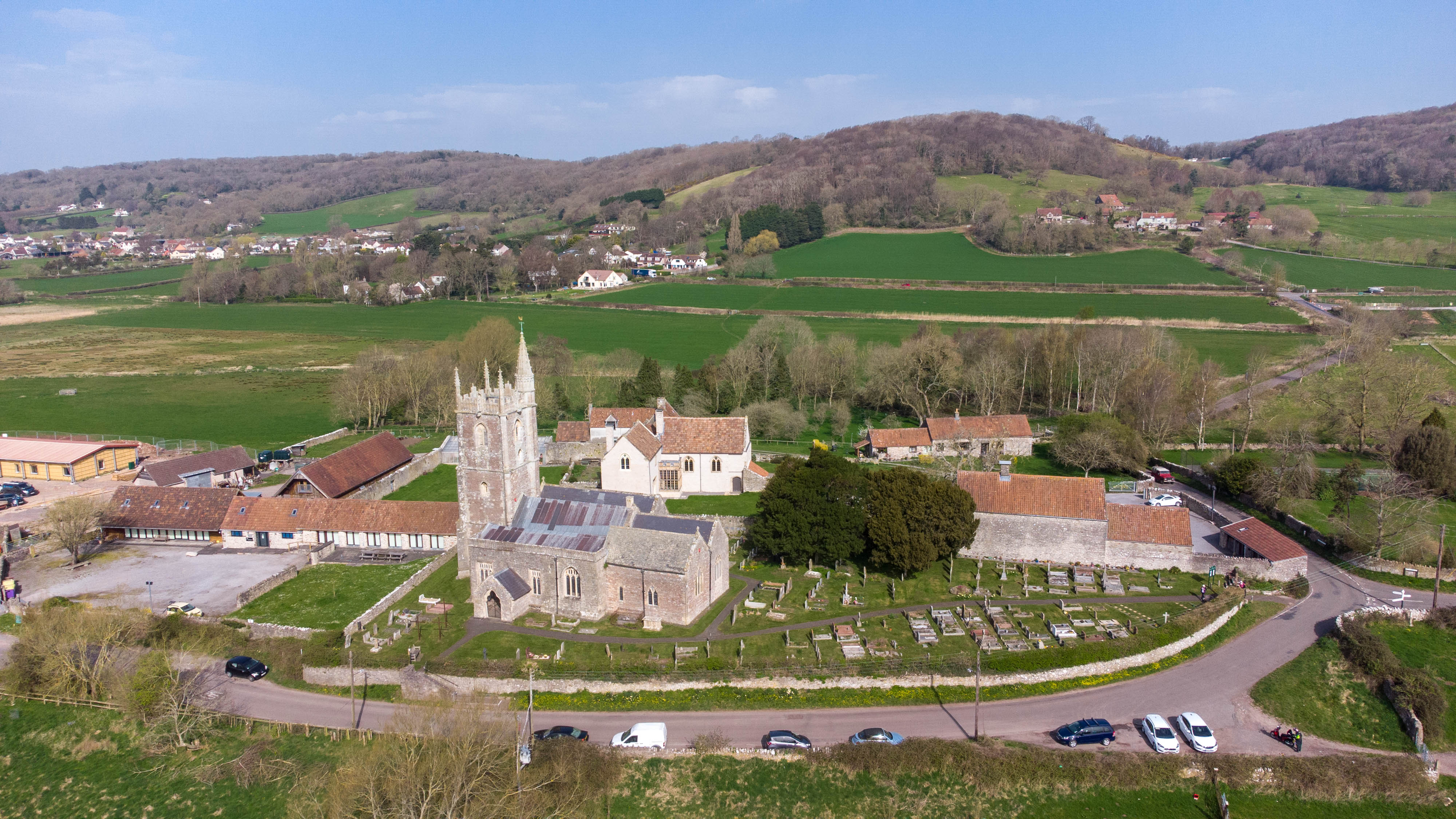
Aerial view of Church of SS Quiricus & Julietta

== Fittings ==
The baptismal font in the south aisle dates from around 1300, and consists of a square bowl with blank trefoiled pointed arch-heads, central shaft and four slimmer Purbeck shafts. There is also a hexagonal Jacobean carved wooden pulpit in the nave.

The chancel altar and chapel altar are supported by columns of Elton ware, gift of Sir Edmund Elton, 8th Baronet, in 1895. The stained glass windows include a small early 14th-century figures of Christ Crucified and Christ in Majesty in south aisle. There are also later 14th-century fragments in the north aisle windows.

== See also ==
- List of Grade I listed buildings in North Somerset
- List of towers in Somerset
- List of ecclesiastical parishes in the Diocese of Bath and Wells
