= Church of All Saints, Kingston Seymour =

Church in North Somerset, UK

Church of All Saints
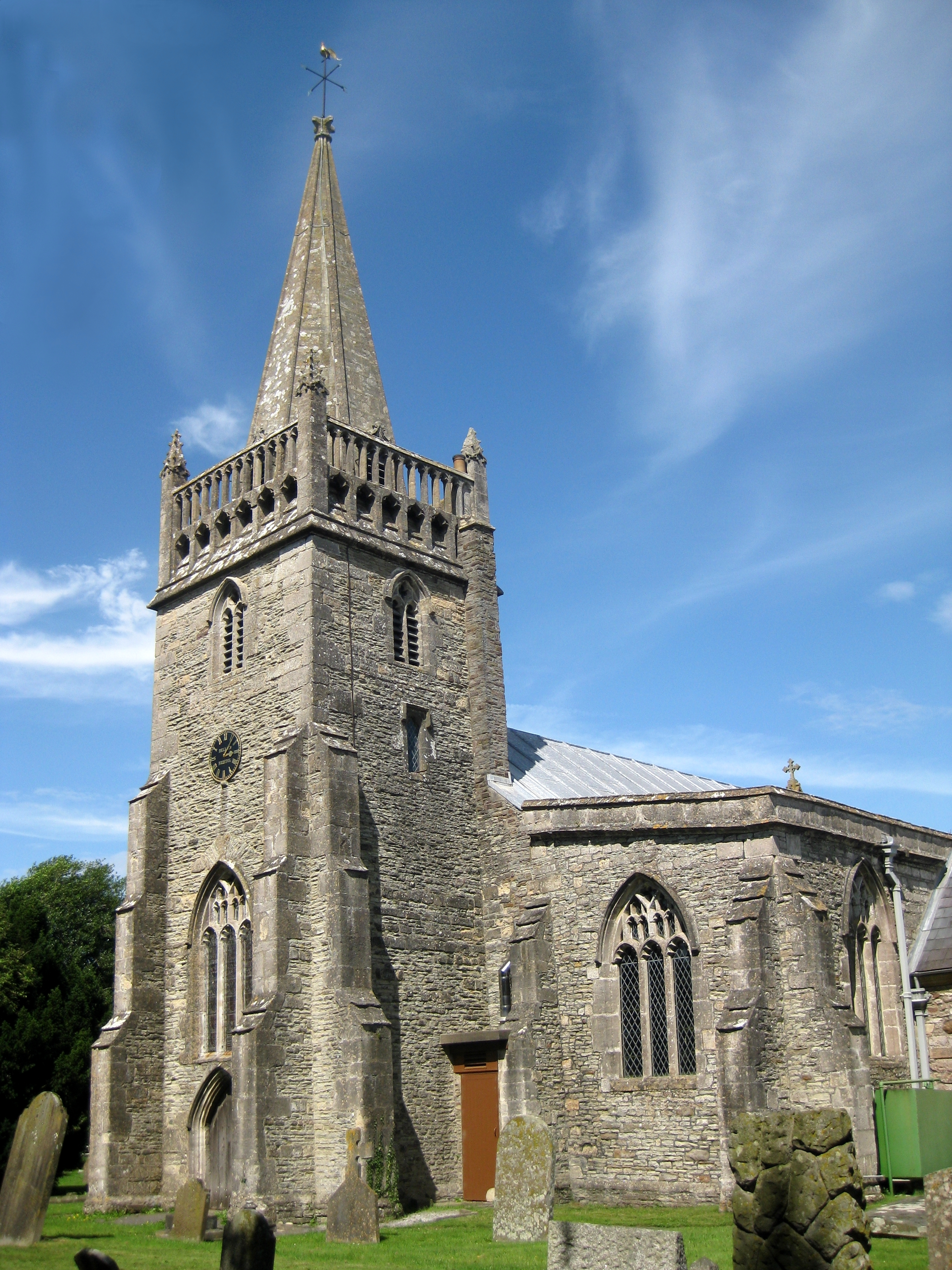

- Location within Somerset

General information
- Location: Kingston Seymour, England
- Coordinates: 51.3976°N 2.8626°W
- Completed: late 14th/early 15th century

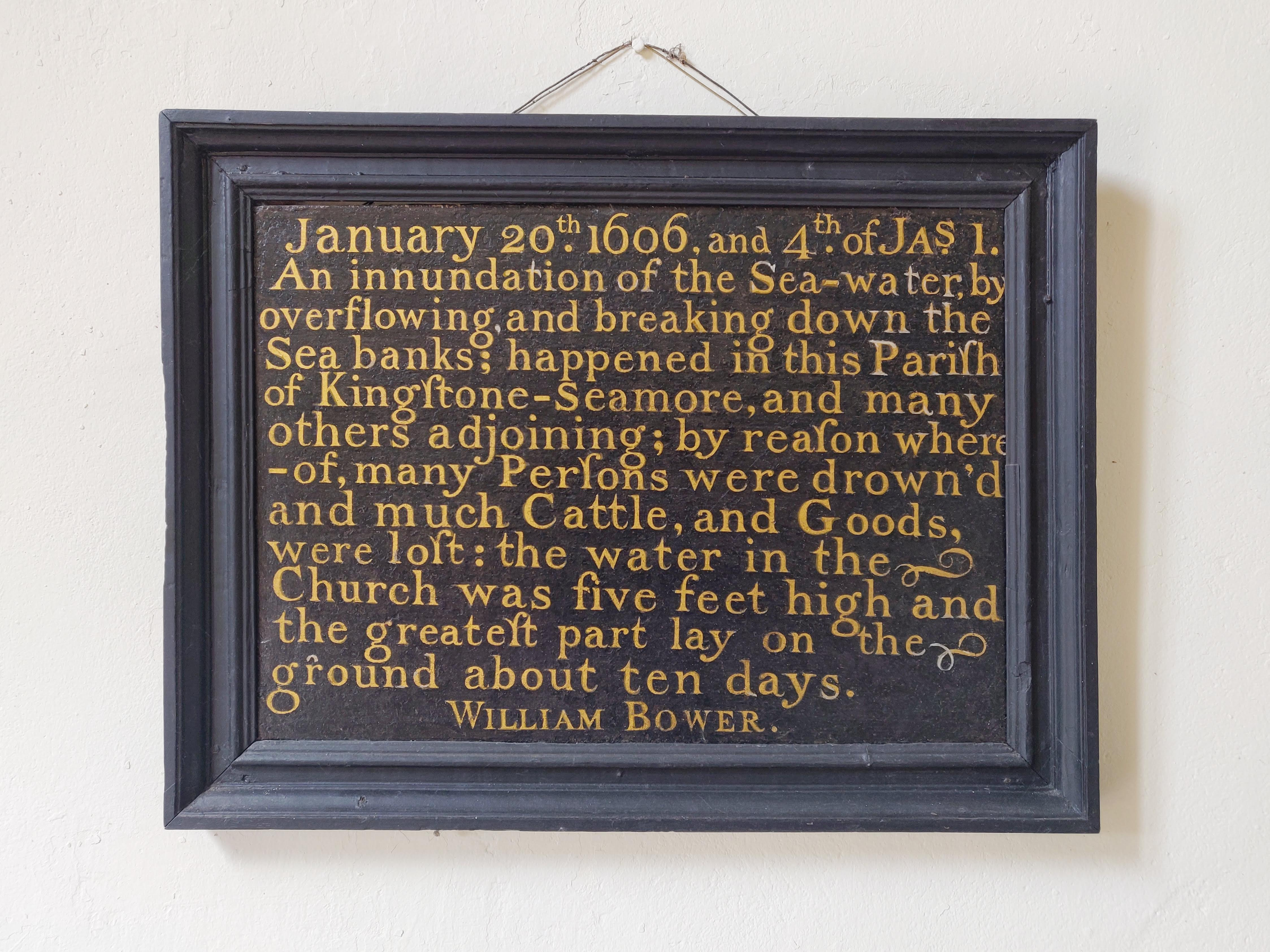
Plaque recording the flood of 1606/07

The Church of All Saints in Kingston Seymour, Somerset, England dates from the late 14th or early 15th century. It has been designated as a Grade I listed building.

== History ==
The base of the font is older than the church itself being Norman in origin.

The church is almost surrounded by water and was inundated with water to a depth of 5 feet (1.5 m) during the Bristol Channel floods of 1607. The highest point reached by the water, which was 7.74 metres (25.4 ft), is marked on the church. A brass plaque in the church reads:

An inundation of the sea water by overflowing and breaking down the Sea banks; happened in this Parish of Kingstone-Seamore, and many others adjoining; by reason whereof many Persons were drown'd and much Cattle and Goods, were lost: the water in the Church was five feet high and the greatest part lay on the ground about ten days. WILLIAM BOWER

The tower contains a peal of six bells, including three from 1632 which were cast by Purdues of Bristol. The shaft of the churchyard cross is 1.5 metres (4 ft 11 in) high and stands on an octagonal base. The shaft was added in 1863.

The stained glass includes the Smyth-Piggot memorial in the west window which was replaced in a restoration of 1917 to designs by Roland Paul.

== Administration ==
The parish is part of the Yatton Moor benefice within the deanery of Portishead.

== See also ==
- Grade I listed buildings in North Somerset
- List of Somerset towers
