= Church of Holy Trinity, Burrington =

Church in Somerset, England

Church of Holy Trinity
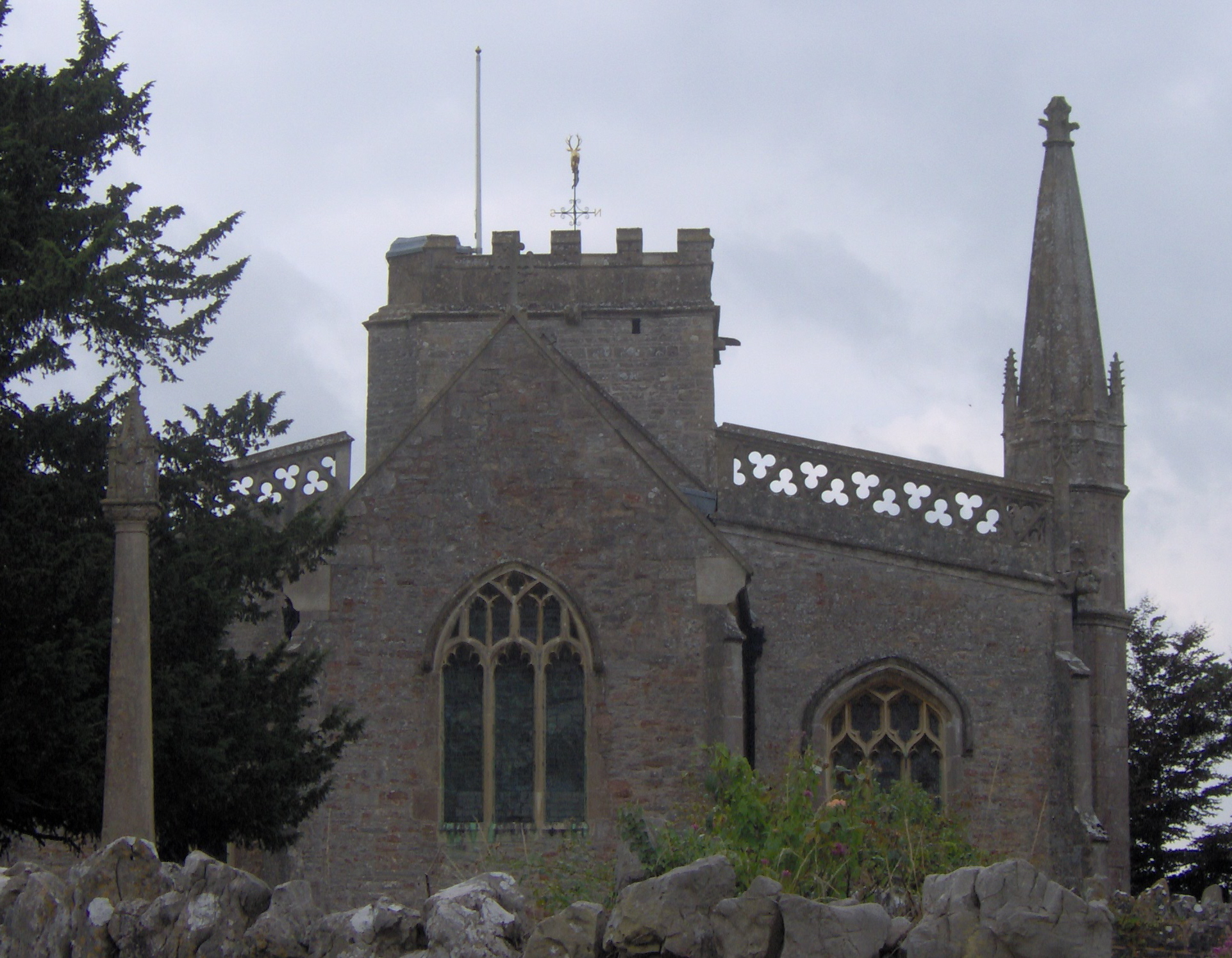

- Location within Somerset

General information
- Location: Burrington, Somerset, England
- Coordinates: 51.3307°N 2.7497°W
- Completed: 15th century

The Church of the Holy Trinity in Burrington, Somerset, England, is from the 15th century and was restored in 1884. It is a Grade I listed building.

The tower is square with diagonal buttresses but joins somewhat uncomfortably with the nave. It dates from the early 14th century. It contains a bell dating from 1713 and made by Edward Bilbie of the Bilbie family.

The rest of the church is all late Perpendicular. There are a few remnants of pre-Reformation stained glass but the great majority of the windows are Victorian. Of these the most notable are: the window in the south wall of the south aisle by Warrington; the window from the east in the south aisle by Charles Eamer Kempe; the west window of the south aisle by Warde and Hughes; and the west window of the north aisle by Heaton, Butler and Bayne. One window includes the arms of the Capels of Langford Court.

The pews were installed in 1913 in memory of William Wills, 1st Baron Winterstoke.

In 2000 a gold leaf weathervane was erected at the top of the tower.

== See also ==
- List of Grade I listed buildings in North Somerset
- List of towers in Somerset
- List of ecclesiastical parishes in the Diocese of Bath and Wells
