= Kewstoke =

Village in Somerset, England

Coordinates: 51.3677°N 2.9604°W

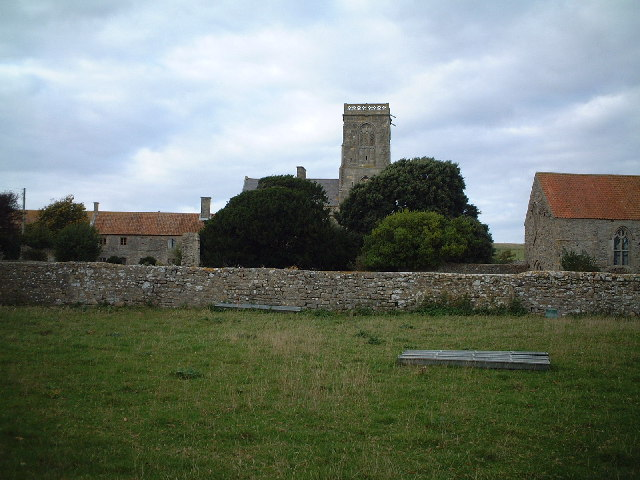
- Woodspring Priory

- Location within Somerset
- Population: 1,690
- OS grid reference: ST341661
- Unitary authority: North Somerset
- Ceremonial county: Somerset
- Region: South West
- Country: England
- Sovereign state: United Kingdom
- Post town: Weston-super-Mare
- Postcode district: BS22
- Dialling code: 01934
- Police: Avon and Somerset
- Fire: Avon
- Ambulance: South Western
- UK Parliament: Weston-super-Mare

Kewstoke is a civil parish and village in Somerset, England, within the unitary authority of North Somerset, located next to the strip of coast called Sand Bay. Its population in the 2011 census was 1,690.

== History ==
The parish was part of the Winterstoke Hundred.

== Governance ==
The parish council has responsibility for local issues, including setting an annual precept (local rate) to cover the council's operating costs and producing annual accounts for public scrutiny. The parish council evaluates local planning applications and works with the local police, district council officers, and neighbourhood watch groups on matters of crime, security, and traffic. The parish council's role also includes initiating projects for the maintenance and repair of parish facilities, such as the village hall or community centre, playing fields and playgrounds, as well as consulting with the district council on the maintenance, repair, and improvement of highways, drainage, footpaths, public transport, and street cleaning. Conservation matters (including trees and listed buildings) and environmental issues are also of interest to the council.

The parish falls within the unitary authority of North Somerset which was created in 1996, as established by the Local Government Act 1992. Between 1 April 1974 and 1 April 1996, it was in the Woodspring district of the county of Avon. Prior to 1974 the parish was part of the Axbridge Rural District.

An electoral ward with the same name exists. The ward starts at Kewstoke on the Bristol Channel then moves inland to Puxton. The total ward population taken at the 2011 census was 3,380.

The parish is represented in the House of Commons of the Parliament of the United Kingdom as part of the Weston-super-Mare county constituency. It was also part of the South West England constituency of the European Parliament prior to Britain leaving the European Union in January 2020.

== Geography ==
Being in places only 6 metres (20 ft) above sea level, the settlements of Kewstoke and Sand Bay are, and have been historically, susceptible to flooding. Following several incidents of flooding a sea defence of combined dune system (sand was imported from the estuary to form this) and concrete walls are now in place along much of Beach Road. Whilst the sea defences have proved very effective for the last two decades, concerns about the long-term stability of the dunes, in particular, remain.

In the Severn Estuary Shoreline Management Plan, 2000, commissioned by the Severn Estuary Coastal Group and carried out by Gifford Associated Consultants, the importance of sea defence maintenance was highlighted. The report stated that leaving the defences unmaintained would increase the risk of a severe flood to the low-lying residential area of Kewstoke and an extensive area of agricultural land that are currently defended. The authors went on to discuss the importance in the shorter and longer term of ensuring that the current defence line is kept and said that monitoring and research of the coastal processes on the foreshore is recommended. The Sand Bay Management Committee is keeping a close eye on the conditions of both the salt marsh and the sand dunes.

== Landmarks ==
Monk's Steps (also known as St Kew's Steps) are an ancient set of stone steps leading from St Paul's church up through the woods on Monk's Hill. Although the origins of the steps are unknown, the presence of man in the adjacent woodland on Worlebury Hill can be traced back to the Iron Age.

== Sport ==
There is a local football team, Kewstoke JFC.

The local primary school is Kewstoke Primary school, for children aged 4–11; it also has a preschool within the school for children aged 3–4. There used to be a pre-school at the village hall but it stopped because of a lack of children.

== Religious sites ==
The local parish church, St Paul's, dates from the 12th century with the tower being built in 1395. The tower is in two stages, with rendered, diagonal buttresses with setbacks which rise through parapet as corner pinnacles. A polygonal stair turret at the south east corner rises to a pyramidal cap. The first stage has two 2-light perpendicular west window under a plain drip mould, and similar but smaller window with carved stops to the south. The second stage has one 2-light perpendicular window under a drip mould with carved stops on each side; all louvres except the west which is blank. A quatrefoil pierced parapet has gargoyles at the corner. It has been designated as a Grade I listed building. In 1849 a reliquary was found in St Paul's Church that was believed to have come originally from the priory and to contain the blood of Thomas Becket. It is believed that it was moved to St Paul's for safe keeping at the time of the dissolution of the monasteries.

Near the village, at the base of a promontory called Middle Hope (which extends out into the sea as Sand Point), is Woodspring Priory, which is Grade I listed. The priory was founded in 1210 by William de Courtenay, grandson of Reginald Fitz Urse (one of the knights who murdered Thomas Becket), perhaps to atone for the past action of his grandfather.
