= St Paul's Church, Kewstoke =

Church in Somerset, England

Church of St Paul
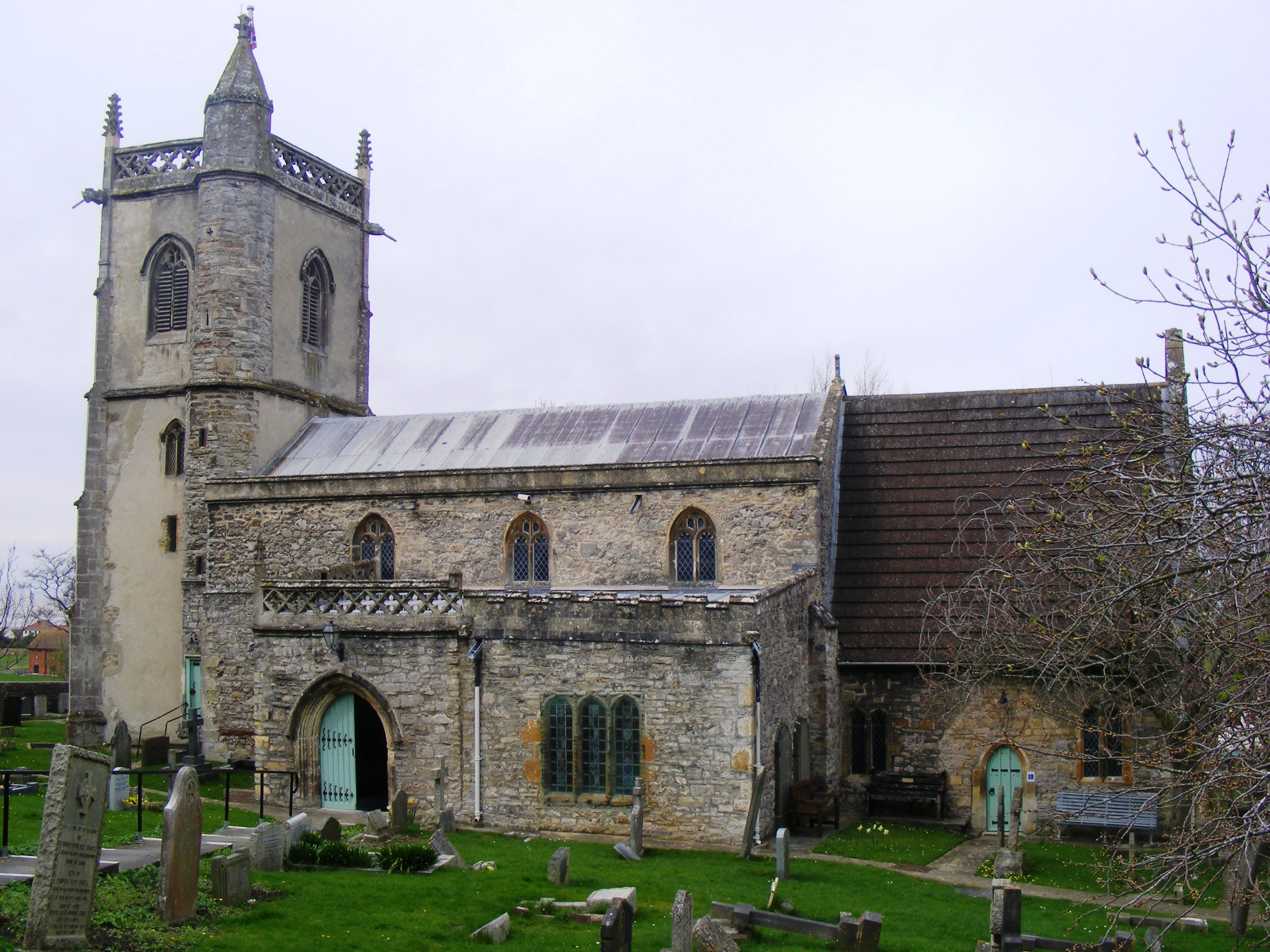

- Location within Somerset

General information
- Location: Kewstoke, England
- Coordinates: 51.3655°N 2.9570°W
- Completed: 12th century

The Church of St Paul in Kewstoke, Somerset, England dates from the 12th century with the tower being built in 1395. It has been designated as a Grade I listed building.

The tower is in two stages, with rendered, diagonal buttresses with setbacks which rise through parapet as corner pinnacles. A polygonal stair turret at the south east corner rises to a pyramidal cap. The first stage has two 2-light perpendicular west window under a plain drip mould, and similar but smaller window with carved stops to the south. The second stage has one 2-light perpendicular window under a drip mould with carved stops on each side; all louvres except the west which is blank. A quatrefoil pierced parapet has gargoyles at the corner. The tower has a peel of 6 bells.

In 1849 a reliquary was found in St Paul's Church that was believed to have come originally from the priory and to contain the blood of Thomas Becket. It is believed that it was moved to St Paul's for safe keeping at the time of the Dissolution of the Monasteries and is now in the Museum of Somerset in Taunton.

The font dates from the 14th century, but has been re-cut, with the bowl being much older than the base.

== See also ==
- Grade I listed buildings in North Somerset
- List of Somerset towers
- List of ecclesiastical parishes in the Diocese of Bath and Wells
