= St Michael's Church, Clapton in Gordano =

Church in Somerset, England

Church of St Michael
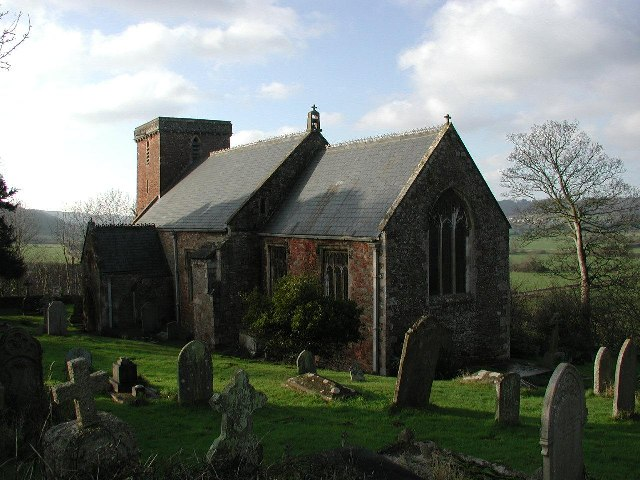

- Location within Somerset

General information
- Location: Clapton in Gordano, England
- Coordinates: 51.4583°N 2.7673°W
- Completed: 13th century

The Church of St Michael in Clapton in Gordano, Somerset, England, dates from the 13th century and is recorded in the National Heritage List for England as a designated Grade I listed building, and is a redundant church in the care of the Churches Conservation Trust. It was vested in the Trust on 1 June 1995.

St Michael's closed in 1995 but due to its architectural interest was adopted by the Trust, however occasional services are still held throughout the year.

The 12th-century tympanum is the oldest visible part of the church to have survived, however the majority of the building is from the 13th century.

Inside are reredos and benches, a 14th-century font and a late 17th-century monument. The 13th-century oak screen in the church originally divided the Great Hall and the Buttery in the adjacent Court House.

The first record of the church is an agreement dated 1226 between William, son of Arthur de Clopton and Richard of Keynsham Abbey.

== See also ==
- List of Grade I listed buildings in North Somerset
- List of towers in Somerset
- List of churches preserved by the Churches Conservation Trust in South West England
- List of ecclesiastical parishes in the Diocese of Bath and Wells
