= Church of St John the Baptist, Churchill =

Coordinates: 51.338542°N 2.808888°W

Church of St John the Baptist
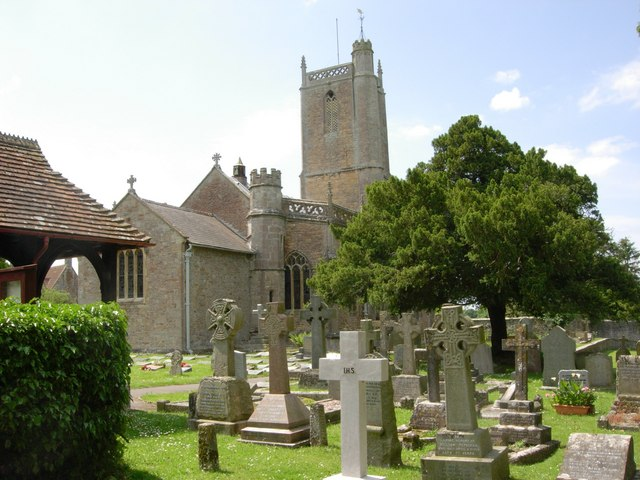

- Location in Somerset
- Location: Churchill, Somerset
- Country: England
- Denomination: Anglican

History
- Dedication: Saint John the Baptist

Architecture
- Heritage designation: Grade I
- Architectural type: Church
- Completed: 12th century

The Church of St John the Baptist in Churchill, Somerset, England, was largely built around 1360 and is a Grade I listed building.

There was a Norman chapel on this site in 1180, from which the nave has survived into the present church.

The stone font dates from around 1200, although the wooden font cover was added in 1879 when there was a revival in gothic designs. The stained glass windows are from a variety of periods.

The tower has three stages with diagonal buttresses, moulded string courses, north-east polygonal higher corner stair turret with blind panelled embattled cap and pierced quatrefoil lozenge parapet with corner pinnacles and gargoyles. It is dated to c. 1360 by Poyntz Wright and after 1420 by Harvey.

== See also ==
- List of Grade I listed buildings in North Somerset
- List of towers in Somerset
- List of ecclesiastical parishes in the Diocese of Bath and Wells
