= Nailsea Court =

Grade I listed building in Somerset, UK

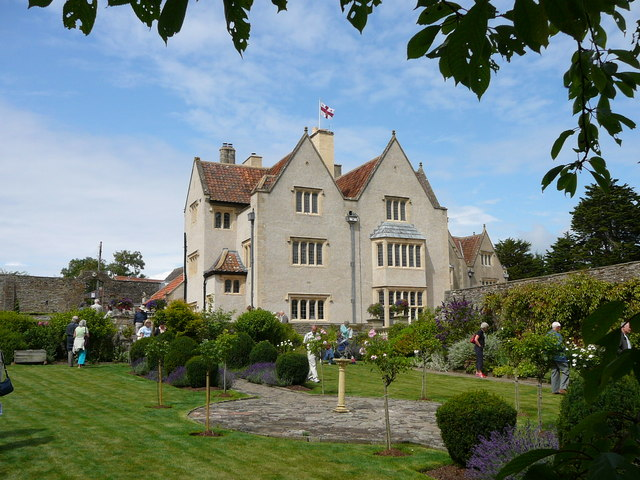
- Nailsea Court during a gardens open day in 2009

- Location within Somerset
- 51.4102°N 2.7819°W
- Location: Nailsea, Somerset, England

History
- Built: 15th century

Listed Building – Grade I
- Official name: Nailsea Court
- Designated: 13 October 1952
- Reference no.: 1129104

Nailsea Court in Nailsea, Somerset, England, is an English manor house dating from the 15th century. Pevsner describes the house as "historically highly instructive and interesting" and it is a Grade I listed building.

In 1574 the house was owned by George Perceval, the father of Richard Percivale who was born in the house and later deciphered Spanish documents for Queen Elizabeth about the Spanish Armada. Later owners in the 16th and 17th centuries included the local member of parliament Richard Cole and Nathaniel Wade who was condemned to death for his part in the Monmouth Rebellion. After 1795 a series of owners, who never lived in the house, leased it for use as a farmhouse and it fell into disrepair. In 1906 it was bought by Charles Edward Evans who undertook a major restoration project including bringing in materials from surrounding Tudor manors. After World War II it was converted into flats and in the 1990s into five private dwellings.

The building has been changed and expanded over the centuries. It now consists of a main 3 storey block with two wings. The interior includes fine wooden panelling and plaster ceilings. Some of the original fireplaces survive and many of the rooms include decorative stained glass. It is surrounded by landscaped grounds including a sunken garden and a knot garden. There is a 17th-century barn adjacent to the house.

== History ==
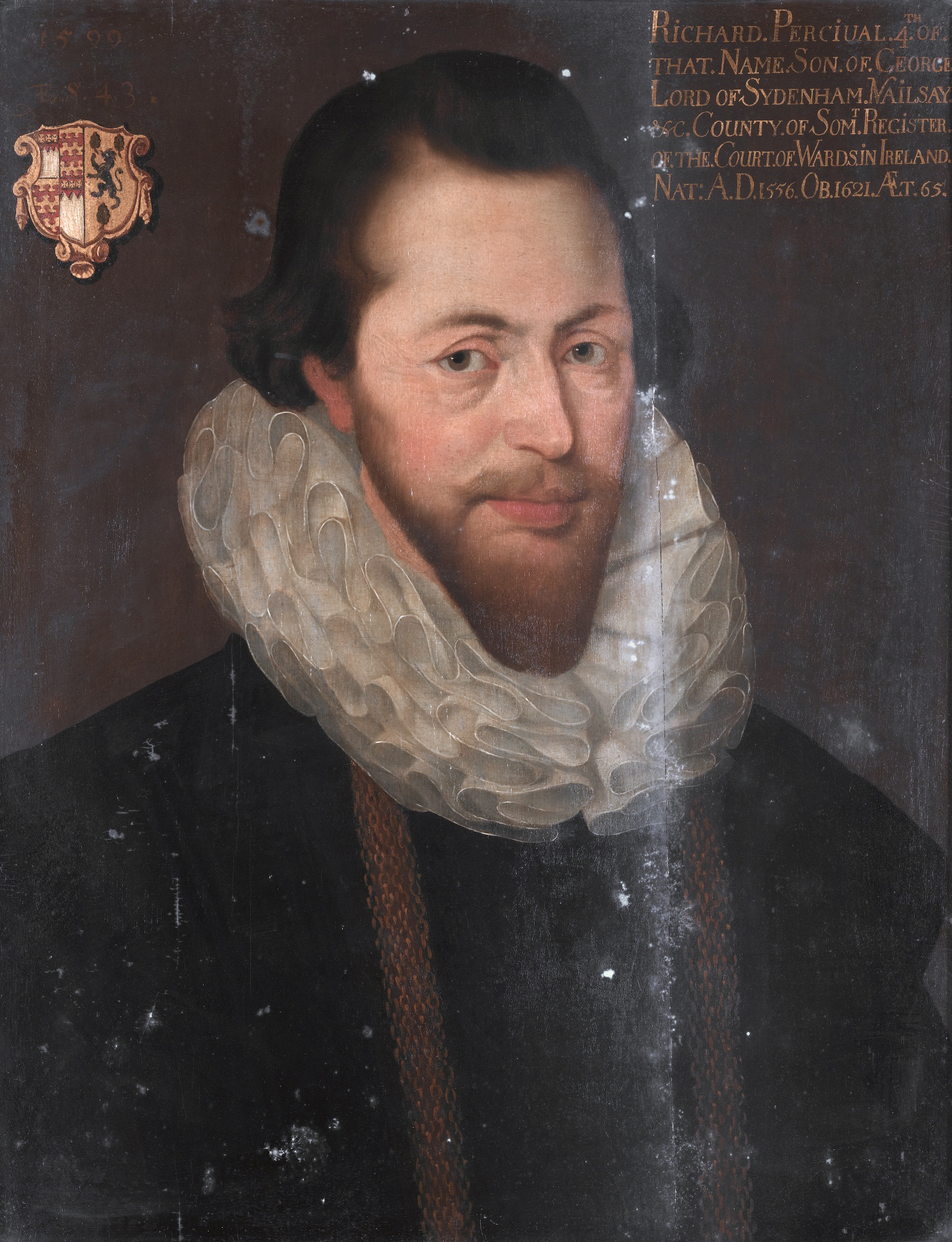
Richard Percivale

The exact date of construction is not known, but is believed to have started in the 15th century and was definitely before 1574, when the initials of the owner George Perceval, the father of Richard Percivale, were added to the chimney piece in the library. One of his descendants Richard Percivale (or Perceval) contributed to the English response to the plans for invasion by the Spanish Armada by deciphering Spanish documents for Queen Elizabeth. Perceval sold the estate to the Bristol merchant and member of parliament Richard Cole in 1582 and it was passed down to his descendants.

In 1693, the house was purchased by Nathaniel Wade and around this time the roof was raised and a floor added into the original hall house. In 1685, during the Monmouth Rebellion Wade supported James Scott, 1st Duke of Monmouth. After the defeat of the rebels at the Battle of Sedgemoor Wade was captured. Judge Jefferys condemned him to death at Taunton King James, interviewed him and granted a pardon after which Wade returned home to Nailsea. On Wade's death in 1718 the house was bought by a London Barrister Christopher Appleby for £2,000. It was then sold to the Dowager Lady Coleraine and passed to her son-in-law a Dr Rogers. On the death of his wife the house became the property of her son in law Sir Robert Knight. From 1795 it had various owners including: Henry Cam Seymour, John Hugh Smyth Pigott in 1834, Reginald Rodbard in 1846, Thomas Todd Walters in 1865 and Henry John Mirehouse in 1874. However, none of them lived in the house and the building was used as a farmhouse and fell into disrepair.

Charles Edward Evans purchased Nailsea Court in 1906. He then started a restoration programme which took seven years. He employed Arthur James Stratton, an expert on Tudor architecture to reconstruct the west wing. The restoration included the use of materials from Over Langford Manor. The panelling was installed in his new withdrawing room. Consequently, this room was called the Langford Parlour but is now known as the Langford Room. The Latch porch from Langford was at Nailsea Court for nearly twenty years, before being returned by Charles Evans to Upper Langford in 1923. The rebuilding included the erection of a tower. The first version looked similar to a lighthouse and was changed to one of Tudor appearance which was incorporated into the south wing. During World War I, in an effort to conserve coal, brick insets were built into the fireplaces to reduce their size.

The Whitefield family bought the house after Evans death in 1944. They converted part of it into flats. The next sale was to a Mr McGrath in the 1970s. A private development company purchased the house and grounds in the 1990s, after which it was converted into five private homes.

== Architecture ==
The building consists of a main three storey block with two wings with gabled roofs in a Z-plan. The porch has a 4-centred arched door opening and a frieze with Greek fret carving. The construction of the building encompasses four phases; the fifteenth century, the Elizabethan era, the seventeenth century and a restoration by Arthur Stratton in the early twentieth century.

The interior of the building has been changed many times since its construction. The decorative features include several brought in from other buildings. Panelling was brought from Judge Jeffreys' house at No 18, Fore Street, Taunton. An over-mantel was imported from Field Marshal Sir Lintorn Simmons' house Over Langford Manor. In addition sections of wooden panelling were brought from Over Langford Manor. The result of these additions lead to the room being called The Langford Room. a fine plaster ceiling and carved frieze were brought to Nailsea Court from Ashley Manor in Bristol. The dining room door, which dates from around 1590, is also known as the "Nailsea door". It is decorated with a large arcaded and elaborately carved upper panel. In the hall there is a framed ceiling, this is formed into six bays each of which has chamfered and stopped beams. There is also a stone fireplace in the hall.

There is a variety of stained glass within the building including coats of arms, a sundial and depictions of various birds. A window to the west of main range has medieval stained glass including a picture of a swan ringing a bell, as at the Bishop's Palace, Wells, with others including a peacock, a heron, an owl, a crane and a bird with a bell attached to one leg.

== Gardens ==
The House is surrounded by 5 acres (2.0 ha) of gardens and approached by a tree-lined drive of mature sweet chestnut, walnut and cherry trees. There is a walled sunken garden and kitchen garden has raised vegetable beds, a glass-house and box knot garden. Many of the walls, gatepiers and the balustrade are from the 16th century but have been revised in the subsequent centuries. The old tennis court has been converted to a formal lawn with herbaceous borders. There is also a stone summerhouse which is early Jacobean.

A remodelled 17th century barn stands about 20 metres (66 ft) east of the house.

== See also ==
- List of Grade I listed buildings in North Somerset

== Sources ==
- Foyle, Andrew; Pevsner, Nikolaus (2011). Somerset: North and Bristol. The Buildings of England. Yale University Press. ISBN 978-0-300-12658-7. OCLC 751716531.
