= Blagdon Lake =

Lake in the United Kingdom

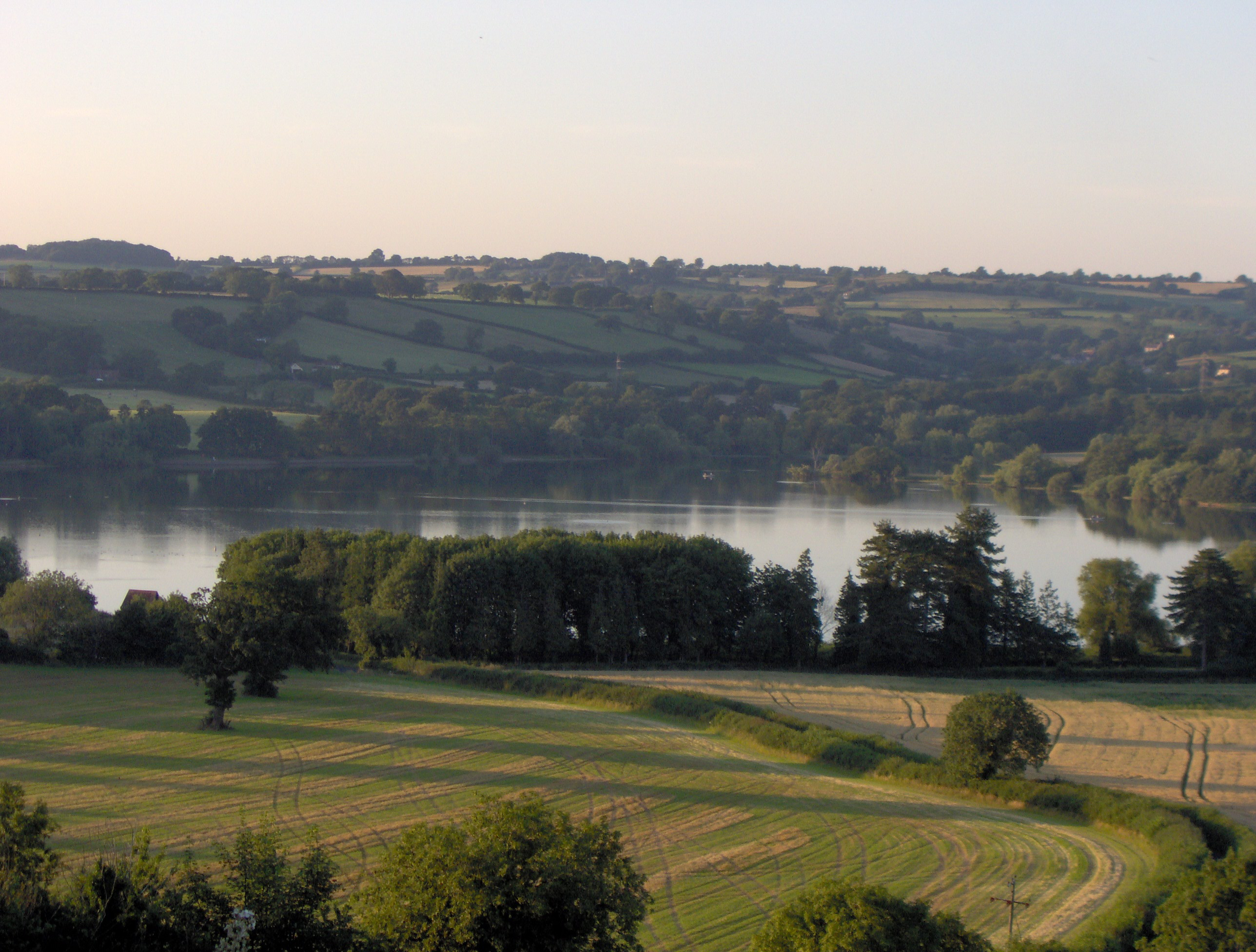

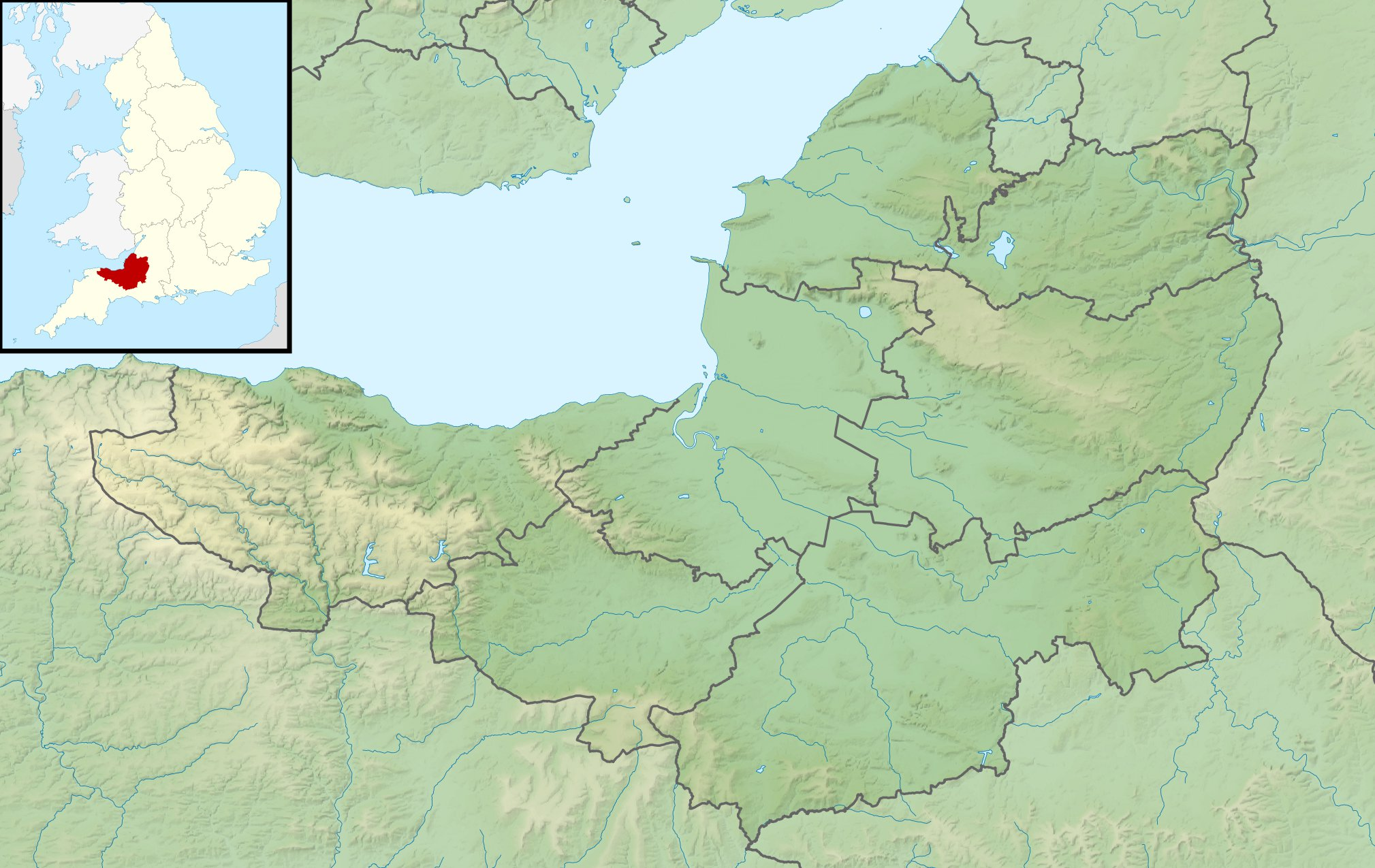
- Location within Somerset
- Location: Blagdon, Somerset
- Coordinates: 51°20′06″N 2°41′51″W
- Type: reservoir
- Primary inflows: River Yeo
- Primary outflows: River Yeo
- Catchment area: 2,144 ha (5,300 acres)
- Basin countries: United Kingdom
- Surface area: 440 acres (180 ha)
- Average depth: 14 ft (4.3 m)
- Max. depth: 42 ft (13 m)
- Water volume: 8,456 million litres (6,855 acre⋅ft)

Blagdon Lake lies in a valley at the northern edge of the Mendip Hills, close to the village of Blagdon and approximately 10 miles (16 km) south of Bristol, England. The lake was created by Bristol Water (Bristol Waterworks Company as it was known then), when it dammed the River Yeo, starting construction in 1898, to designs by Charles Hawksley, and completing this in 1905. The Wrington Vale Light Railway was constructed primarily to bring building materials for the lake.

The reservoir was formed by the construction of a dam and provided water to the pumping station which originally contained four Woolf compound rotative beam pumping engines, built by Glenfield & Kennedy of Kilmarnock, which have now been replaced by electric pumps. Two of the steam engines have been preserved, with one in working order as part of the visitor centre which also includes educational facilities for children. The pumping station is now a Grade II* listed building.

The 8,456,000,000-litre (1.860×10^{9} imp gal; 2.234×10^{9} US gal) lake still provides 9,547,000,000 L (2.100×10^{9} imp gal; 2.522×10^{9} US gal) of drinking water each year, but also acts as a fishing lake. It provides a habitat for a range of flora and fauna and is a Site of Special Scientific Interest. The original suction tanks, which formed the water supply for the steam boilers powering the pumping engines, are now used for trout rearing.

== Reservoir ==
The lake, which was originally called the Yeo reservoir, covers 440 acres (180 ha). The River Yeo rises in the centre of Compton Martin village, from there it flows past the village of Ubley and enters Blagdon Lake. From the lake the river flows south of Wrington and Iwood, where there were once a series of watermills along its banks. Its route then takes it around the northern outskirts of Congresbury, and across the North Somerset Levels roughly parallel to the A370 road, past the site of a Roman villa before crossing under the M5 motorway and emptying into the Severn Estuary in Woodspring Bay, downstream from Clevedon and west of the village of Kingston Seymour. The watershed catchment area of the reservoir is 2,144 hectares (5,300 acres).

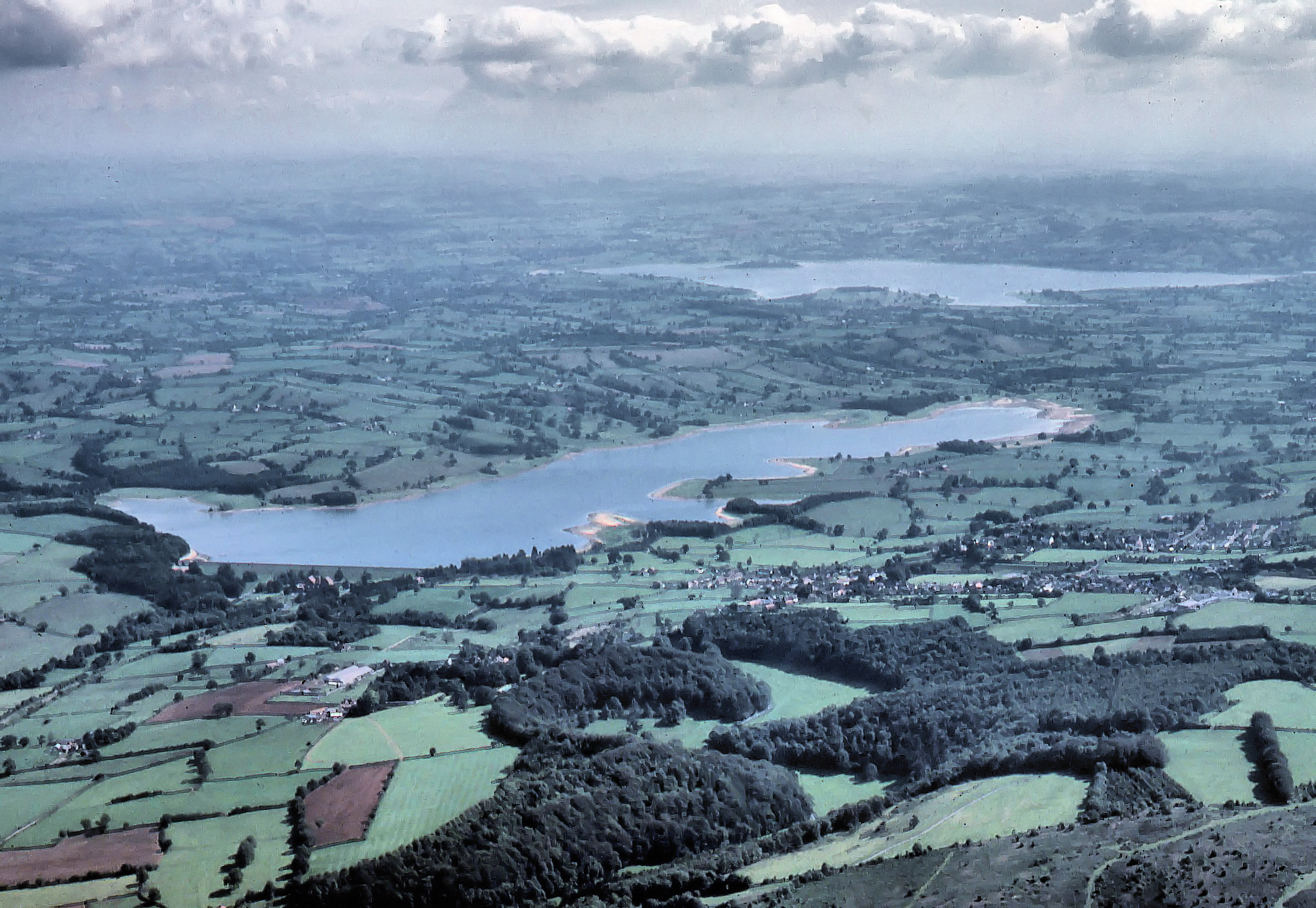
Aerial photograph showing Blagdon Lake in the foreground and Chew Valley Lake in the distance.

The construction of the reservoir was approved by acts of parliament in 1888 and 1889 as part of a plan to provide drinking water to Bristol, supplementing Barrow Gurney Reservoirs and the "line of works" pipe which carries water from the Mendip Hills. Construction required the provision of sewers to local villages to avoid contamination of the reservoir. The work was designed by Charles Hawksley. In conjunction with the construction work the Wrington Vale Light Railway was established connecting Blagdon with Congresbury on the Cheddar Valley Line and Yatton on the main Bristol to Exeter line. In addition to carrying construction materials for the reservoir and pumping station it also provided passenger services. Later the railway was used to bring coal for the pumps. Passenger traffic ceased in 1931 and the line to Blagdon closed completely in 1950.

The lake is relatively shallow, with an average depth of 14 ft (4.3 m) and only 42 ft (13 m) at its deepest point near the dam at the west end of the lake. The eastern end is the shallowest where the River Yeo enters. It is a hard water area with high mineral content that is vulnerable to eutrophication in the summer, that can cause algal blooms, with transient water layers. As a result, a research programme has been established to observe and measure the limnology of the lake. When full it contains 8,456,000,000 litres (1.860×10^{9} imp gal; 2.234×10^{9} US gal) and supplies 9,547,000,000 litres (2.100×10^{9} imp gal; 2.522×10^{9} US gal) of water each year. Water can also be taken from its larger neighbour Chew Valley Lake to balance the supply.

=== Dam ===
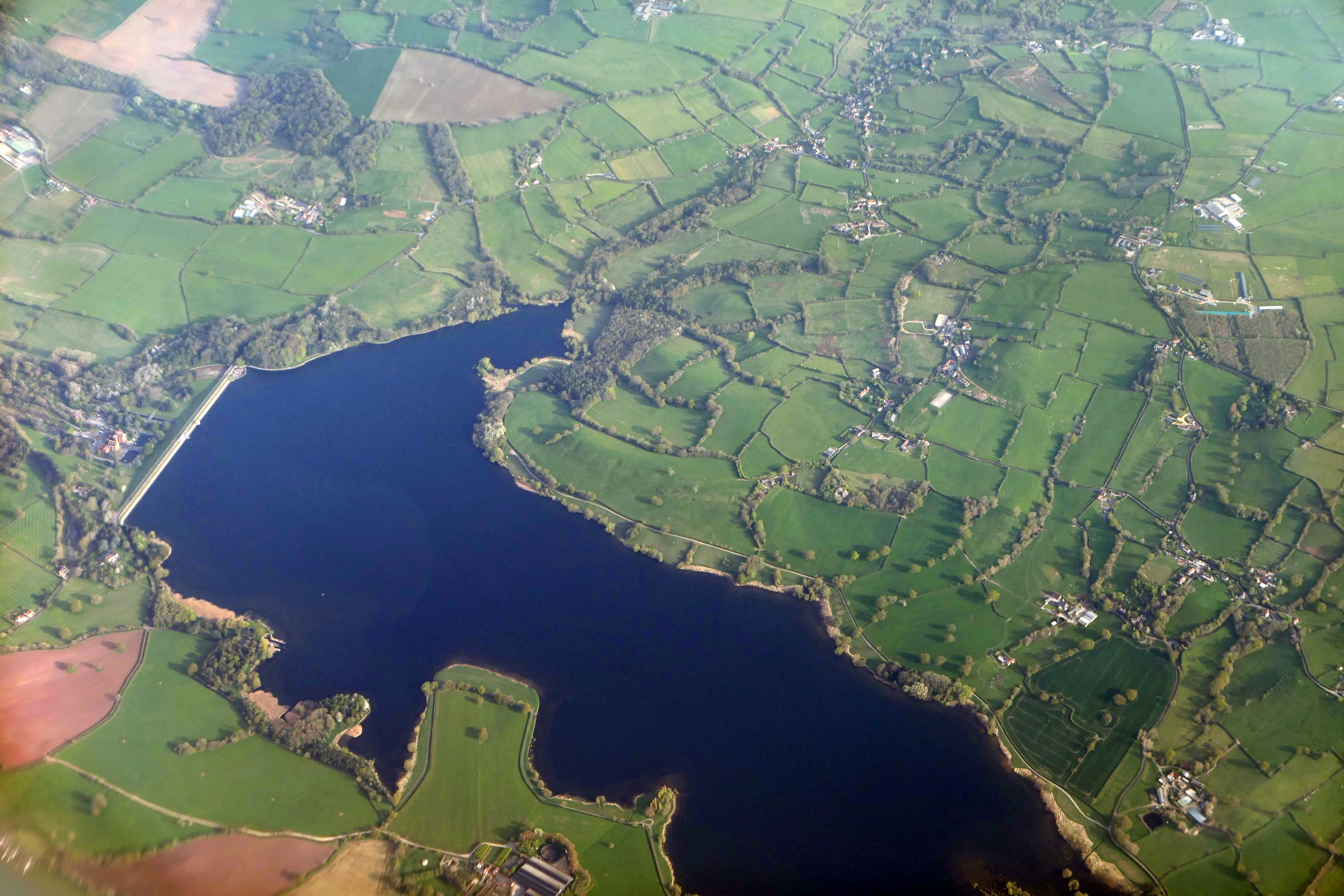
Aerial view of most of Blagdon lake, including the dam.

The dam extends 175 ft (53 m) below ground to the solid rock underlying the valley. It was built of puddled clay with a central concrete core and faced with granite on the lake side. A 24-inch-diameter (610 mm) pipe through the dam leads to the pumping station while a larger one is used to remove silt collecting against the dam. A flow of water is maintained in the River Yeo through a compensation channel and an overflow weir and spillway take flood water downstream.

== Pumping station and Visitor Centre ==
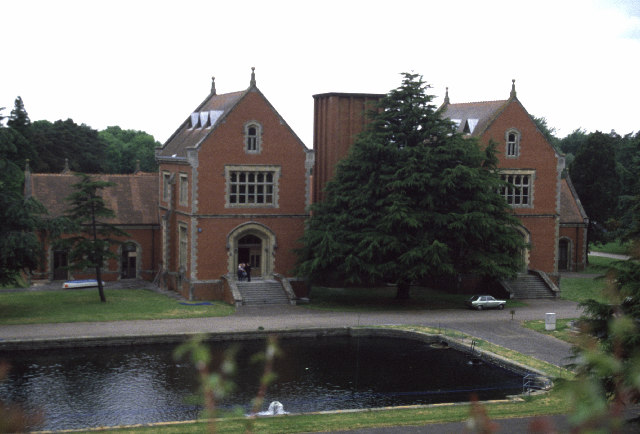
Blagdon pumping station

Blagdon Pumping Station and Visitor Centre includes science and environment exhibits and hands-on displays as well as a room dedicated to the charity WaterAid. One of the two steam-driven beam engines is still working occasionally. Outside this is space for picnics and a nature trail.

When the lake first opened there were four Woolf compound rotative beam pumping engines, housed in two separate buildings. They were built by Glenfield & Kennedy of Kilmarnock between 1900 and 1905. The engine's beam is 34 ft (10.36 m) long and weighs 17 tons. The flywheel is 20 ft (6.10 m) in diameter and weighs 20 tons, having a crank throw of 3.5 ft (1.07 m). Each beam engine had an output of 170 horsepower (130 kW) at 17 rpm. The high-pressure cylinders, 21 inches (53.3 cm) in diameter and with a 3.25 ft (0.99 m) stroke, were supplied by steam from horizontal Lancashire-type twin flue boilers with Green's economisers at 100 pounds per square inch (6.9 bar). The low-pressure cylinder was 34 inches (86.4 cm) in diameter and has a 7 ft (2.13 m) stroke. Three engines with a fourth on standby could pump water at a rate of 7.5 million imperial gallons (34,000 m^{3}) per day, whilst the boilers consumed 8.5 tons of coal per day. A mechanical efficiency of 90% was claimed, the 30-inch (76.2 cm) diameter pump bucket, 3.5 ft (1.07 m) strike and plunger diameter of 21 inches (53.3 cm) gave a pump output of 107 imperial gallons (490 L) per stroke. They ran until 1949, when two engines from the north engine house were replaced by electric pumps. In 1950 automatic shutdown equipment was installed to prevent damage in the event of a burst main or overloading of the new electric pumps. This meant that it was no longer essential to have staff on site 24 hours a day. The decorative chimney was shortened in the 1960s. In 2014 new split-case vertical pumps and various other new equipment was installed to replace those installed in the 1940s and 1950s.

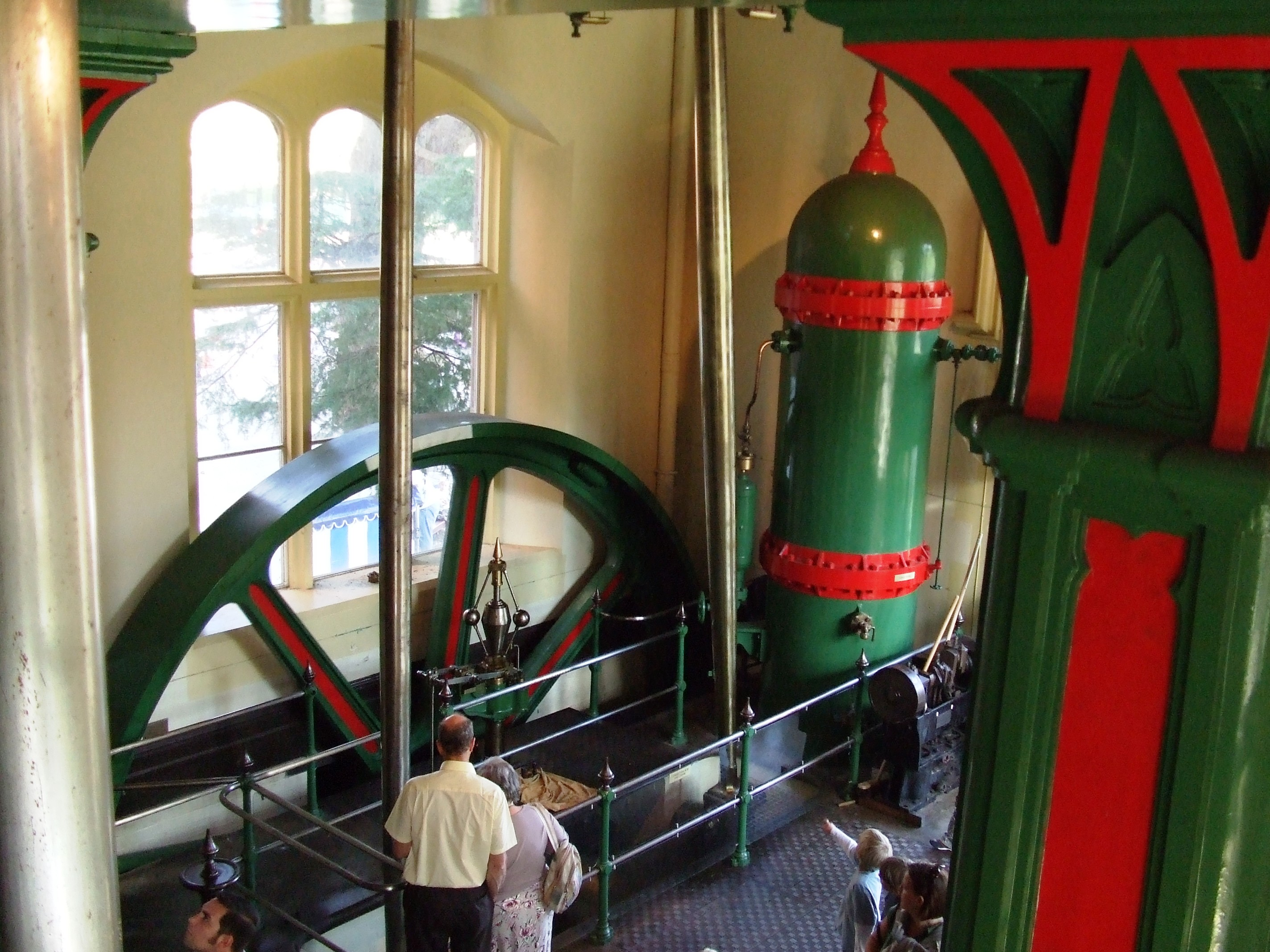
The flywheel

In 1984 it was decided to preserve the two remaining engines and incorporate them as the central feature in the Visitor Centre, including a museum in the old boiler house, which opened in 1988 and attracts over 30,000 visitors a year. The flywheel is now driven by an electric motor. The pumping station is now a Grade II* listed building, while the Gothic-style meter house is Grade II listed and used as a bat sanctuary.

== Fishing ==
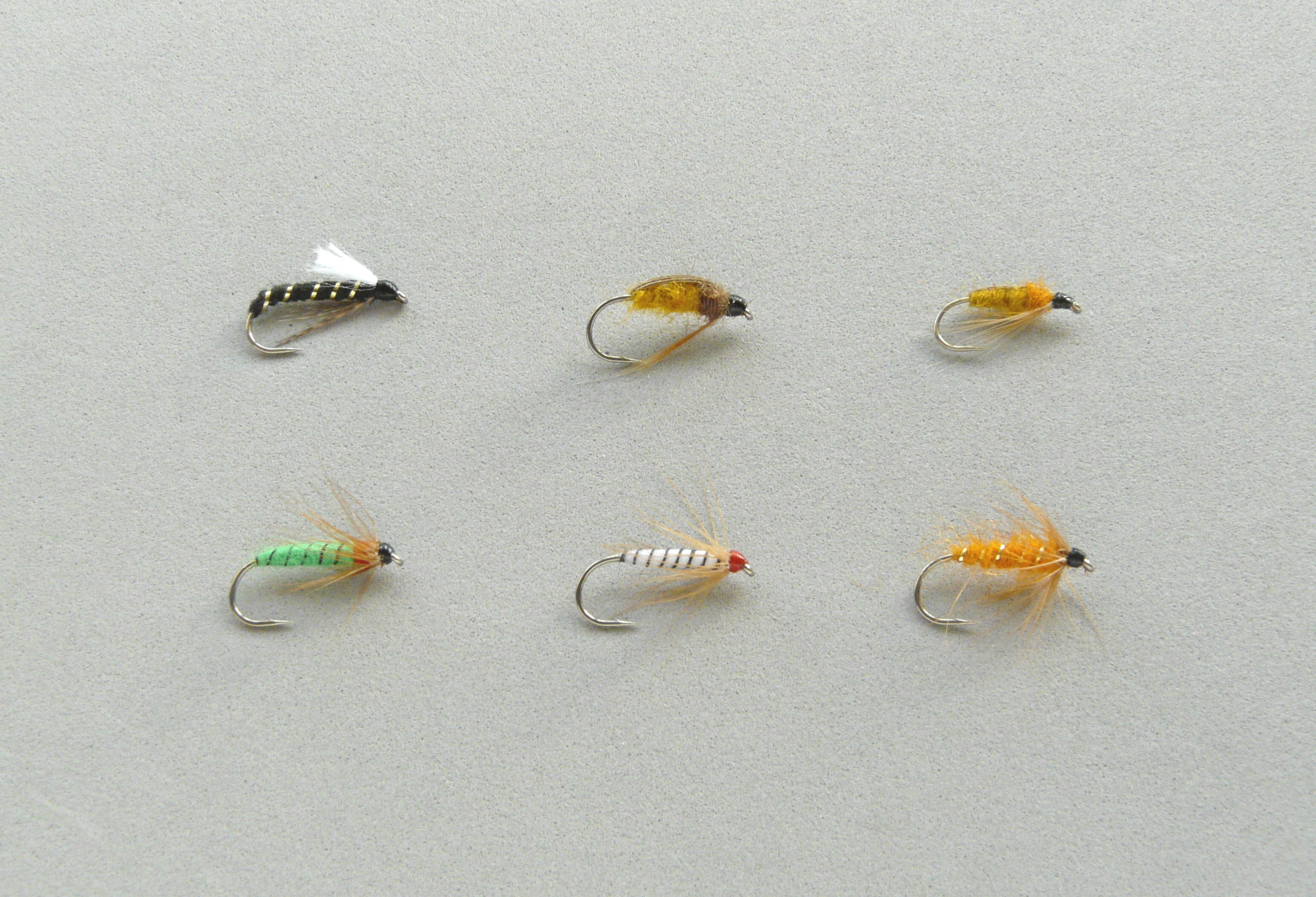
Nymph fly patterns innovated by Dr Bell of Wrington for use at Blagdon

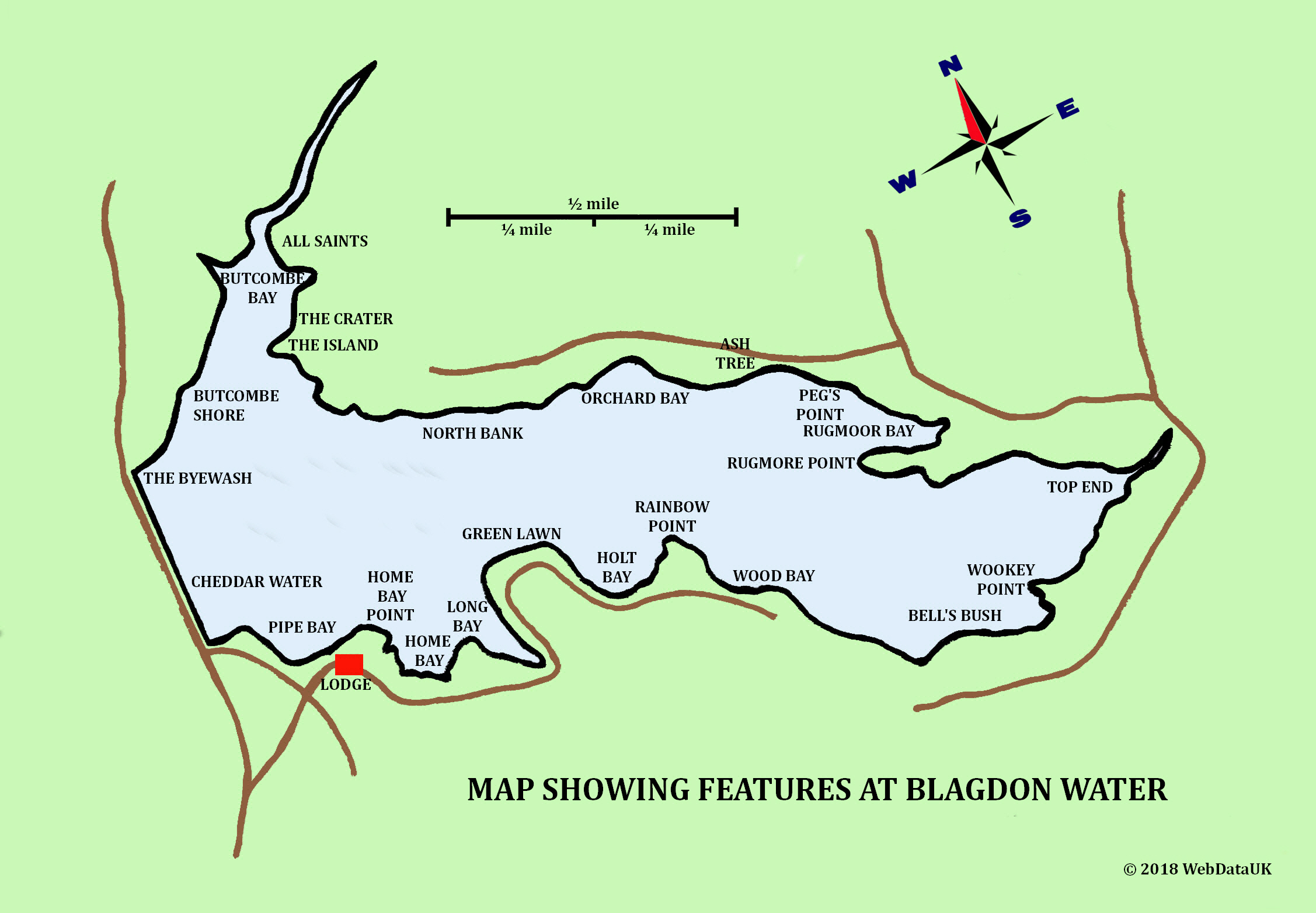
Angler's Map of Blagdon Lake

Blagdon Lake first opened as a trout fishery in 1904. The lake is well known for trout fishing from its banks and the fleet of 18 rowing boats for hire. The suction tanks which originally supplied water to the steam boilers for the pumping engines are now used as rearing pools for the fish before they are transferred into the lake. On average 50,000 trout are reared at Blagdon each year by Bristol Water to stock this and surrounding lakes such as Chew Valley Lake and the Barrow Tanks.

== Ecology ==
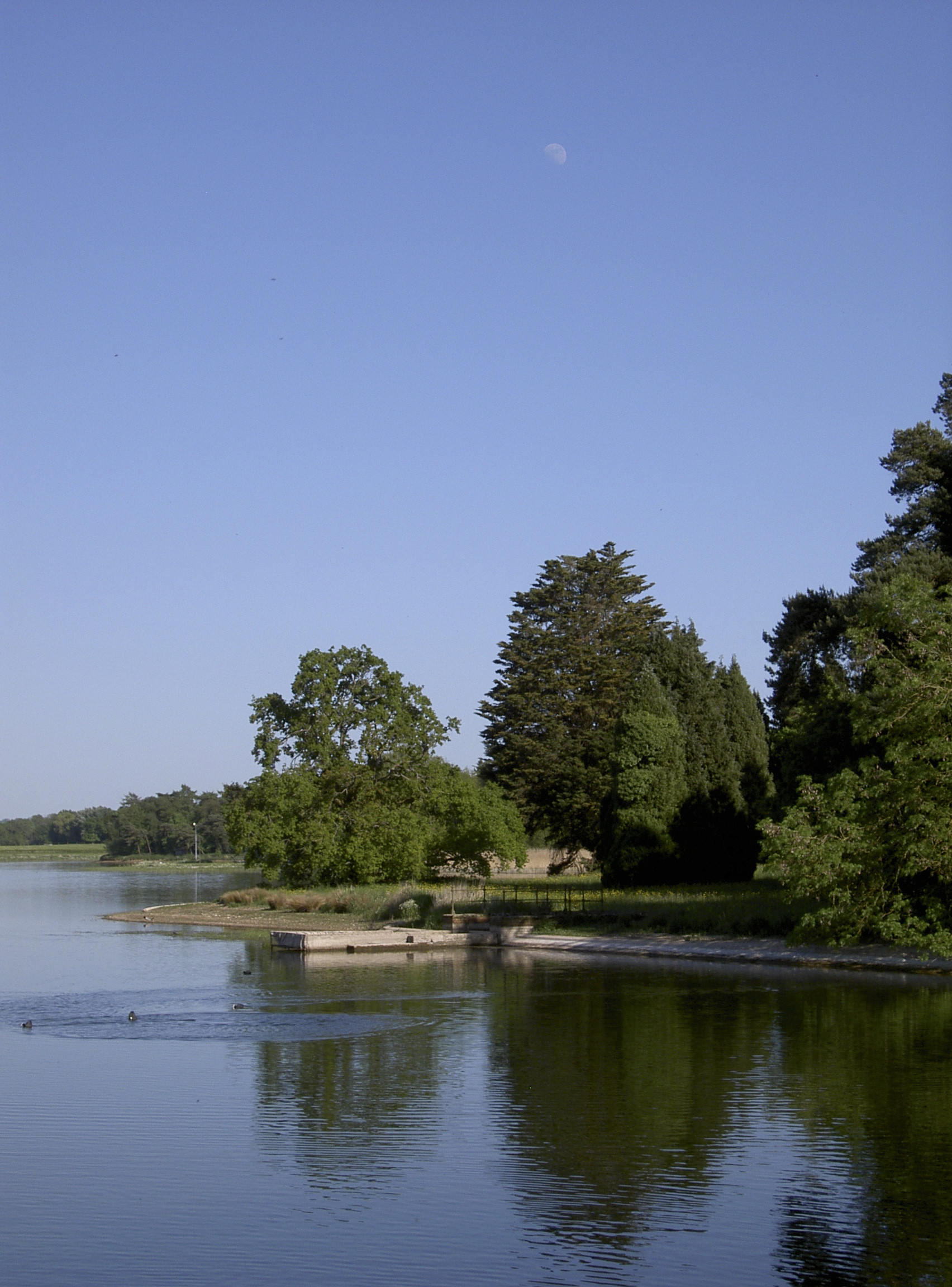
The lakeside with trees

Blagdon Lake is designated a Site of Special Scientific Interest (SSSI) of 212.7 hectares (526 acres), created in 1971, largely because of the variety of species and habitats. The area around the pumping station was laid out as an ornamental woodland which includes Scots pine, cedar, larch, spruce, oak, beech, chestnut, willow, lime, holly and maple. A variety of orchids including green-winged orchid (Anacamptis morio) and southern marsh-orchids can be seen on the borders of the lake.

A variety of water birds can be seen around the lake including: great crested grebe (Podiceps cristatus) and little grebe (Tachybaptus ruficollis), cormorant (Phalacrocoracidae), mute swan (Cygnus olor), Canada goose (Branta canadensis), duck (Anatidae), shoveller (Anas clypeata) and gadwall (Anas strepera). Common buzzards (Buteo buteo) can be seen on the surrounding hills and both Eurasian sparrowhawk (Accipiter nisus) and kestrel breed. Occasional visitors include: osprey (Pandion haeliatis), goshawk (Accipiter gentilis), Eurasian hobby (Falco subbuteo), nuthatch and great spotted woodpecker (Dendrocopos major). The ruddy darter dragonfly (Sympetrum sanguineum) can also be seen. In the wood at the western end of the lake there are populations of badgers, roe deer (Capreolus capreolus) and foxes.
