= Redhill, Somerset =

Village in Somerset, England

Coordinates: 51.366979°N 2.725859°W

Redhill
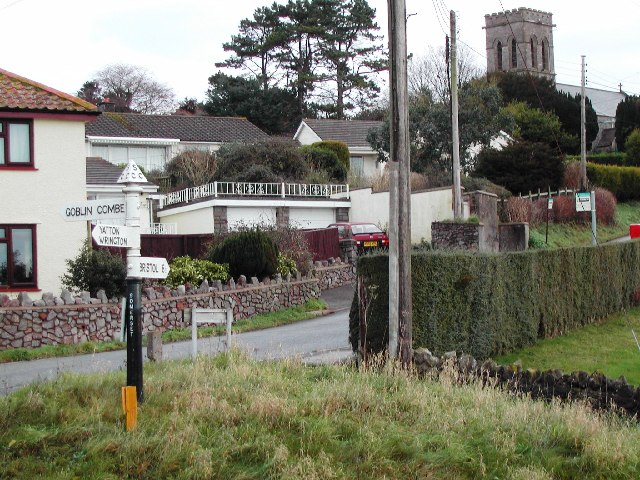
- Redhill village and church

- Location within Somerset
- Population: 308 (2011 census)
- OS grid reference: ST495633
- Civil parish: Wrington
- Unitary authority: North Somerset
- Ceremonial county: Somerset
- Region: South West
- Country: England
- Sovereign state: United Kingdom
- Post town: BRISTOL
- Postcode district: BS40
- Dialling code: 01934
- Police: Avon and Somerset
- Fire: Avon
- Ambulance: South Western
- UK Parliament: North Somerset

Redhill is a compact village at the foot of a 173 m (AOD) hill of the same name to its east and north-east. Its lower level local authority is the civil parish of Wrington which is in North Somerset, England. It straddles the A38 Bridgwater-Bristol Road. It is about 8 miles (12.9 km) SSW of Bristol and close to Bristol Airport.

== History ==
The earliest record of the name Redhill that has been found is on Day & Master's map of Somerset from as late as 1782. The name may simply derive from the appearance of the unmetalled road up the hill, with deep cartwheel ruts scored into the red earth. Alternatively the name may mean Roe Hill or Roe Hollow, alluding to the roe deer which are still plentiful in the area. Some dictionaries give the name as deriving from Ragiol, a village featured in the Domesday Book of 1086; this however, seems more likely to be Regil or Ridgehill.

=== Prehistory ===
There are at least three prehistoric structures in Redhill. There were at least six barrows here, though the mounds are less than 3 feet (91 cm) high. A nearby long barrow is crossed by a field boundary at one end, and only about 2 feet (61 cm) high. There are also remains of a burial chamber just south of Bristol Airport. The mound is almost gone but the cover slab remains – with a hollow in it that collects the rainwater, giving its name The Water Stone – burial chamber.

Just south of the village, in the deep hollow and a quarter of a mile beyond the church is Lye Hole, where there is a stream of water, which runs into the Congresbury Yeo. It was the site, in July 1876 of the discovery of the remains of a Roman villa. At Lye Hole the enclosure system, often referred to as fields, implying that they represent cultivated infields, around the villa survives and is made up of long, rather narrow fields around 30 metres (98 ft) broad. This was a settlement of the late Roman or Roman-Saxon era.

=== Saxon and medieval period ===
By late Saxon times and at the Norman Conquest in 1066, what is now known as Redhill comprised two of the three tythings of the Manor of Wrington ("Weritone"). These were Lye Hole, to the East of the main Bridgwater Road, adjoining Butcombe and Broadfield Down, to the West.

In the middle 13th century, a detailed list of the tenants of the manor shows 104 people holding from three to 40 acres (16 ha) each; eight cottagers with a garden; three millers who also had land; one priest and four freeholders. There were some very small enclosed fields (called "crofts", "closes" or "paddocks" beside outlying farmsteads on Broadfield Down and in the Lye Cross and Lye Hole area.

In the middle of the 16th century Calamine, a zinc ore, was found at Broadfield Down. It was then taken down the Banwell River and floated across the Bristol Channel to Tintern for smelting. With the use of gunpowder in the 17th century the extractions speeded up. Iron ore has been found during the excavations at Row of Ashes, on the boundary between Redhill and Butcombe, in the 1970s. Ore extraction and purification often utilised washing and settling lagoons, called buddles. Lye Hole Farm was referred to, as "the Washing Pool" or "at the Buddles" and there is still a field on Lye Hole Farm, called 'Uddles', which has a spring in it.

=== Growth of the village ===
The A38 has been one of the main links between Bristol and the South West of England since medieval days. It may even have far earlier roots – linking the Roman settlement near Bristol with that at Exeter. Local roads prior to the 18th century were poor. For Redhill and the Bridgwater Road (A38), the first attempt to form a Turnpike Trusts was made in 1727 and again in 1731. Both were frustrated by local opposition, but the necessary Act (for Bristol) was eventually passed. John Macadam was appointed Surveyor to the Bristol Turnpike Trust in 1816 and his new process of covering the roads with a layer of crushed stone bound with tar and rolled smooth was quickly copied by all the other trusts. The Bell Inn (subsequently the Darlington Arms) provided facilities the stabling, watering and changing of horses, and carters cottages were built along the road.

The nucleus of the present village arose at the crossroads of what is now Church Road, Winters Lane, Long Lane and The Pound – which was so called because it was there that drovers would keep their livestock overnight as they travelled to market in Bristol. Winters Lane is thought to have once been the main road of Redhill leading up to the ancient settlement in Goblin Combe. The lane was also called "The Old Drove Road" and is still called "Cooks Bridle Path" at its far end where it enters Brockley Combe. It was "uncut" or unsurfaced until the 1920s.

Many of the houses in the present village were built in the 20th century, but others – especially the farms – date back much further. Goblin Combe Farm, for instance, dates back to 1858. Scars Farm was built in 1884. Worship Farm was built in the 19th century. Quarry Farm, was built around 1900. Redhill Village Hall was built in 1911, with a gift of land and funds from Mr Henry Herbert Wills (of the W. D. & H. O. Wills tobacco family) family and furnished by the villagers. The Village Store used to be at "Banwells", opposite the Darlington Arms. A branch of the County Library was opened at the school in 1938 which was later replaced by a mobile van. Redcroft, a cul-de-sac off Winters Lane, consists of six houses and the parsonage – all built around 1910 or 1911, the houses for the estate workers of Mr Henry Herbert Wills of Barley Wood, who had purchased much of the Wrington Estate on the death of the Fourth Duke of Cleveland (died 1891) when the estate was sold by auction (in 1896). Ashford Road (built in the 1930s) was originally planned to comprise 60 houses but the majority were never built.

=== Second World War ===
During World War II evacuees from London and Bristol were billeted in the village and the village hall was used for evacuees from Bristol air raids and as the HQ for the local Home Guard. Early in the 1939–1945 war, farmers on Broadfield Down received notice from the War Office that their land was to be taken over and used as a Royal Air Force (RAF) station. It was used throughout the war. In 1956, it was eventually purchased by Bristol City Council to become what is now Bristol Airport.

After the Second World War electricity and mains water came to Redhill. Redacre, a cul-de-sac of six houses and bungalows, was built in 1964–65 by local builder William Vowles, who also built many other houses in the village.

=== 21st century ===
In September 2008, a memorial concert for the singer Ian Stuart Donaldson of the neo-Nazi band Skrewdriver, attended by 800 people, was held in the 2-acre (8,100 m^{2}) fields of "The Bungalow Inn" public house. A marquee for the weekend-long billed "scooter and music festival" was erected by the Bungalow, after being contracted by record company "ISD records", which bills itself as the world's "oldest and most dependable White Nationalist Movement CD label." The actual neo-Nazi-themed event was filmed by local residents, who have on video shouts of Sieg Heil from the rally inside "The Bungalow Inn" pub premises. At least two families resultantly fled their adjacent homes due to this and other bad behaviour. The owners of "The Bungalow" pub have been investigated before for smaller events, and the licensing of the event and other incidents are presently being investigated by Avon and Somerset Police.

== Governance ==
Wrington parish council has responsibility for local issues, including setting an annual precept (local rate) to cover the council's operating costs and producing annual accounts for public scrutiny. The parish council evaluates local planning applications and works with the local police, district council officers, and neighbourhood watch groups on matters of crime, security, and traffic. The parish council's role also includes initiating projects for the maintenance and repair of parish facilities, such as the village hall or community centre, playing fields and playgrounds, as well as consulting with the district council on the maintenance, repair, and improvement of highways, drainage, footpaths, public transport, and street cleaning. Conservation matters (including trees and listed buildings) and environmental issues are also of interest to the council.

The parish falls within the unitary authority of North Somerset which was created in 1996, as established by the Local Government Act 1992. Between 1 April 1974 and 1 April 1996, it was the Woodspring district of the county of Avon. Before 1974 that the parish was part of the Axbridge Rural District.

The parish is represented in the House of Commons of the Parliament of the United Kingdom as part of the North Somerset constituency. It elects one member of parliament (MP) by the first past the post system of election, currently Liam Fox of the Conservative Party.

== Geography ==
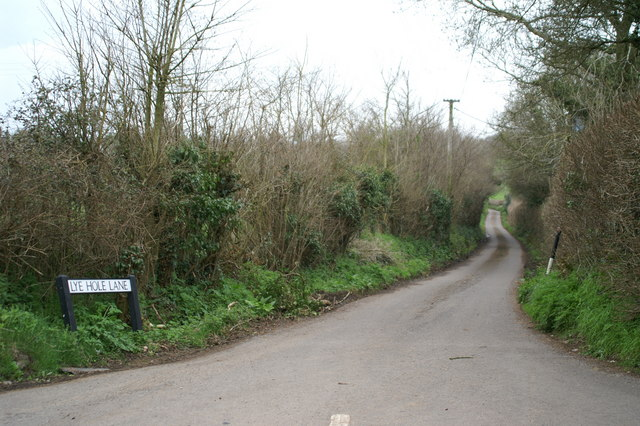
Lye Hole Lane

At the foot of Sutton Hill a brook rises nearby and flows past Lye Hole and Cowslip Green to join the River Yeo near Perry Bridge on the A38, Bridgwater Road .

== Education ==
There was probably a school at Broadfield from the latter part of the 18th century, and a cottage, now demolished, called "The Old School House". The fees were one penny a week. This dame school was run by a Mrs Saunders for 19 years until the building of the new one in 1874. The school, built in 1874 cost £811.12s 6d, plus £50 for the architect, and was opened by the Bishop of Bath and Wells. The Duke of Cleveland, who owned the major part of Wrington Parish, gave the site. School numbers varied over the years from 105 in 1879 to 17 in 1937. By this time it had become a Junior School (as from 1927). The classrooms were heated by tortoise stoves until the arrival of night storage heaters. Redhill School had its centenary celebrations in 1975. Falling numbers of children of school age finally led to the decision being made to close the School on 20 July 1984

== Culture ==
Redhill hosts an annual Harvest Home festival. More than 50% of the community as at the 2011 census stated that they were Christian: 195 residents; the other faiths professed were no religion (32 residents) and Judaism and Islam with one resident of each of those faiths.

== Religious sites ==
Before Christ Church was built in Redhill, worshippers had to go down to All Saints Church in Wrington, while from 1715 non-conformists used their own building.

Christ Church, Redhill's chapel of ease was first erected in 1843 and consecrated in the following year by the Bishop of Salisbury. Built by James Wilson it is of Lancet style, with a west tower, a nave without aisles and a short chancel. The local inhabitants met its cost, with the Rector John Vane contributing the entire cost of the chancel, porch and tower. It has been designated by English Heritage as a Grade II listed building,

Its exposure to the prevailing west winds meant that rain was soon permeating the porous local limestone. In 1869, the church had to be closed so that the walls could be lined with pitch and replastered inside. The board in the church porch states that there were "315 seats, 250 of which are hereby declared to be free and unappropriated for ever". A new organ was installed in 1888 at a cost of £200.
