= Lulsgate Plateau =

Outlier of the Mendip Hills in North Somerset, England

Coordinates: 51°22′N 2°43′W

Lulsgate Plateau is the name given to the Carboniferous Limestone hills which form a northern outlier of the Mendip Hills, southwest of Bristol, England, approximately 600 feet (180 m) above sea level, which has been occupied since prehistoric times.

The major feature on the plateau is Bristol International Airport. Cutting into the western edge of the plateau are two combes, Brockley Combe and Goblin Combe a 52 hectares (128 acres) biological Site of Special Scientific Interest (SSSI). There are two major roads in the area — the A38 cuts across the top of the plateau, while the A370 runs along its western edge. Both run in a southwesterly direction, and join Bristol to the towns and villages of North Somerset, Weston-super-Mare and the M5 motorway. To the west of the plateau are the North Somerset Levels, to the south is the Yeo valley and to the east is the Chew Valley.
