= Cleeve, Somerset =

Village in Somerset, England

Coordinates: 51°23′20″N 2°46′45″W

Cleeve
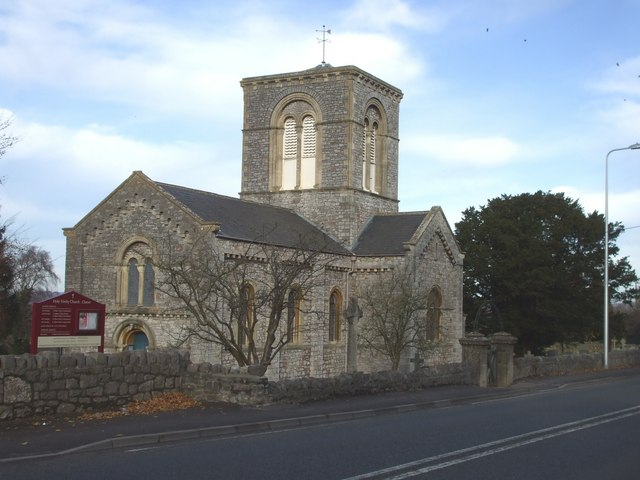
- Church Of Holy Trinity, Cleeve

- Location within Somerset
- Population: 902
- OS grid reference: ST461660
- Unitary authority: North Somerset
- Ceremonial county: Somerset
- Region: South West
- Country: England
- Sovereign state: United Kingdom
- Post town: Bristol
- Postcode district: BS49
- Dialling code: 01934
- Police: Avon and Somerset
- Fire: Avon
- Ambulance: South Western
- UK Parliament: North Somerset
- Website: http://www.cleevevillage.co.uk

Cleeve is a village and civil parish in the ceremonial county of Somerset, England. It is situated within the unitary authority of North Somerset, 9 miles (14 km) south west of Bristol and has a population of 902 (2011 census).

== Toponymy ==
The name Cleeve, first attested in 1243 as Clive, comes from the dative singular form of the Old English word clif ('cliff, bank, steep hill').

== History ==
Bronze or Iron Age hill forts have been identified north of Goblin Combe close to the village at Cleeve Toot in Cleeve Wood. It is a roughly oval settlement which is approximately 125 metres (410 ft) in length by 90 metres (300 ft) in breadth. Approximately 150 metres (490 ft) to the north is another, smaller settlement. They are thought to have been a satellite community of nearby Cadbury Hill Pits have been found at the site indicating the presence of round houses. There is a single stone rampart with a broad shallow outer ditch. There is also a prehistoric or Roman field system.

== Governance ==
The parish council has responsibility for local issues, including setting an annual precept (local rate) to cover the council's operating costs and producing annual accounts for public scrutiny. The parish council evaluates local planning applications and works with the local police, district council officers, and neighbourhood watch groups on matters of crime, security, and traffic. The parish council's role also includes initiating projects for the maintenance and repair of parish facilities, such as the village hall or community centre, playing fields and playgrounds, as well as consulting with the district council on the maintenance, repair, and improvement of highways, drainage, footpaths, public transport, and street cleaning. Conservation matters (including trees and listed buildings) and environmental issues are also of interest to the council.

The parish falls within the unitary authority of North Somerset which was created in 1996, as established by the Local Government Act 1992. It provides a single tier of local government with responsibility for almost all local government functions within its area including local planning and building control, local roads, council housing, environmental health, markets and fairs, refuse collection, recycling, cemeteries, crematoria, leisure services, parks, and tourism. It is also responsible for education, social services, libraries, main roads, public transport, trading standards, waste disposal and strategic planning, although fire, police and ambulance services are provided jointly with other authorities through the Avon Fire and Rescue Service, Avon and Somerset Constabulary and the South Western Ambulance Service.

North Somerset's area covers part of the ceremonial county of Somerset but it is administered independently of the non-metropolitan county. Its administrative headquarters is in the town hall in Weston-super-Mare. Between 1 April 1974 and 1 April 1996, it was the Woodspring district of the county of Avon. Before 1974 that the parish was part of the Long Ashton Rural District.

The parish is represented in the House of Commons of the Parliament of the United Kingdom as part of the North Somerset constituency. It elects one Member of Parliament (MP) by the first past the post system of election, currently Liam Fox of the Conservative Party. It was also part of the South West England constituency of the European Parliament prior to Britain leaving the European Union in January 2020, which elected seven MEPs using the d'Hondt method of party-list proportional representation.

== Geography ==
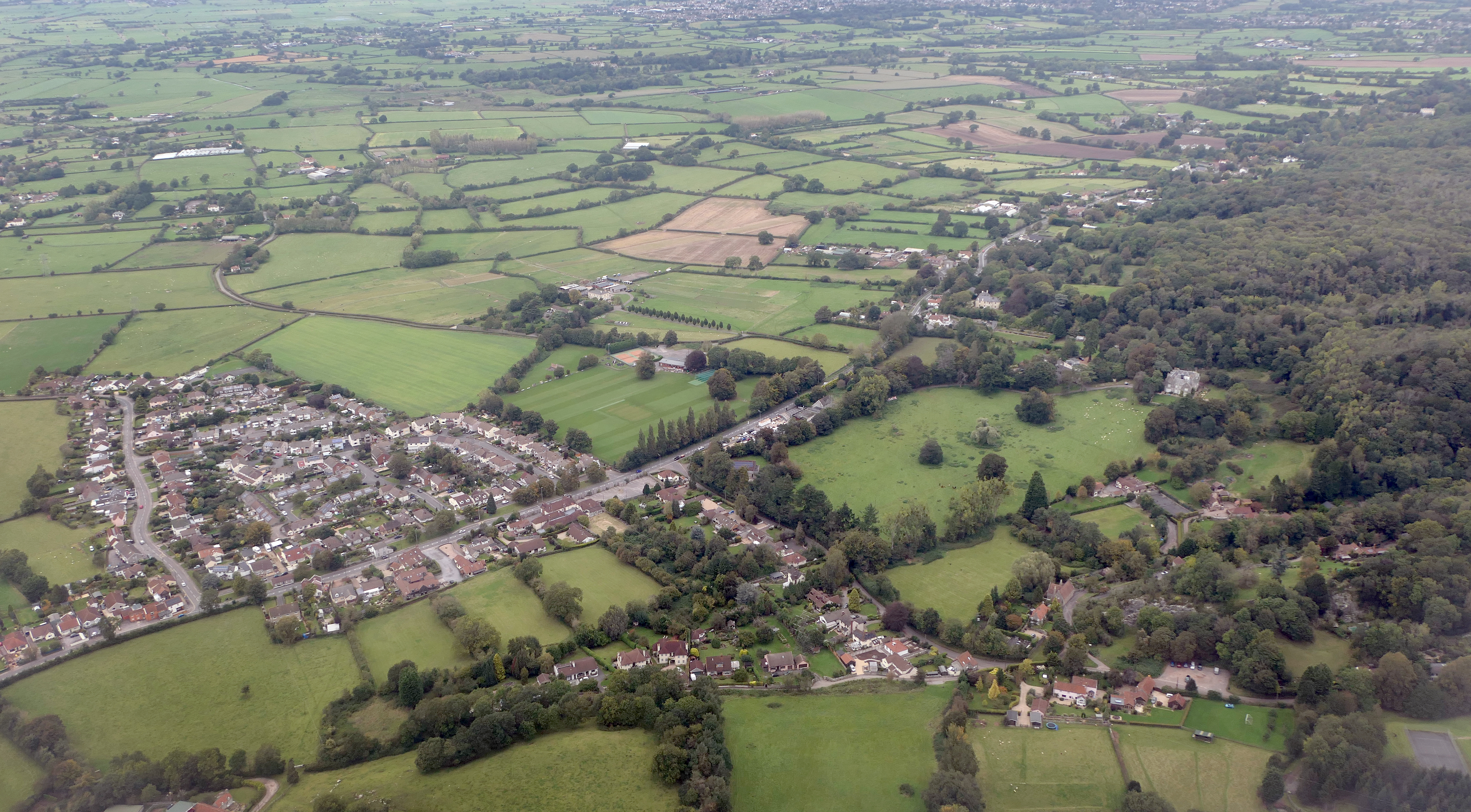
Aerial view

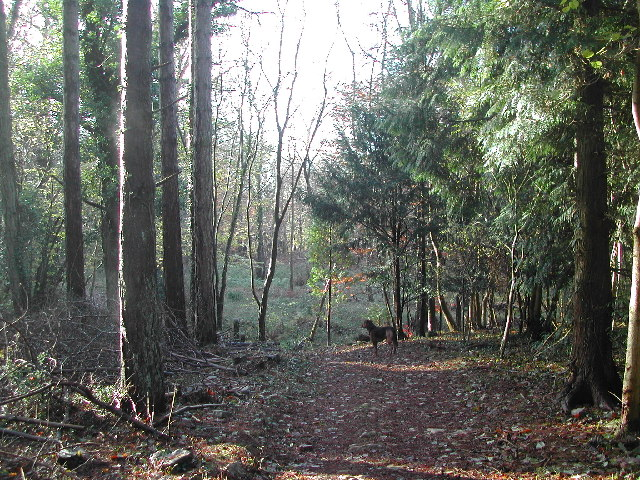
King's Wood

Overlooking the village are several hills and valleys which support a rich diversity of wildlife.

Goblin Combe is a 52 hectares (128 acres) biological Site of Special Scientific Interest (SSSI) originally notified in 1999, with 9 hectares (22 acres) being managed as a nature reserve by the Avon Wildlife Trust. A population of the nationally scarce plant stinking hellebore (Helleborus foetidus) grows on scree slopes in the combe, near Cleeve Toot; it is native at this site. Limestone fern (Gymnocarpum robertianum), another nationally scarce plant, is also found here on limestone scree. Other flowers include the autumn gentian, autumn ladies'-tresses and yellow-wort. The site also supports a varied collection of butterflies, with over 30 species recorded. These include grizzled and dingy skippers, brown argus and green hairstreak.

King's Wood and Urchin Wood SSSI also overlooks the village. It is a 128.1 hectare biological Site of Special Scientific Interest. The site has long been renowned for its botanical interest and records date back to the County Flora of 1893. The woodland supports a particularly high diversity of vascular plants, including populations of the nationally rare plant purple gromwell (Lithospermum purpurocaeruleum) and the scarce angular Solomon's seal (Polygonatum odoratum). Large areas of King's Wood were replanted during the 1960s with beech (Fagus sylvatica) and a variety of conifer species including Douglas fir (Pseudotsuga menziesii), Lawson's cypress (Chamaecyparis lawsoniana) and Norway spruce (Picea abies) . These crop trees have, however, largely been unsuccessful and the replanted areas are now being overtaken by hardwoods. King's Wood supports nationally important populations of the rare and endangered greater horseshoe bat (Rhinolophus ferrumequinum) and dormice (Muscardinus avellanarius), and a nationally scarce chrysomelid beetle (Clytra quadripunctata).

Cleeve Heronry is a heronry in a woodland near the village. 40 nests were counted in 1994. 47 nests in 2007. CCTV from one of the nests can be viewed at Cleeve Nursery in spring while the birds are raising chicks. An area of 3.2 hectares is owned by Avon Wildlife Trust.

=== Climate ===
Along with the rest of South West England, Cleeve has a temperate climate which is generally wetter and milder than the rest of the country. The annual mean temperature is approximately 10 °C (50.0 °F). Seasonal temperature variation is less extreme than most of the United Kingdom because of the adjacent sea temperatures. The summer months of July and August are the warmest with mean daily maxima of approximately 21 °C (69.8 °F). In winter mean minimum temperatures of 1 °C (33.8 °F) or 2 °C (35.6 °F) are common. In the summer the Azores high pressure affects the south-west of England, however convective cloud sometimes forms inland, reducing the number of hours of sunshine. Annual sunshine rates are slightly less than the regional average of 1,600 hours. In December 1998 there were 20 days without sun recorded at Yeovilton. Most of the rainfall in the south-west is caused by Atlantic depressions or by convection. Most of the rainfall in autumn and winter is caused by the Atlantic depressions, which is when they are most active. In summer, a large proportion of the rainfall is caused by sun heating the ground leading to convection and to showers and thunderstorms. Average rainfall is around 700 mm (28 in). About 8–15 days of snowfall is typical. November to March have the highest mean wind speeds, and June to August have the lightest winds. The predominant wind direction is from the south-west.

== Economy ==
Many of the residents of Cleeve commute to Bristol for work.

== Businesses ==
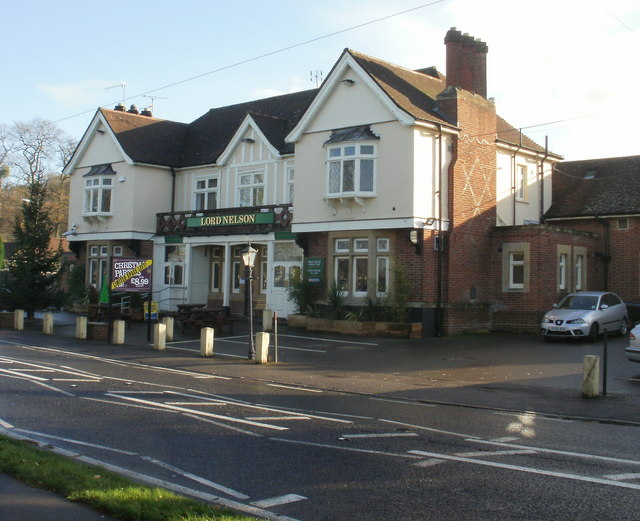
Lord Nelson public house

The village has a number of businesses, including a beauty salon, plant nursery, boarding cattery, village shop, restaurant and two takeaways.

== Landmarks ==
The three-storey Cleeve Court was built in a Gothic style for Rev. T.S. Biddulph in the early 19th century. It has been designated as a Grade II listed building.

The Lord Nelson Inn, opened 1936, was the most striking and conspicuous landmark building in the centre of Cleeve and well known to travellers on the A370. It was built between 1935–36 to directly replace a public house by the same name, constructed circa 1799. The current building, designed by R. Edwards for Bristol George's & Co. Brewery, was a rare local example of an interwar 'reformed' or 'improved' public house still retaining original facade and grounds, complete with function room, skittle alley and rear garden. Latterly owned by Greene King, the pub closed in late 2016. Threatened with demolition by a supermarket and petrol station company, the pub and grounds were designated as an Asset of Community Value under the Localism Act (2011) by North Somerset Council in January 2017. For a period, the empty building was fenced off, and a spray painted 'save our bats' message was on the fence, in protest of demolition. The pub was ultimately demolished in 2021.

== Transport ==
Cleeve is on the A370 road and close to the railway line from Bristol to Weston-super-Mare, with the nearest station being Yatton railway station on a branch of the Bristol to Taunton Line. It provides two trains in each direction each hour. One service shuttles between Bristol Parkway and Weston-super-Mare, calling at most stations via Bristol Temple Meads; the second is the faster Cardiff Central to Taunton service.

The village is 3 miles (5 km) from Bristol International Airport.

== Education ==
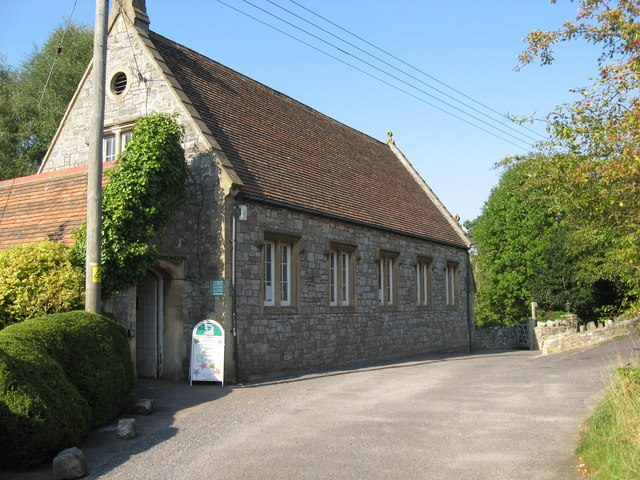
Former school in Goblin Combe

The original village school was in the building now used for the Goblin Combe Environment Centre but, in the 1970s, was replaced by the Court De Wyck Church of England Primary School which serves both Cleeve and the neighbouring village of Claverham.

Secondary education is not available in the village so many of Cleeve's children attend Backwell School in the nearby village of Backwell. The school is a specialist Arts College, and includes a sixth form and takes pupils from the age of 11 (Year 7) to the age of 18 (Year 13). The school's original building dates from 1954 In 2009, 71% of GCSE students achieved at least five GCSEs above grade C including English and Maths. In November 2008, Backwell School was rated as outstanding by Ofsted.

== Religious sites ==
Cleeve, along with the village of Kenn, was previously part of the parish of Yatton. When the parish was divided public subscriptions were raised to build a separate church from local stone, with the Smyth Pigott family of Brockley Hall in nearby Brockley being the largest contributor. The foundation stone was laid in 1838 and the building consecrated in 1840. Cleeve became a separate parish of Cleeve with Clavenham, in 1843.

The parish Church of Holy Trinity was built in a Neo-Norman style in 1840 by George Phillips Manners and is designated as a Grade II* listed building. Nave, north and south transepts, crossing tower and chancel. The nave has three bays with recessed bays to the north and south and a two-stage tower. In 1888 the church was restored and renovated, and in 1898 stained glass was added to the west windows.

The parish is part of the Diocese of Bath and Wells and in 2005 won an award as the first Ecocongregation in the Diocese.

== Sport ==
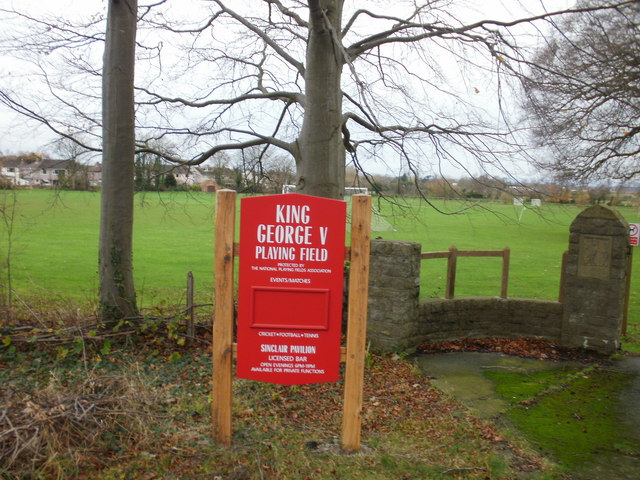
King George V Playing Field sign

At the heart of the village is the King George V Playing Field and Sinclair Pavilion which is home to Cleeve Cricket Club, Yatton & Cleeve United Football Club, and Cleeve Lawn Tennis Club as well as many local skittles teams.

== Notable residents ==
- Cornthwaite Rason (18 June 1858 – 15 March 1927), better known as Hector Rason, was born in the village and later became the seventh Premier of Western Australia.
- Ian Fergusson, BBC weatherman for BBC Points West regional news and forecaster for BBC Sport Formula One, moved to the village in 2014
