= Church of St Bartholomew, Ubley =

Church in Somerset, England

Church of St Bartholomew
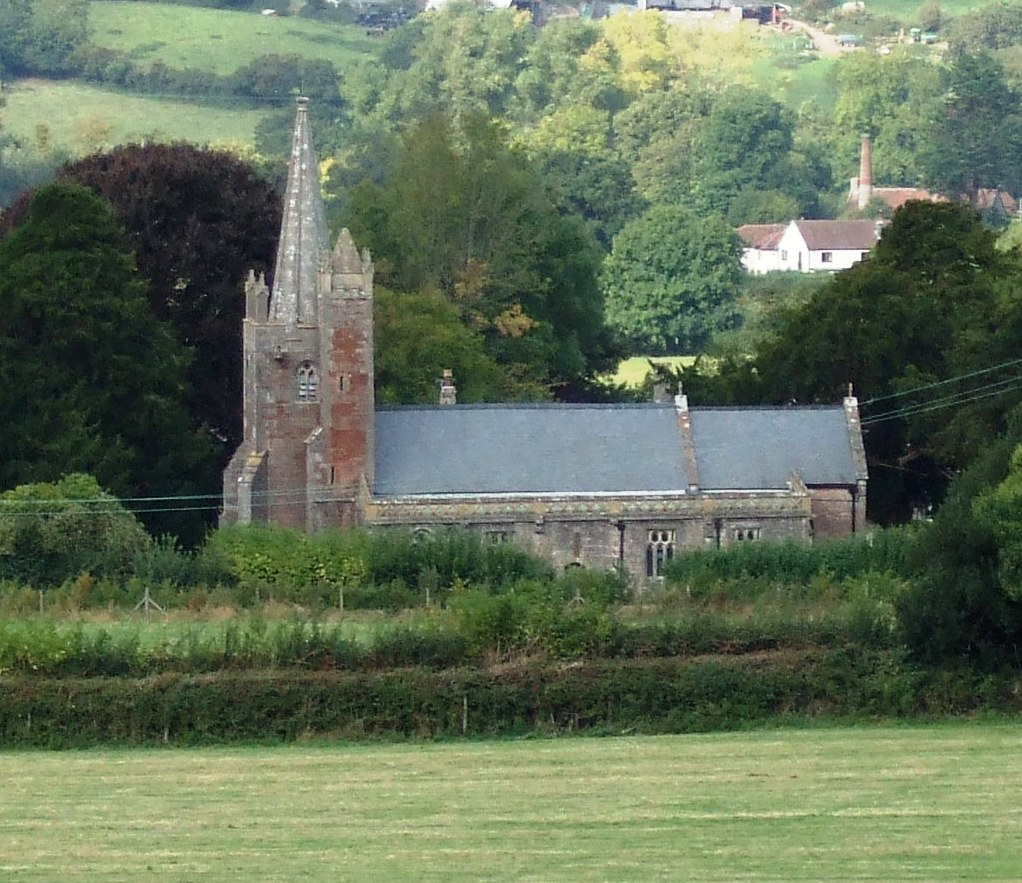

- Location within Somerset
- 51°19′17″N 2°40′36″W
- Location: Ubley, Somerset, England

History
- Built: 13th century

Listed Building – Grade I
- Official name: Church of St Bartholomew
- Designated: 21 September 1960
- Reference no.: 1129654

The Church of St Bartholomew in Ubley, Somerset, England is a small medieval church originating from the 13th century with later additions. It has been designated as a Grade I listed building.

The church has no fixed pews. Features include a Jacobean pulpit and a chained copy of the ‘Paraphrases of Erasmus’ dated 1552. The 13th century stone font stone font has a square bowl. The pulpit is from the 17th century. The stained glass in the east window dates from 1877 and was painted by Jean-Baptiste Capronnier.

On the north side of the church is the remains of a Fives court.

It is part a joint Benefice of Blagdon with Compton Martin which is part of the deanery of Chew Magna and the Archdeaconry of Bath.

== See also ==
- List of Grade I listed buildings in Bath and North East Somerset
- List of towers in Somerset
- List of ecclesiastical parishes in the Diocese of Bath and Wells
