= Cleeve Heronry =

Heronry in Somerset, England

Coordinates: 51.39228°N 2.77319°W

Cleeve Heronry (grid reference ST463662) is a heronry in a woodland near the village of Cleeve in North Somerset. 40 nests were counted in 1994. 47 nests in 2007. CCTV from one of the nests can be viewed at Cleeve Nursery in spring while the birds are raising chicks.

An area of 3.2 hectares is owned by Avon Wildlife Trust.
