= King's Wood and Urchin Wood SSSI =

Protected area in Somerset, England

King's Wood and Urchin Wood
- Site of Special Scientific Interest
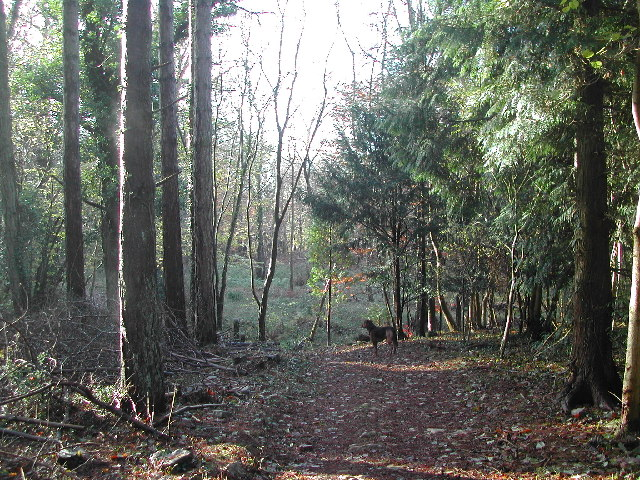

- Location within Somerset
- Location of King's Wood and Urchin Wood.
- Area of search: Avon
- Grid reference: ST454645
- Coordinates: 51.37691°N 2.78586°W
- Interest: Biological
- Area: 128.1 hectares (1.281 km^{2}; 0.495 sq mi)
- Notification date: 1990

King's Wood and Urchin Wood SSSI (grid reference ST454645) is a 128.1 hectare biological Site of Special Scientific Interest near the villages of Cleeve and Congresbury, North Somerset, notified in 1990.

The site has long been renowned for its botanical interest and records date back to the County Flora of 1893. The woodland supports a particularly high diversity of vascular plants, including populations of the nationally rare plant Purple Gromwell (Lithospermum purpurocaeruleum) and the scarce Angular Solomon's seal (Polygonatum odoratum).

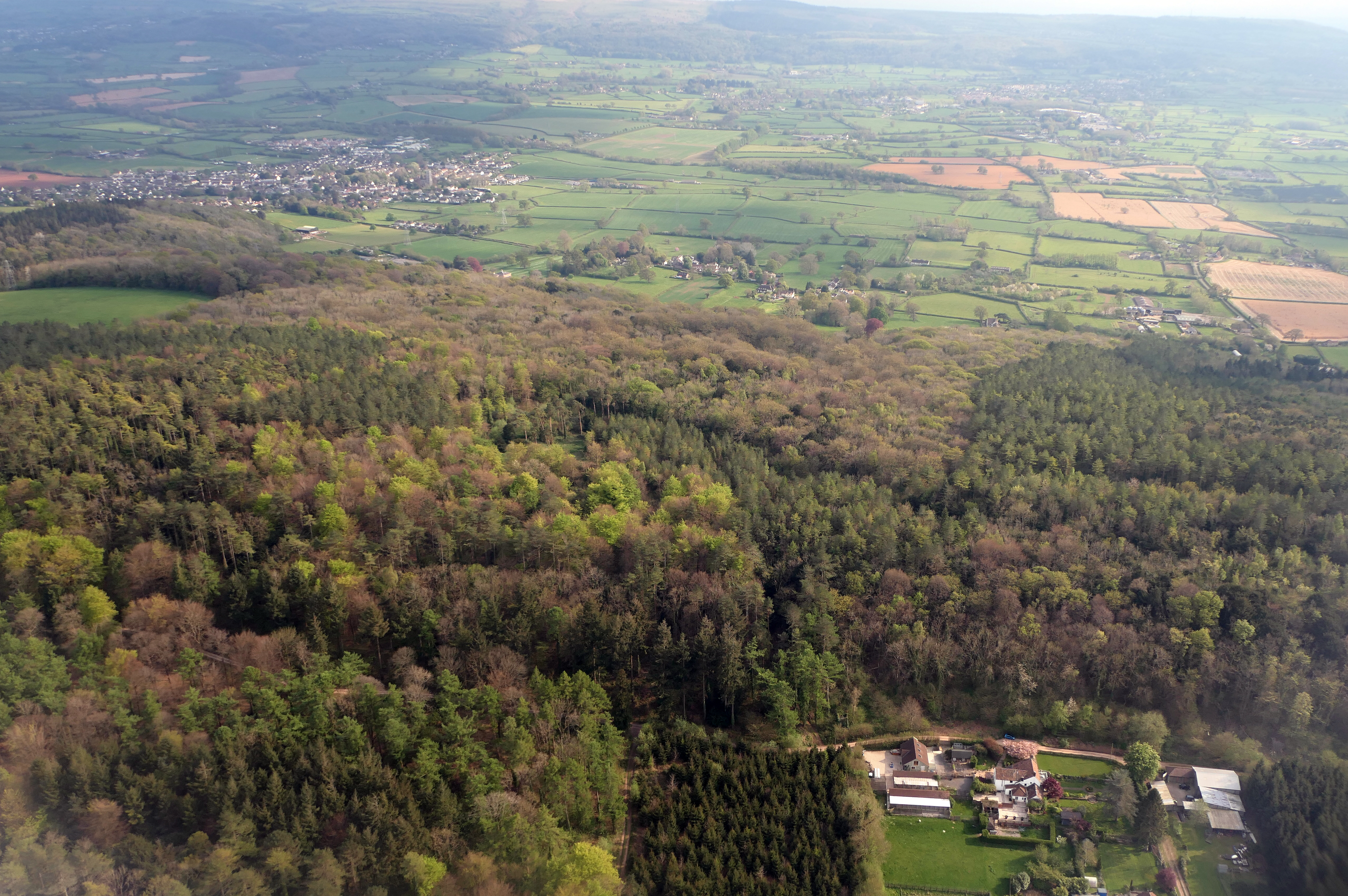
A view over part of King's wood, with Wrington in the distance.

Large areas of King's Wood were replanted during the 1960s with beech Fagus sylvatica and a variety of conifer species including Douglas fir (Pseudotsuga menziesii), Lawson's cypress (Chamaecyparis lawsoniana) and Norway spruce (Picea abies) . These crop trees have, however, largely been unsuccessful and the replanted areas are now being overtaken by hardwoods.

King's Wood supports nationally important populations of the rare and endangered greater horseshoe bat (Rhinolophus ferrumequinum) and dormice (Muscardinus avellanarius), and a nationally scarce Chrysomelid beetle (Clytra quadripunctata).
