= Church of Holy Trinity, Cleeve =

Church in Somerset, England

Church Of Holy Trinity
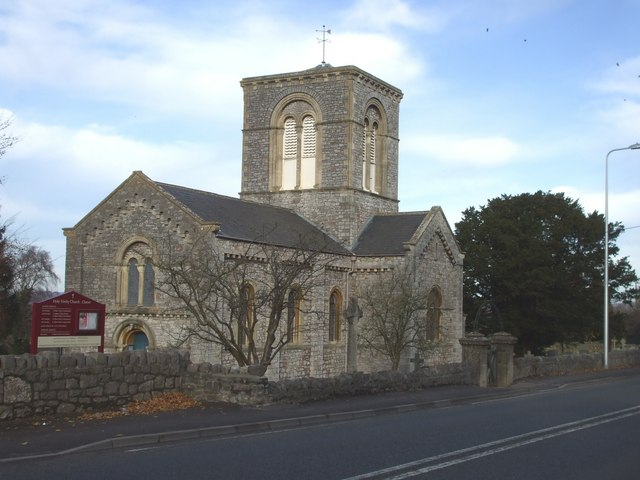

- Location within Somerset
- 51.3910°N 2.7774°W
- Location: Cleeve, Somerset, England

History
- Built: 1840

Listed Building – Grade II*
- Official name: Church Of Holy Trinity
- Designated: 20 January 1986
- Reference no.: 1129095

The Church Of Holy Trinity at Cleeve in the English county of Somerset was built in 1840. It is a Grade II* listed building.

== History ==
Cleeve, along with the village of Kenn, was previously part of the parish of Yatton. When the parish was divided public subscriptions were raised to build a separate church from local stone, with the Smyth Pigott family of Brockley Hall in nearby Brockley being the largest contributor. The foundation stone was laid in 1838 and the building consecrated in 1840. Cleeve became a separate parish of Cleeve with Claverham, in 1843.

The parish Church of Holy Trinity was built in a Neo-Norman style in 1840 by George Phillips Manners. In 1888 the church was restored and renovated, and in 1898 stained glass was added to the west windows.

The parish, within the Yatton Moor benefice, is part of the Diocese of Bath and Wells and in 2005 won an award as the first Ecocongregation in the Diocese. In 2010 an appeal was launched to raise money for the repair of the church tower.

== Architecture ==
It has a nave, north and south transepts, crossing tower and chancel. The nave has three bays with recessed bays to the north and south and a two-stage tower.

== See also ==
- List of ecclesiastical parishes in the Diocese of Bath and Wells
