= Blake's Pools =

Nature reserve in Somerset, England

Coordinates: 51.3937°N 2.9052°W

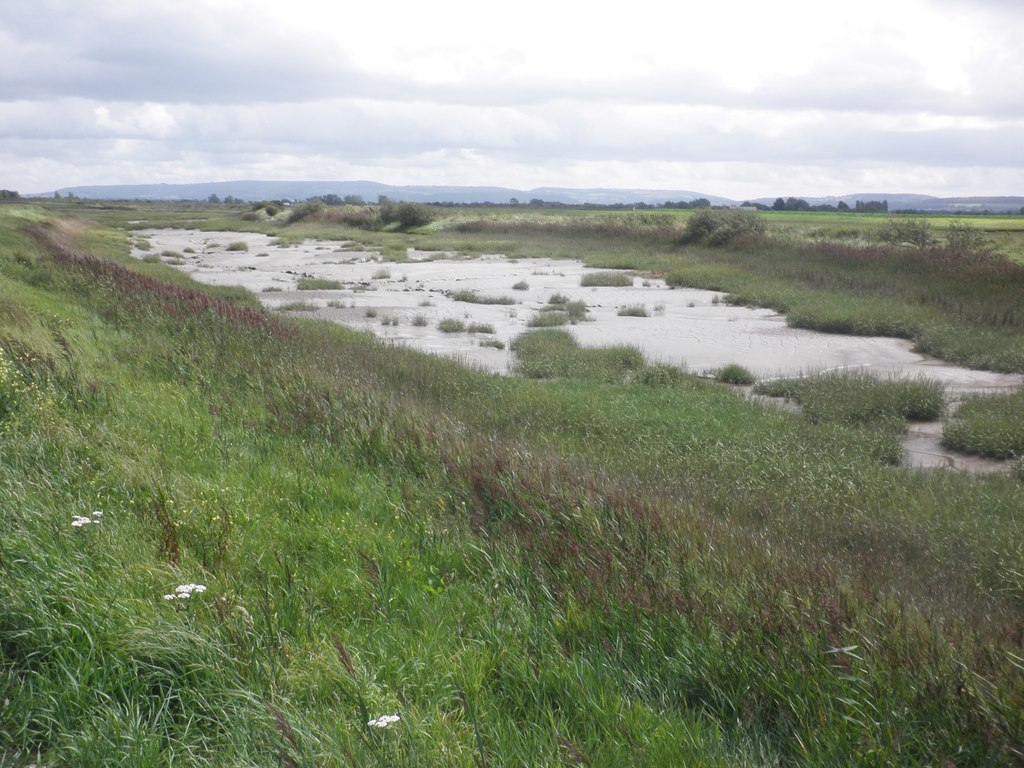
Blake's Pools

Blake's Pools are a 4 hectare nature reserve owned by Environment Agency and leased by the Avon Wildlife Trust, on the banks of the Congresbury Yeo close to its mouth, near Kingston Seymour, Somerset, in South West England.

The three freshwater and brackish pools were dug between 1983 and 1987 to attract wildlife. It forms part of the Severn Estuary Site of Special Scientific Interest, Special Protection Area and Ramsar site. In spring 2001 part of the sea wall protecting the outer pool collapsed, creating a tidal lagoon. To control water levels, sluice gates have been fitted into the two shallow pools. Reeds have also been planted around the largest pool.

Over 100 species of bird have visited the reserve, and shelduck, redshank and lapwing often nest. During periods of low tide the expansive areas of mud attract birds such as the little grebe and little egret. The two shallower pools attract wading birds, especially green and common sandpipers. In winter, and variety of wildfowl feed at the site including smew, scaup, black-necked grebe and dunlin.
