= Brockley Combe =

Wooded combe in North Somerset, England

Coordinates: 51°23′42″N 2°45′14″W

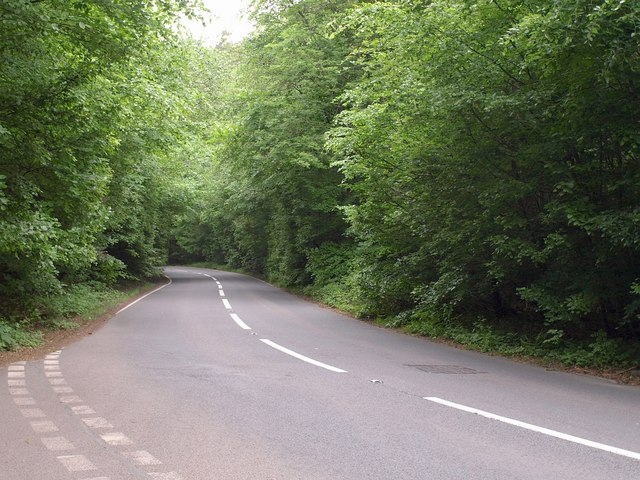
- Brockley Combe Road
- Interactive map of Brockley Combe

Brockley Combe is a wooded combe near the village of Brockley in North Somerset, England. The combe cuts into the western edge of the Lulsgate Plateau, the Carboniferous limestone hills which form a northern outlier of the Mendips, south west of Bristol.

Bristol International Airport lies at the top of the combe. A minor road runs along the length of the combe, meeting the A370 at the lower end, near the village of Brockley.

The name arises as a very rare co-joining of two Brythonic words; combe meaning 'a small deep dry valley, easily defended', and Brock meaning 'badger'. Combe is spelt differently in other part of the United Kingdom as Coombe and Coomb, but the meanings are the same.

The National Gazetteer of Great Britain and Ireland, published in 1868, describes Brockley Combe as follows: "Near the village, on the south-east, is Brockley Coomb, a deep narrow glen, of singular beauty, sunk between steep rocks, rising at some points to the height of 300 feet. It is adorned with many noble trees, and all the fissures and ledges of the cliffs are enriched with a great variety of mosses and other forms of vegetation. Lead ore is found here, and there are masses of columnar basalt."

Two identically named poems were written about the combe. Brockley Coomb by British Romantic poet Samuel Taylor Coleridge, which is subtitled Lines composed while climbing the left ascent of Brockley Coomb, May 1795; and Brockley Coomb by British poet Arthur Hugh Clough. John Marius Wilson said that Brockley Combe was a "favourite resort of Coleridge".

To the south is another, more undisturbed, combe, Goblin Combe.

== Brockley Hall ==
Forestry is carried out in the surrounding woodland. Down from the A370 is a Georgian manor house called Brockley Hall, this was inhabited by the Smyth Pigott family until later in its life. In World War II it was inhabited by American soldiers who have inscribed their names in the surrounding trees and even the large stone gate posts. After the war the hall was lived in by squatters. In the 1960s and early 70s, it was let out as flats, with houses being built in the grounds. Around 35 years ago, it was bought and refurbished, then resold as 4 separate apartments, each worth nowadays around £900,000

In the woods are the remains of a bowling green which was used in the late 18th and early 19th centuries. It is surrounded by large mature yew trees, one of which was painted by Samuel Hieronymus Grimm in 1773.
