= North Somerset Levels =

Coastal plain in Somerset, England

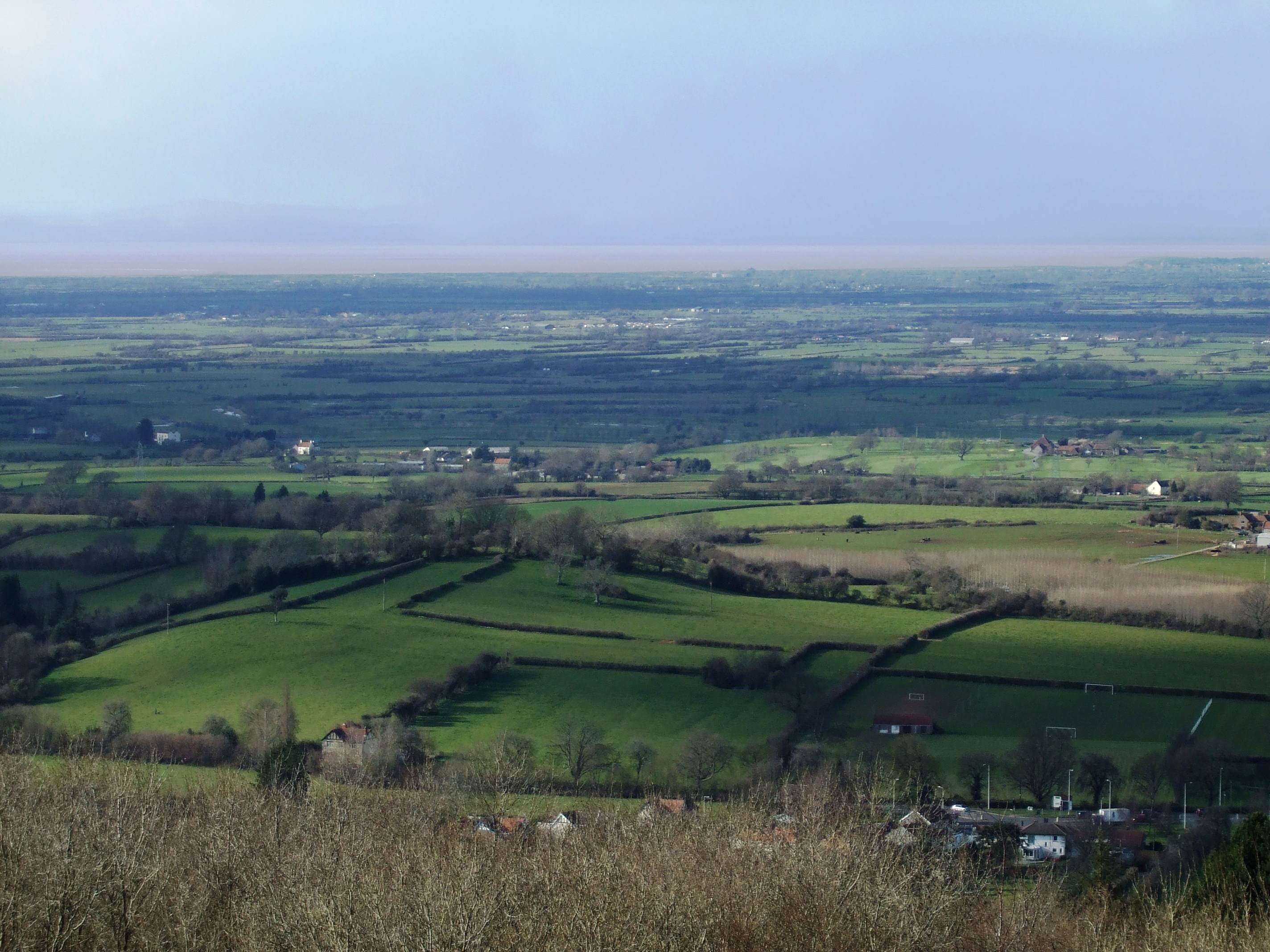
North Somerset Levels taken from Dolebury Warren

The North Somerset Levels is a coastal plain, an expanse of low-lying flat ground, which occupies an area between Weston-super-Mare and Bristol in North Somerset, England. The River Banwell, River Kenn, River Yeo and Land Yeo are the three principal rivers draining the area.

To the south the levels are bounded by the Mendip Hills, to the east by the Yeo Valley and the Lulsgate Plateau, and to the north by the Tickenham Ridge. To the west lies the Severn Estuary.

The levels are distinct from two similar areas: the much larger Somerset Levels to the south in Somerset, and the smaller Gordano Valley to the north.

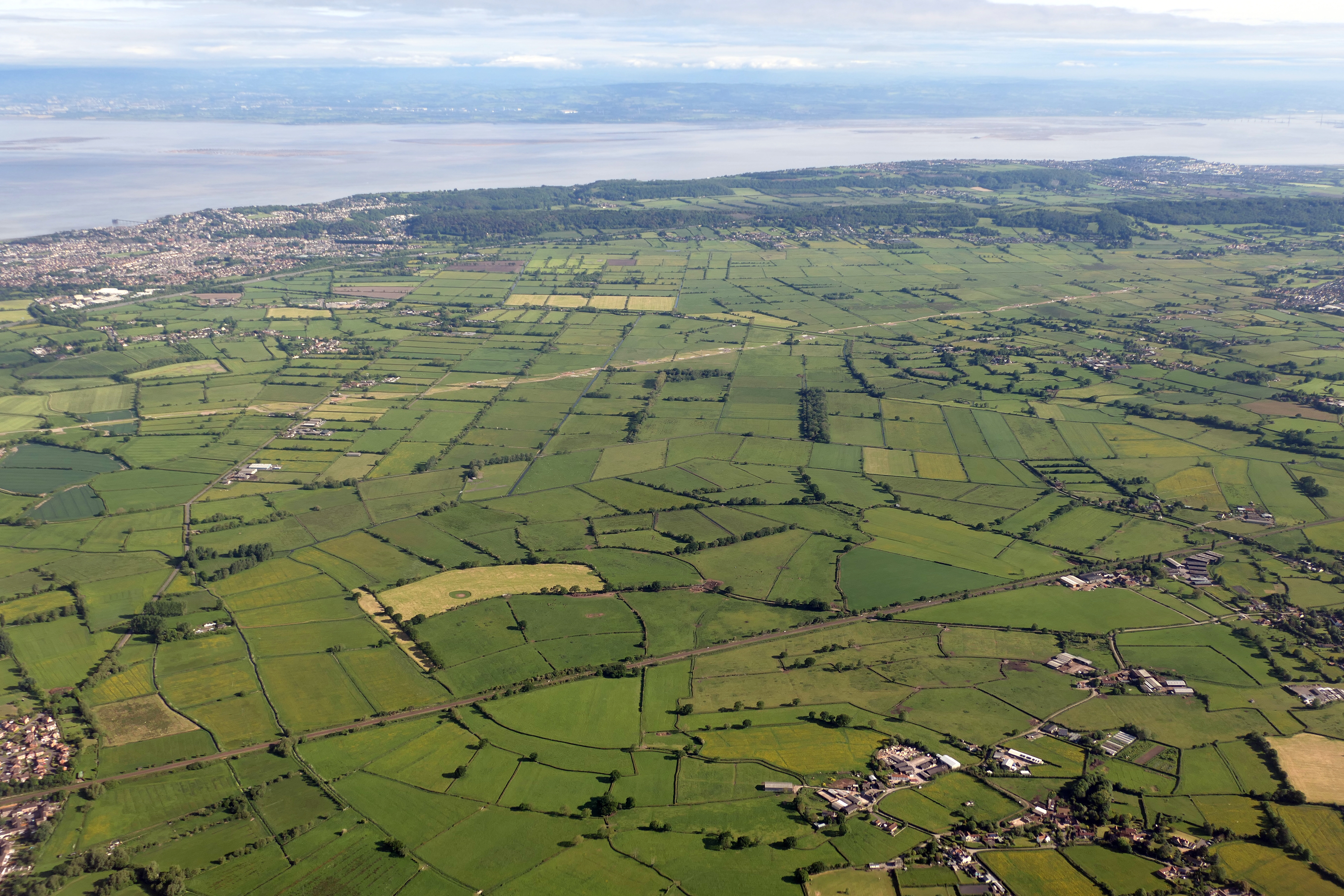
View of the most northerly part of the North Somerset Levels, including Kenn Moor, Nailsea Moor and Tickenham Moor.

The water level management and maintenance of rhynes in the area are the responsibility of the North Somerset Internal Drainage Board.

The term "Avon Levels" has also been used - either as a synonym for the North Somerset Levels, or to refer a larger area also including all of the other low-lying flat areas in the former county of Avon (e.g. the Gordano Valley and the areas around Severn Beach and Avonmouth).

== Towns and villages on the North Somerset Levels ==
The following are the principal towns and villages in the area

- Backwell
- Brinsea
- Chelvey
- Claverham
- Clevedon
- Congresbury
- Flax Bourton
- Hewish
- Kenn
- Kingston Seymour
- Locking
- Lower Langford
- Nailsea
- Puxton
- St. Georges
- Wick St Lawrence
- Worle
- Yatton

== Railway Stations ==
- Nailsea and Backwell railway station
- Yatton railway station
- Worle railway station

== Biodiversity ==
A number of areas of the Levels have been designated as Sites of Special Scientific Interest. Tickenham, Nailsea and Kenn Moors SSSI is an extensive SSSI in the northern part of the Levels. Yanal Bog, a calcicolous mire near Sandford is designated for its plant communities, within which grow black bog-rush (Schoenus nigricans) and blunt-flowered rush (Juncus subnodulosus), two plant species rare in southwest England.

A number of plant species which are otherwise scarce or absent in the Bristol region are found in high concentrations on the North Somerset Levels, including water horsetail (Equisetum fluviatile), rigid (Ceratophyllum demersum) and soft (C. submersum) hornworts, thread-leaved (Ranunculus trichophyllus), common (R. aquatilis) and fan-leaved (R. circinatus) water-crowfoots, lesser water-parsnip (Berula erecta), tubular (Oenanthe fistulosa) and fine-leaved (O. aquatica) water-dropworts, tufted forget-me-not (Myosotis laxa subsp. caespitosa), skullcap and fen bedstraw (Galium uliginosum). Water-violet (Hottonia palustris) is found here, mainly in the Nailsea & Tickenham areas, but also in scattered locations further south; this species is found nowhere else in the Bristol region. The introduced water fern Azolla filiculoides is widespread throughout.

Other plant species which are otherwise scarce or absent in the Bristol region but found in high concentrations on the North Somerset Levels are: flowering-rush (Myles, p. 210), lesser water-plantain (Myles, p.210-1), frogbit (Myles, p. 210-1), lesser pondweed (Myles, p.212-3), small pondweed (Myles, p. 212-3), hairlike pondweed (Myles, p213), opposite-leaved pondweed (Myles, p.213) and horned pondweed (Myles, p.213).

The introduced Canadian and Nuttall's waterweeds are widespread throughout the levels (Myles p.211).

== Bibliography ==
- Myles, Sarah (2000) The Flora of the Bristol Region ISBN 1-874357-18-8
