= Ubley =

Village in Somerset, England

Coordinates: 51.3209°N 2.6752°W

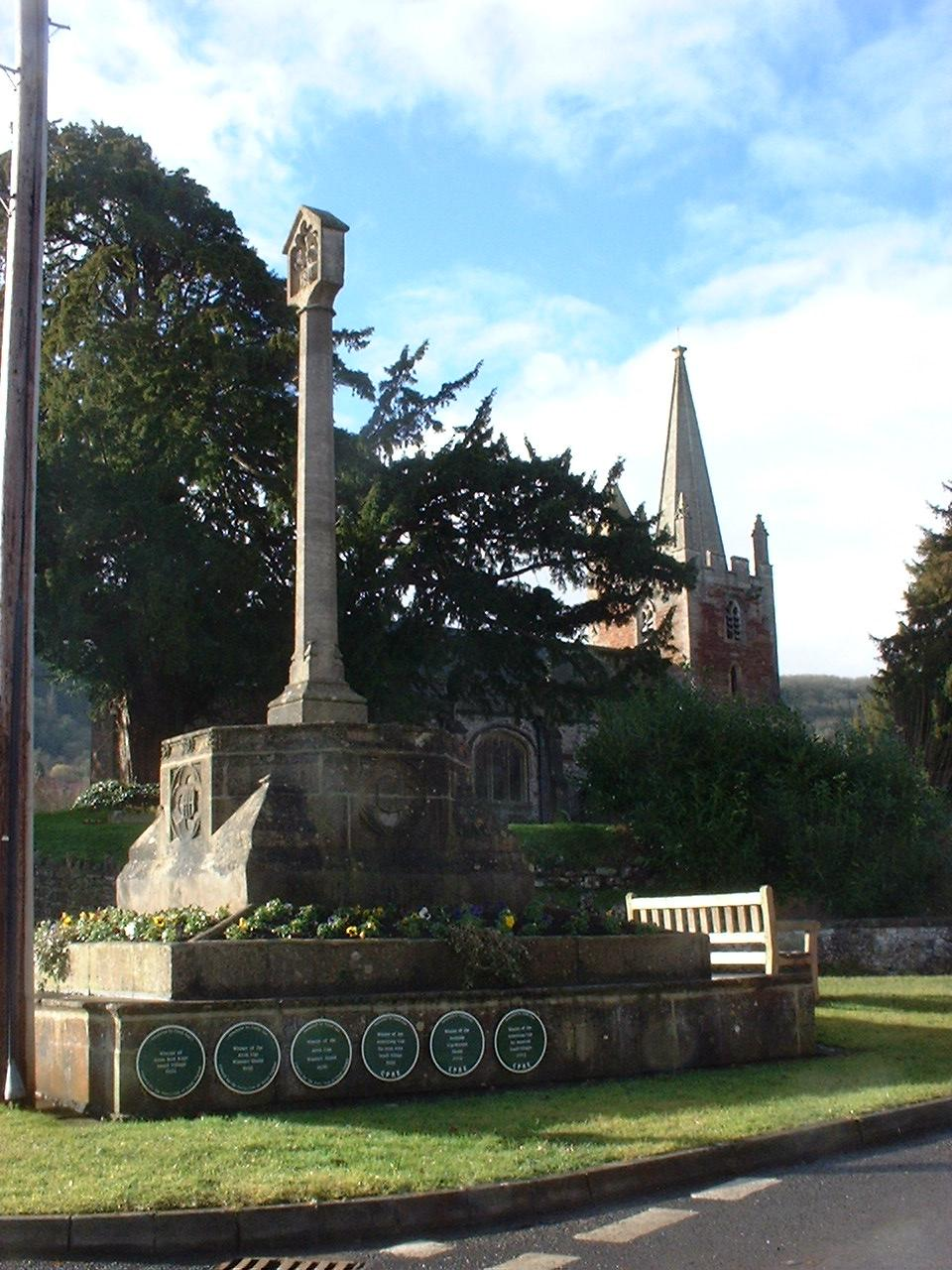
- Ubley Cross and church tower

- Location within Somerset
- Population: 331 (2011)
- OS grid reference: ST529582
- Unitary authority: Bath and North East Somerset
- Ceremonial county: Somerset
- Region: South West
- Country: England
- Sovereign state: United Kingdom
- Post town: BRISTOL
- Postcode district: BS40
- Dialling code: 01761
- Police: Avon and Somerset
- Fire: Avon
- Ambulance: South Western
- UK Parliament: North East Somerset and Hanham

Ubley is a small village and civil parish within the Chew Valley in Bath and North East Somerset about 9 miles (14.5 km) south of Bristol. It is just south-east of Blagdon Lake, just off the A368 between Compton Martin and Blagdon.

== History ==
There are a number of Bronze Age round barrows on or close to the lip of Mendip's northern scarp above Ubley, but contra earlier edits of this page, no Neolithic long barrows are yet known on the high ground to the south of the village.

In a charter of King Edgar, between 959 and 975 the name of the village was recorded as Hubbanlege. The text of the charter itself does not survive; all we know of it is from its appearance in an index list of purported grants to Glastonbury Abbey compiled probably in the mid-13th century. The charter is S1771 in Peter Sawyer's standard handlist of Anglo-Saxon charters up to 1066.

Ubley was listed in the Domesday Book of 1086 as Tumbeli, which is clearly a garbled expression of the (probably) original Old English toponym. It seems fairly certain that the second element is Old English lēah, 'a woodland clearing', but with an important secondary, or even sometimes alternative meaning of 'wood pasture', which seems to have been a development from the primary meaning. The meaning of the first element is entirely unknown, but seems most likely to represent a personal name, perhaps Ubba. There is no evidence whatsoever, of any kind whether archaeological or historical, for the frequent but completely unfounded story that Ubley is the VEB which is found cast into a number of pigs of lead from the Roman lead workings at Charterhouse on Mendip. There is no authoritative agreement on what these letters actually signify although the late Professor Todd was of the view that it probably is a place-name and is most likely to refer to the mining settlement at Charterhouse itself, although this question is now probably far beyond firm proof. Prof Todd has also produced a very useful list of Roman lead pigs identified from the Mendip mines up to the date of his publication.

The parish was part of the hundred of Chewton.

Mining for ochre and manganese took place during the 19th century.

== Governance ==
The parish council has responsibility for local issues, including setting an annual precept (local rate) to cover the council's operating costs and producing annual accounts for public scrutiny. The parish council evaluates local planning applications and works with the local police, district council officers, and neighbourhood watch groups on matters of crime, security, and traffic. The parish council's role also includes initiating projects for the maintenance and repair of parish facilities, such as the village hall or community centre, playing fields and playgrounds, as well as consulting with the district council on the maintenance, repair, and improvement of highways, drainage, footpaths, public transport, and street cleaning. Conservation matters (including trees and listed buildings) and environmental issues are also of interest to the council.

Ubley is part of the Chew Valley South Ward, which is represented by one councillor on the unitary authority of Bath and North East Somerset which was created in 1996, as established by the Local Government Act 1992. It provides a single tier of local government with responsibility for almost all local government functions within its area including local planning and building control, local roads, council housing, environmental health, markets and fairs, refuse collection, recycling, cemeteries, crematoria, leisure services, parks, and tourism. It is also responsible for education, social services, libraries, main roads, public transport, Trading Standards, waste disposal and strategic planning, although fire, police and ambulance services are provided jointly with other authorities through the Avon Fire and Rescue Service, Avon and Somerset Constabulary and the Great Western Ambulance Service.

Bath and North East Somerset's area covers part of the ceremonial county of Somerset but it is administered independently of the non-metropolitan county. Its administrative headquarters is in Bath. Between 1 April 1974 and 1 April 1996, it was the Wansdyke district and the City of Bath of the county of Avon. Before 1974 that the parish was part of the Clutton Rural District.

The parish is represented in the House of Commons of the Parliament of the United Kingdom as part of North East Somerset and Hanham. It elects one Member of Parliament (MP) by the first past the post system of election.

== Geography ==
The village lies under the northern slopes of the Mendip Hills within the Chew Valley about 8 miles south of Bristol and 10 miles from Bath. It is just south-east of Blagdon Lake and between Blagdon Lake and Chew Valley Lake.

== Demography ==
According to the 2001 Census, the Chew Valley South Ward (which includes Nempnett Thrubwell) had 1,032 residents, living in 411 households, with an average age of 42.1 years. Of these, 74% of residents described their health as 'good', 20% of 16- to 74-year-olds had no qualifications; and the area had an unemployment rate of 1.7% of all economically active people aged 16–74. In the Index of Multiple Deprivation 2004, it was ranked at 22,950 out of 32,482 wards in England, where 1 was the most deprived LSOA and 32,482 the least deprived.

== Landmarks ==
=== War memorial ===
The village war memorial is 2.5 metres high and has a three-stepped base. It commemorates the five people from the village who died in World War I.

=== Village hall ===
The modern village hall is the venue for Blagdon Rainbow Guides and Brownies on a Monday during term time as well as the monthly Ubley Publey and annual Chew Valley Beer Festival.

=== Grade II listed buildings ===
- Historic England. "Mendip View (1320718)". National Heritage List for England.
- Historic England. "Methodist Church (1129653)". National Heritage List for England.
- Historic England. "The Manor House (1320717)". National Heritage List for England.
- Historic England. "K6 Telephone Kiosk (1129655)". National Heritage List for England.

== Transport ==
Ubley lies on the A368 between Compton Martin and Blagdon, although the village centre is north of the main road and served only by minor roads.

== Education ==
In the village is a primary school

== Religious sites ==
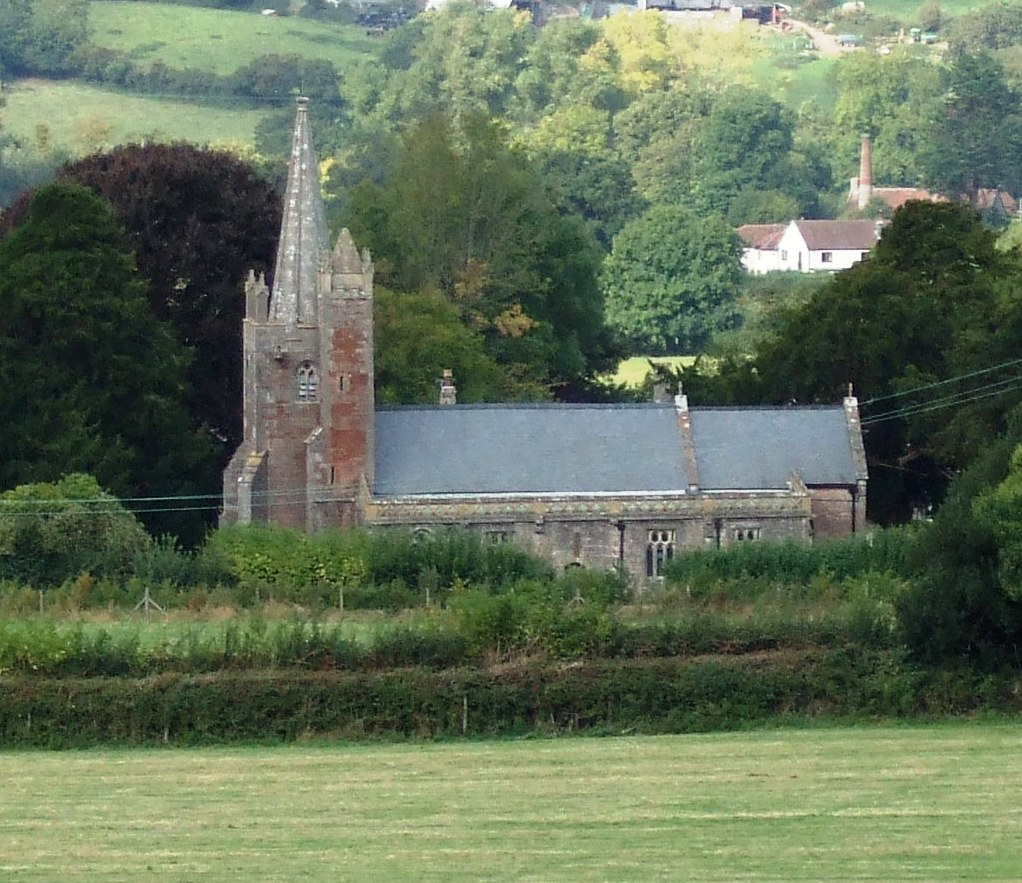
Ubley church

The village has a small medieval church, the Church of St Bartholomew, in its present form originating from the 13th century with later additions. However, the site itself is almost certainly far older, and there is every possibility that there would have been a church extant, although perhaps of timber, well before the Norman Conquest. This suggestion is reinforced by the survival of a Norman font, evidence that there was previously a church of at least that date on the site. The church has no fixed pews. Features include a Jacobean pulpit and a chained copy of the 'Paraphrases of Erasmus' dated 1552. The church is a Grade I listed building
