= Congresbury Yeo =

River in North Somerset, England

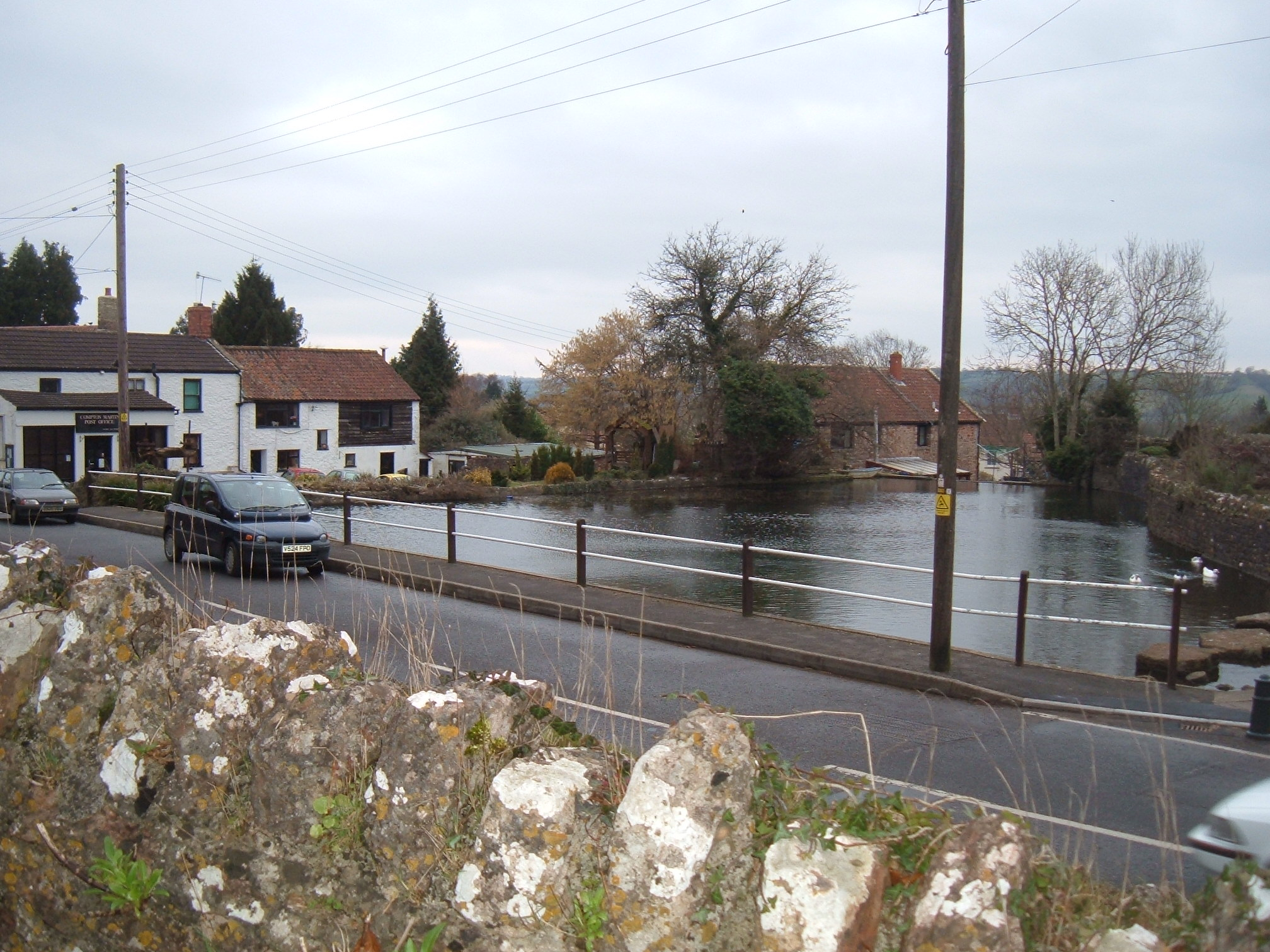
- Compton Martin Duck Pond

Location
- Country: England
- County: Somerset
- Cities: Ubley, Congresbury, Wrington, Iwood

Physical characteristics
- Source: Compton Martin Duck Pond
  - location: Compton Martin, Somerset, England
  - coordinates: 51°18′38″N 2°39′12″W
- Mouth: Severn Estuary
  - location: Kingston Seymour, Somerset, England
  - coordinates: 51°23′43″N 2°54′39″W
  - elevation: 0 ft (0 m)

The River Yeo (often referred to as the Congresbury Yeo, after the village of Congresbury, through which it flows, to avoid confusion with other similarly named rivers) is a river which flows through North Somerset, England.

== River course ==
The river rises in the centre of Compton Martin village, in the district of Bath and North East Somerset, as a spring which feeds the village duckpond. From there it flows past the village of Ubley and enters Blagdon Lake (created in the 1890s by damming the river) just north of the village of Blagdon. From the lake the river flows south of Wrington and Iwood, where there were once a series of watermills along its banks. Its route then takes it around the northern outskirts of Congresbury, and across the North Somerset Levels roughly parallel to the A370 road, past the site of a Roman villa before crossing under the M5 motorway and emptying into the Severn Estuary in Woodspring Bay, downstream from Clevedon and west of the village of Kingston Seymour.

Close to the mouth on the Severn Estuary on land owned by Environment Agency and leased by the Avon Wildlife Trust are Blake's Pools which were dug between 1983 and 1987 to attract wildlife. It forms part of the Severn Estuary Site of Special Scientific Interest, Special Protection Area and Ramsar site.

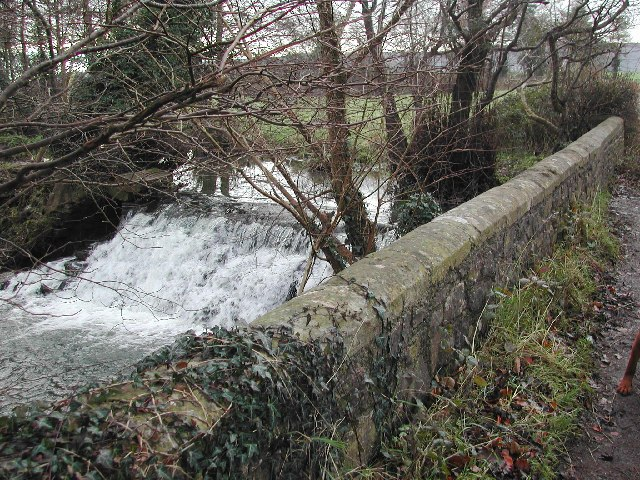
Waterfall on the Yeo, south west of Wrington

== Flood prevention and conservation ==
The river falls within the area of the West Mendip Internal Drainage Board, which has a range of policies and guidance about flood prevention and conservation in the area. Levees or high embankments have been erected where the river runs parallel to the A370 and the river is regularly dredged.

== See also ==
- Wrington Vale Light Railway
- Yeo Valley Organic
