= Kingston Seymour =

Village in Somerset, England

Coordinates: 51.398°N 2.861°W

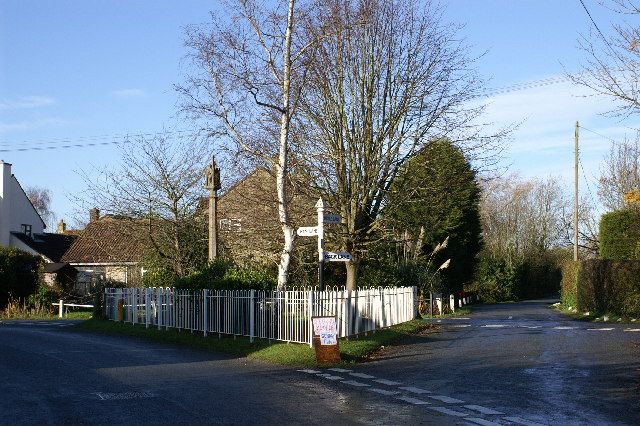
- The Triangle

- Location within Somerset
- Population: 388 (2011)
- OS grid reference: ST402670
- Unitary authority: North Somerset
- Ceremonial county: Somerset
- Region: South West
- Country: England
- Sovereign state: United Kingdom
- Post town: CLEVEDON
- Postcode district: BS21
- Dialling code: 01934
- Police: Avon and Somerset
- Fire: Avon
- Ambulance: South Western
- UK Parliament: Wells and Mendip Hills

Kingston Seymour is a small village and civil parish with royal status in Somerset, England. It is situated within the unitary authority of North Somerset, between Clevedon and Weston-super-Mare on the North Somerset Levels. The parish has a population of 388.

== History ==
The late medieval village cross stands on "The Triangle".

The parish was part of the hundred of Chewton.

The village suffered serious flooding in the Bristol Channel floods of 1607 when the sea walls were breached and the church in Kingston Seymour was said to have 5 feet (2 m) of water in it for ten days. The parish, which extends to the Severn Estuary coast, saw flooding on a regular basis as late as the 1800s. After flooding, the land was considered unsuitable for dairy cattle for some time and the resulting bad air was said to cause "attacks of the ague" in local people.

Kingston Seymour school opened its doors in 1858. Closing in 1968, the building was then used as an office for the local drainage board and later as a spinning and weaving centre. It has now been converted into a private house.

The village used to be on the route of the Clevedon branch line a 3.5 miles (5.6 km) railway line that ran from Yatton railway station to Clevedon. It was opened in 1847 and passenger services ceased in 1966. The last original bits of track, around Kingston Bridge, were lifted in the late 1980s.

A motorway service area for the adjacent M5 motorway was planned to be built near the village, although there is no evidence on the ground of this. Land was purchased by the department for the Environment but plans were shelved in the 1990s, with the Department for Transport announced that the existing service areas would be suitable and that there was no need to develop another one at Kingston Seymour. The land was still owned by the Highways Agency as recently as 2006.

== Governance ==
The parish council has responsibility for local issues, including setting an annual precept (local rate) to cover the council's operating costs and producing annual accounts for public scrutiny. The parish council evaluates local planning applications and works with the local police, district council officers, and neighbourhood watch groups on matters of crime, security, and traffic. The parish council's role also includes initiating projects for the maintenance and repair of parish facilities, such as the village hall or community centre, playing fields and playgrounds, as well as consulting with the district council on the maintenance, repair, and improvement of highways, drainage, footpaths, public transport, and street cleaning. Conservation matters (including trees and listed buildings) and environmental issues are also of interest to the council.

The parish falls within the unitary authority of North Somerset which was created in 1996, as established by the Local Government Act 1992. It provides a single tier of local government with responsibility for almost all local government functions within its area including local planning and building control, local roads, council housing, environmental health, markets and fairs, refuse collection, recycling, cemeteries, crematoria, leisure services, parks, and tourism. It is also responsible for education, social services, libraries, main roads, public transport, trading standards, waste disposal and strategic planning, although fire, police and ambulance services are provided jointly with other authorities through the Avon Fire and Rescue Service, Avon and Somerset Constabulary and the South Western Ambulance Service.

North Somerset's area covers part of the ceremonial county of Somerset but it is administered independently of the non-metropolitan county. Its administrative headquarters is in the town hall in Weston-super-Mare. Between 1 April 1974 and 1 April 1996, it was the Woodspring district of the county of Avon. Before 1974 that the parish was part of the Long Ashton Rural District.

The parish is represented in the House of Commons of the Parliament of the United Kingdom as part of the Wells and Mendip Hills constituency. It elects one Member of Parliament (MP) by the first past the post system of election.

== Geography ==
The village is close to Blake's Pools, a nature reserve owned by Environment Agency and leased by the Avon Wildlife Trust, on the banks of the Congresbury Yeo close to its mouth. The three freshwater and brackish pools were dug between 1983 and 1987 to attract wildlife. It forms part of the Severn Estuary Site of Special Scientific Interest, Special Protection Area and Ramsar site.

== Religious sites ==
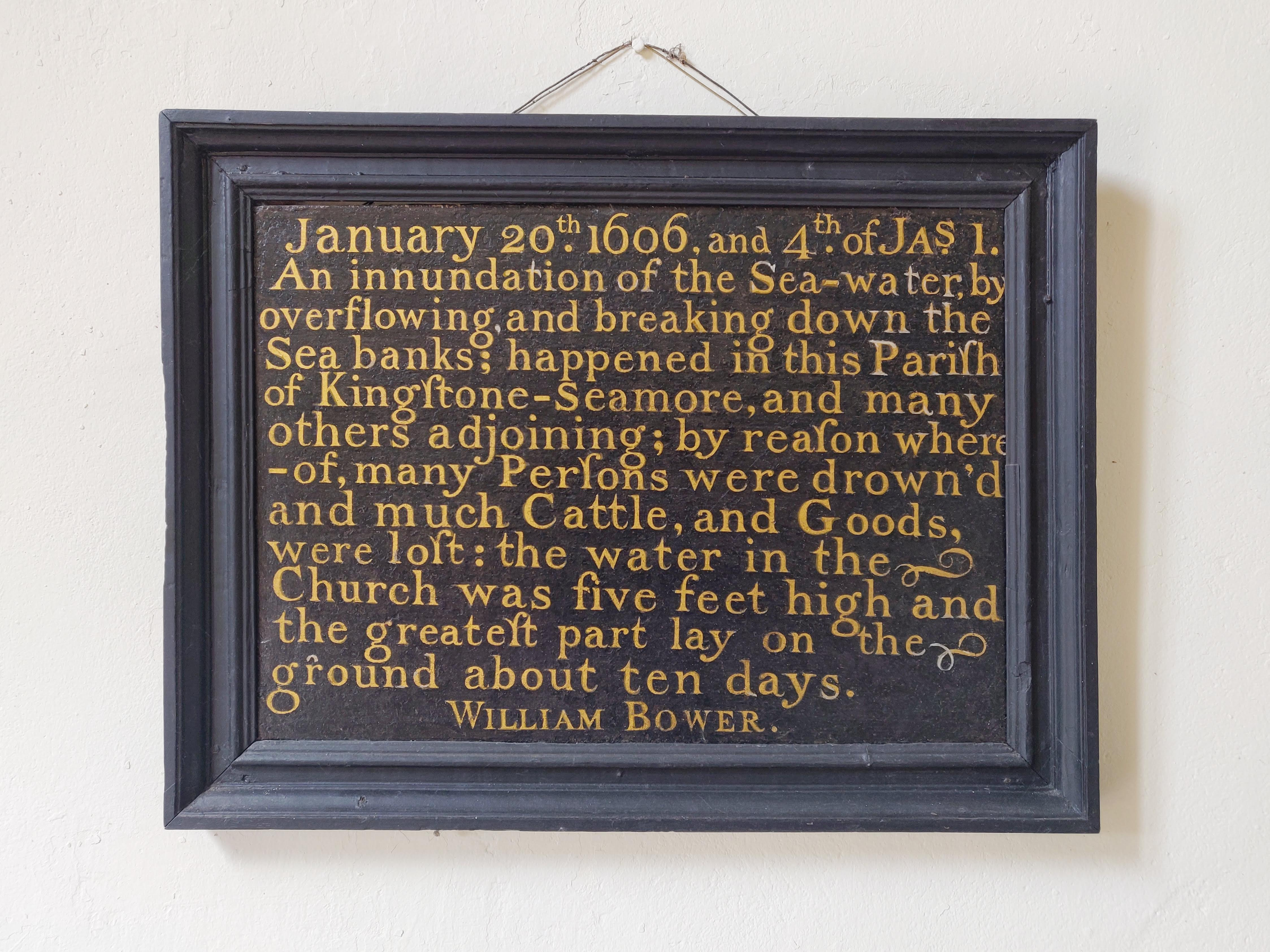
Plaque, in All Saints Church, recording the flood of 1606–07

The Anglican parish Church of All Saints dates from the late 14th or early 15th century and is in the Perpendicular Gothic style. It has been designated as a Grade I listed building. The porch contains a plaque which describes the Bristol Channel floods which affected this area of coastal Somerset in 1607. During that event the floodwaters rose over the top of the church's pews and filled the font. The plaque records the date as occurring in 1606 using the old style dating system in use at the time however the flood occurred during 1607 on the current (new style) dating system.
