= Goblin Combe =

Valley in Somerset, England

- Site of Special Scientific Interest
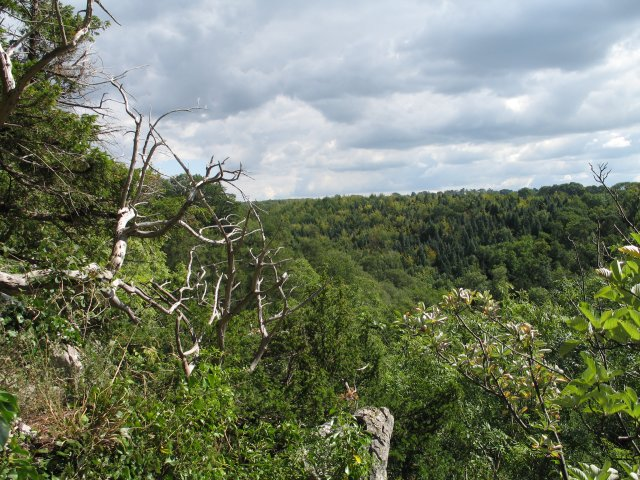

- Location within Somerset
- Location of Goblin Combe.
- Area of search: North Somerset
- Grid reference: ST473652
- Coordinates: 51.383°N 2.759°W
- Interest: Biological
- Area: 51.87 hectares (0.5187 km^{2}; 0.2003 sq mi)
- Notification date: 1999

Goblin Combe is a dry valley in North Somerset which stretches for approximately 3½ km from Redhill, near Bristol International Airport on the A38, through to Cleeve on the A370. The combe is located at (grid reference ST473652), and is a 52-hectare (128-acre) biological Site of Special Scientific Interest (SSSI) originally notified in 1999, with 9 hectares (22 acres) being managed as a nature reserve by the Avon Wildlife Trust. The Combe runs along the southern edge of a large woodland. "Combe" is the same as the Welsh word "cwm" which means valley.

Above the valley is Cleeve Toot an Iron Age hillfort. It is a roughly oval settlement which is approximately 125 metres (410 ft) in length by 90 metres (300 ft) in breadth. Approximately 150 metres (490 ft) to the north is another, smaller settlement. They are thought to have been a satellite community of nearby Cadbury Hill Pits have been found at the site indicating the presence of round houses. There is a single stone rampart with a broad shallow outer ditch. There is also a prehistoric or Roman field system.

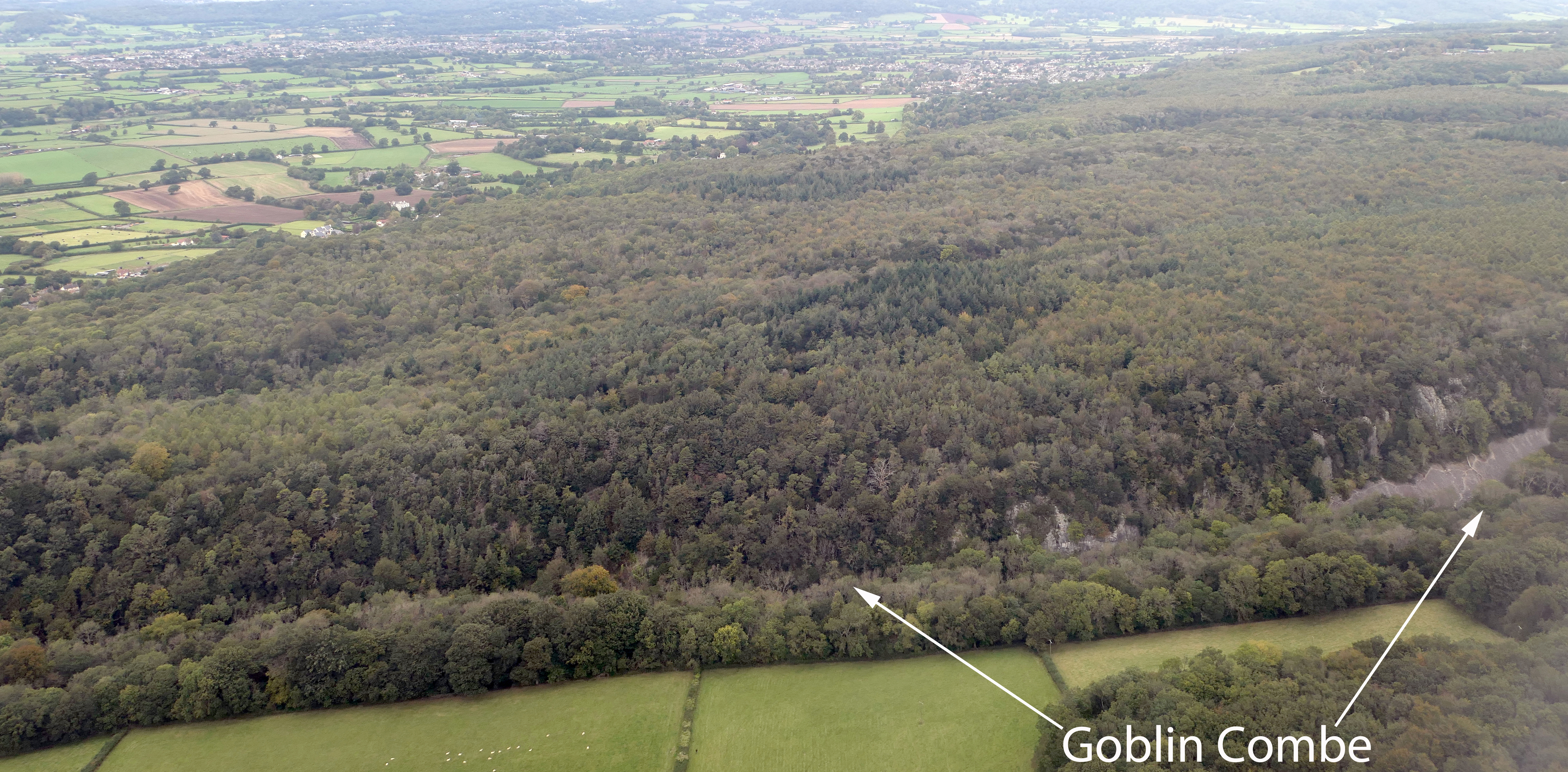
Aerial view of part of Goblin Combe near Cleeve.

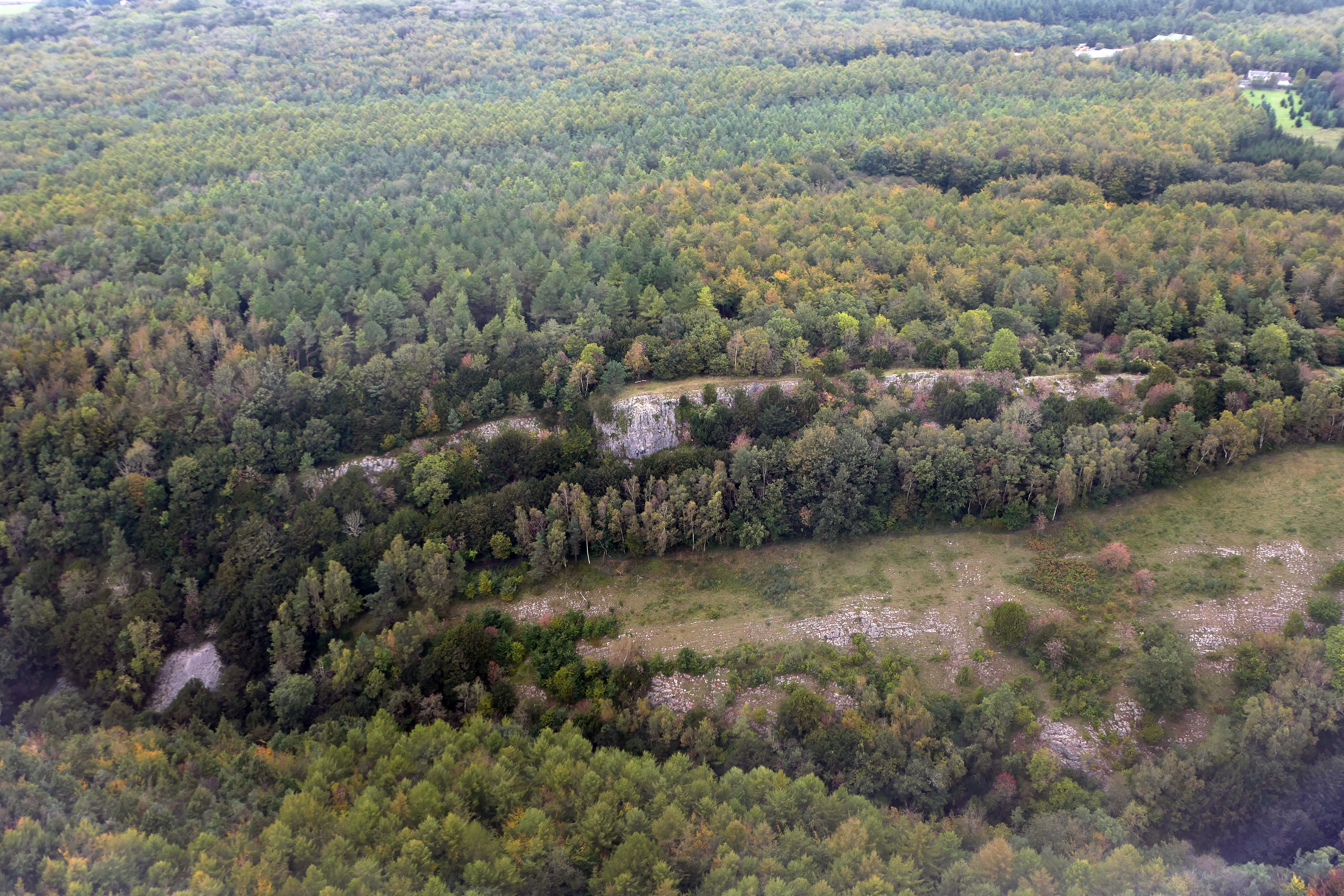
Part of the Goblin Combe Avon Wildlife Trust nature reserve.

== Folk tale ==
Goblin Combe has a folk tale involving primroses:

“There was a parcel of children and they was a-picking primroses, see, and one poor little dear her wandered away on her lone self right down into Goblin Combe. She were only a little trot, see, and didn't know no better. Well, when she do find she's a lost she cries, and the tears do run down her dear little face, and dap on her pinafore like summer rain, and she do throw her self against a rock. Then the rock opens and there's the fairies all come to comfort her tears. They do give her a gold ball and they lead the dear little soul safe home – on account she was carrying primroses, see. Well, twas the wonder of the village and the conjuror he gets the notion he'd aget his fists on more than one gold ball when next the fairies opened the hill. So he do pick a bunch of primroses and he go on up Goblin Combe, and he was glad enough to get in to the rock after all he see and hear on the way up. Well, twasn't the right day, nor the right number of primroses, and he wasn't no dear little soul – so they took him!“

== Flora and fauna ==
A population of the nationally scarce plant stinking hellebore (Helleborus foetidus) grows on scree slopes in the combe, near Cleeve Toot; it is native at this site. Limestone fern (Gymnocarpum robertianum), another nationally scarce plant, is also found here on limestone scree. Other flowers include the autumn gentian, autumn ladies'-tresses and yellow-wort. The site also supports a varied collection of butterflies, with over 30 species recorded. These include grizzled and dingy skippers, brown argus and green hairstreak.

== Goblin Combe Environment Centre ==
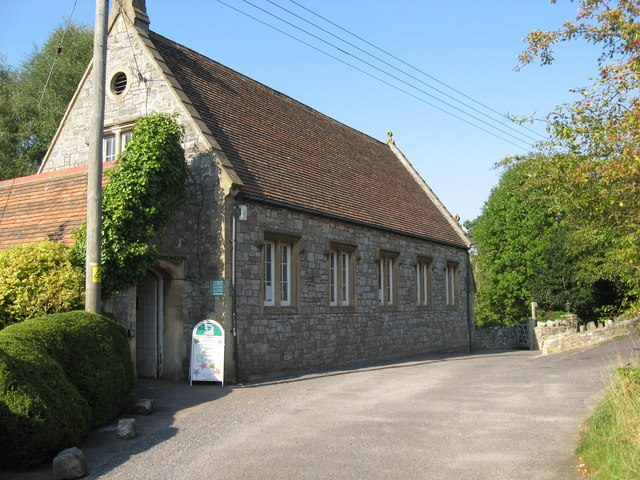
Goblin Combe Environment Centre

Goblin Combe Environment Centre is a registered charity (No 1099543) which provides educational training and residential facilities for visiting groups. It is located within a large expanse of woodland ridges at the start of Goblin Combe. The centre's aim is to provide a wide range of environmental education to all ages and all sectors of the community. It uses the woods to provide a teaching space in a 'classroom without walls', and a dynamic learning environment for natural history.

== Sources ==
- English Nature citation sheet for the site (accessed on 16 July 2006)
