= Church porch =

Architectural feature

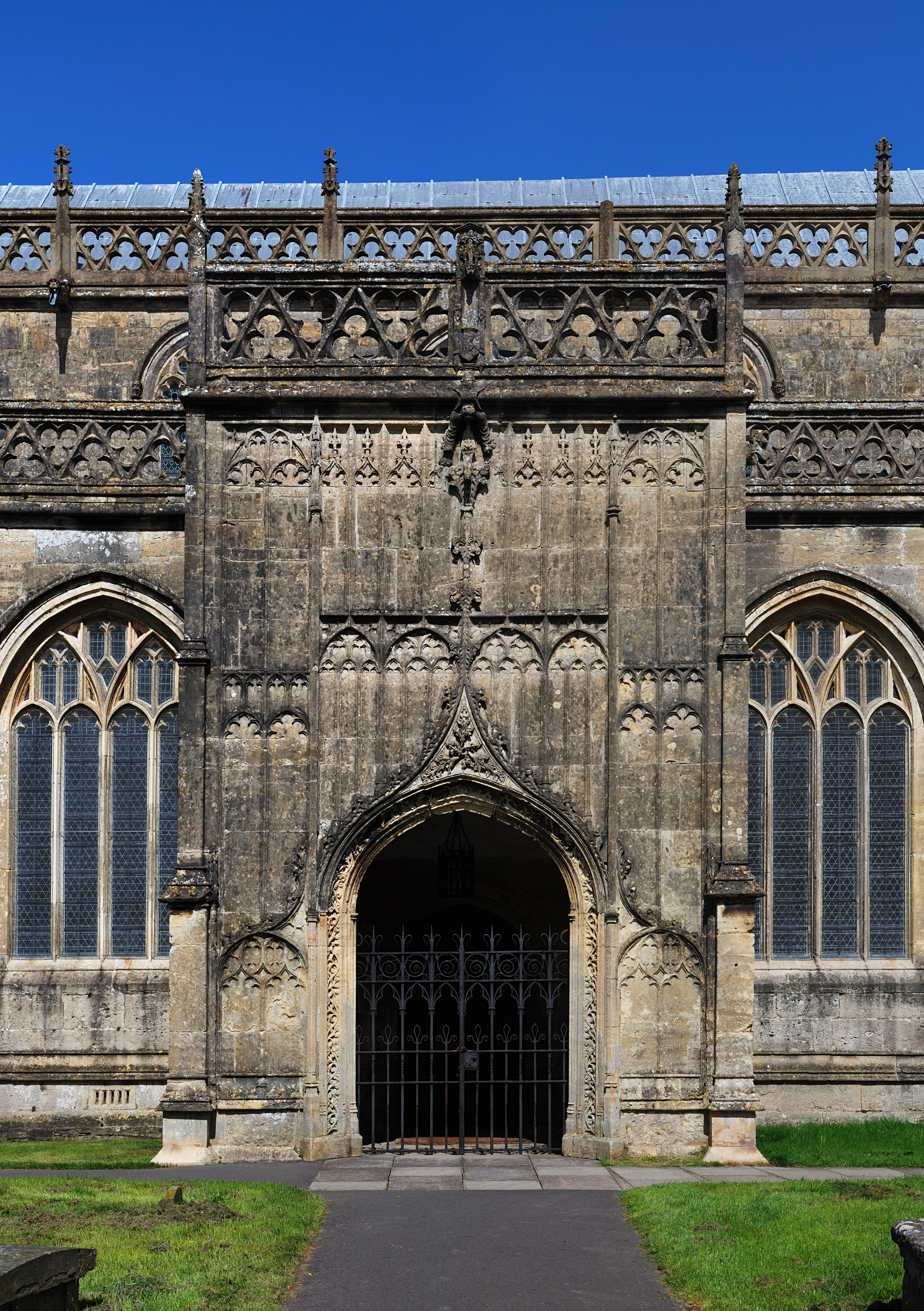
The highly decorated two-storey porch of St Mary's, Yatton, England

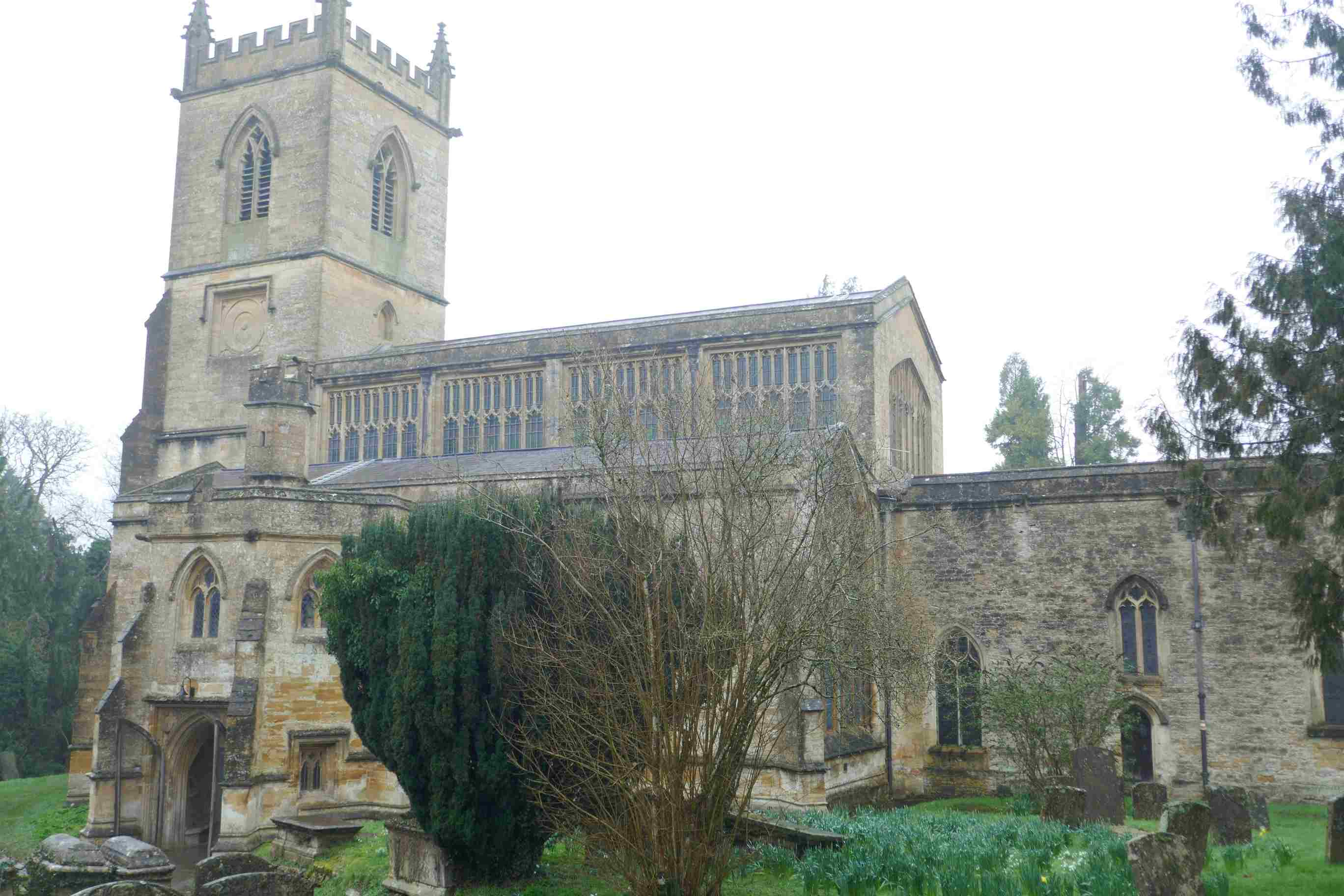
The Church of St Mary's Chipping Norton with its unusual octagonal porch and Parvise

A church porch is a room-like structure at a church's main entrance. A porch protects from the weather to some extent. Some porches have an outer door, others a simple gate, and in some cases the outer opening is not closed in any way.

The porch at St Wulfram's Church, Grantham, like many others of the period, has a room above the porch. It once provided lodging for the priest, but now houses the Francis Trigge Chained Library. Such a room is sometimes called a parvise which spelt as parvis normally means an open space or colonnade in front of a church entrance.

In Scandinavia and Germany the porch of a church is often called by names meaning weaponhouse. It used to be believed that visitors stored their weapons there because of a prohibition against carrying weapons into the sanctuary, or into houses in general; this is now considered apocryphal by most accepted sources, and the weaponhouse is considered more likely to have functioned as a guardroom or armoury to store weapons in case of need.

== Examples ==
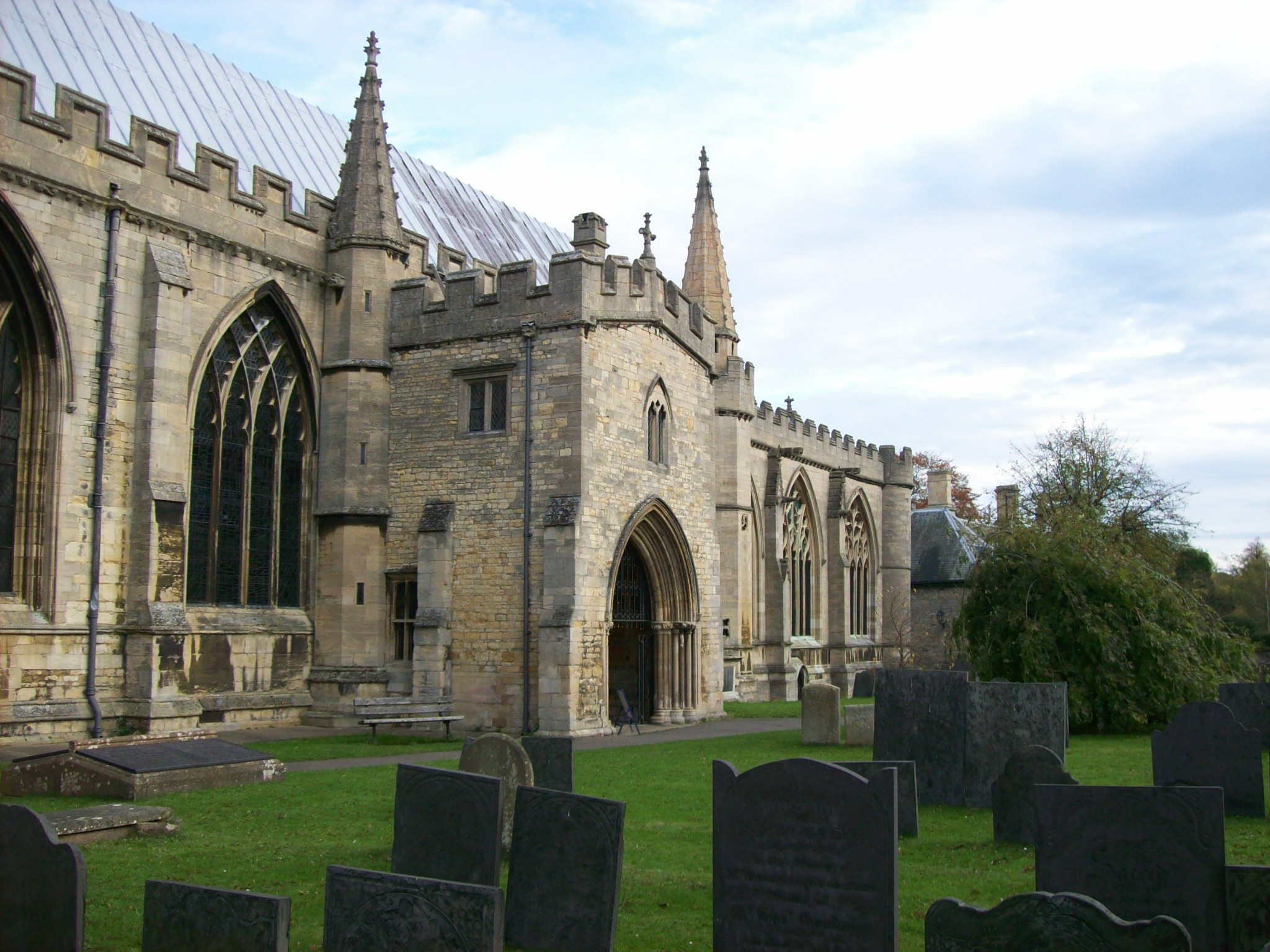
St Wulfram's Grantham, England: The church porch which houses the chained library

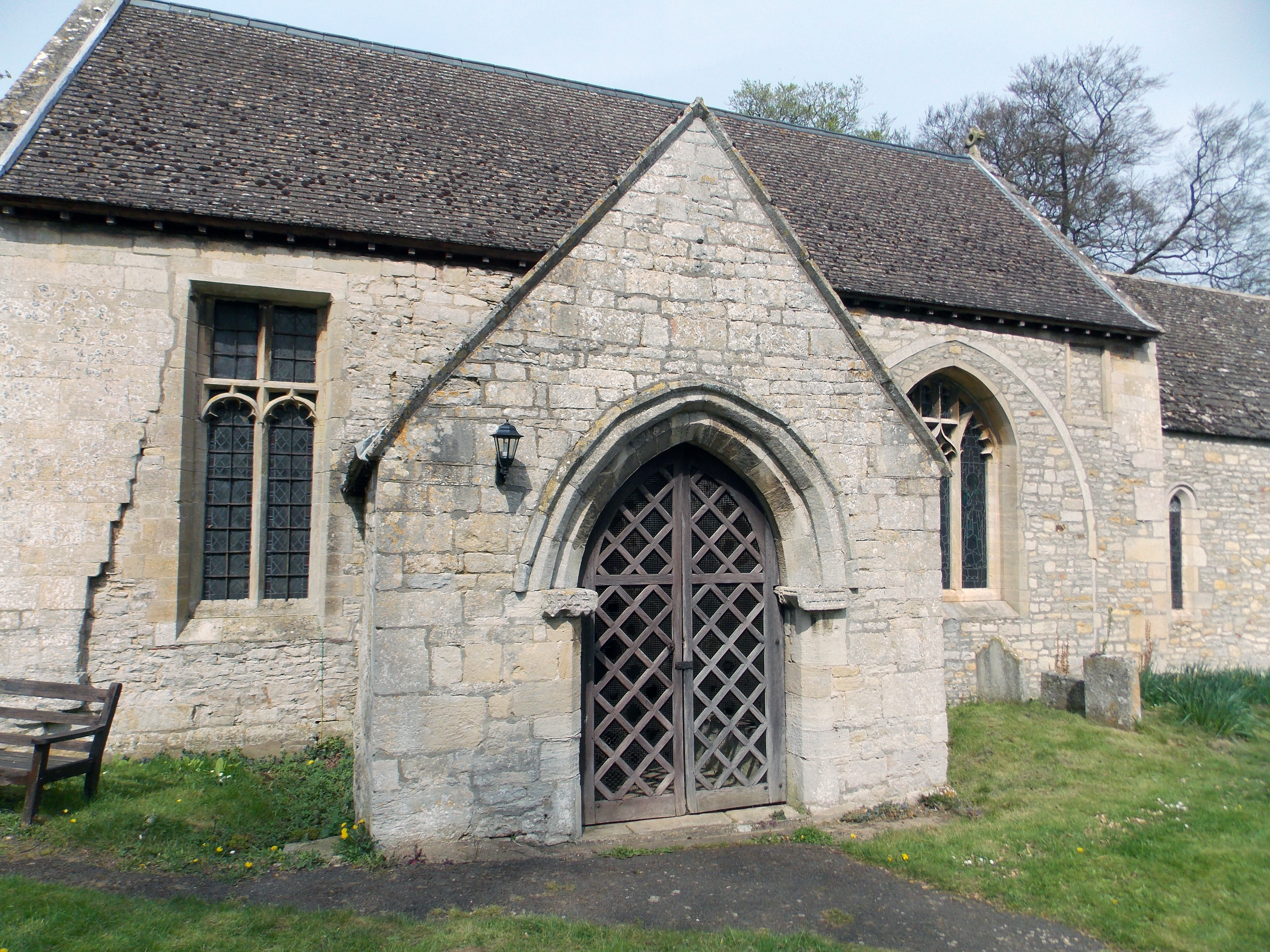
Church Porch with lattice gate, intended mainly to prevent birds nesting in the porch. St Guthlac, Little Ponton (England)

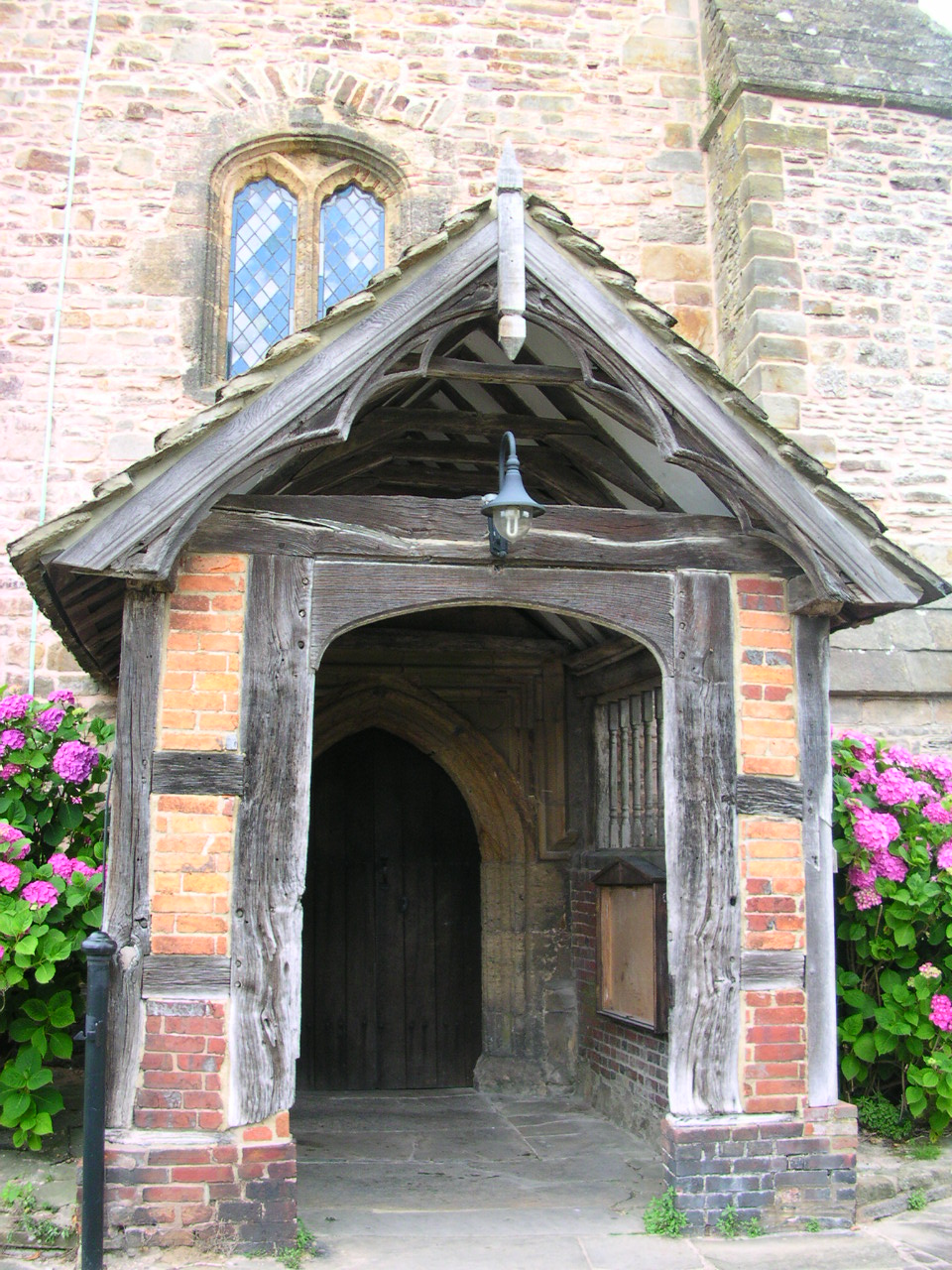
Billingshurst Church, England

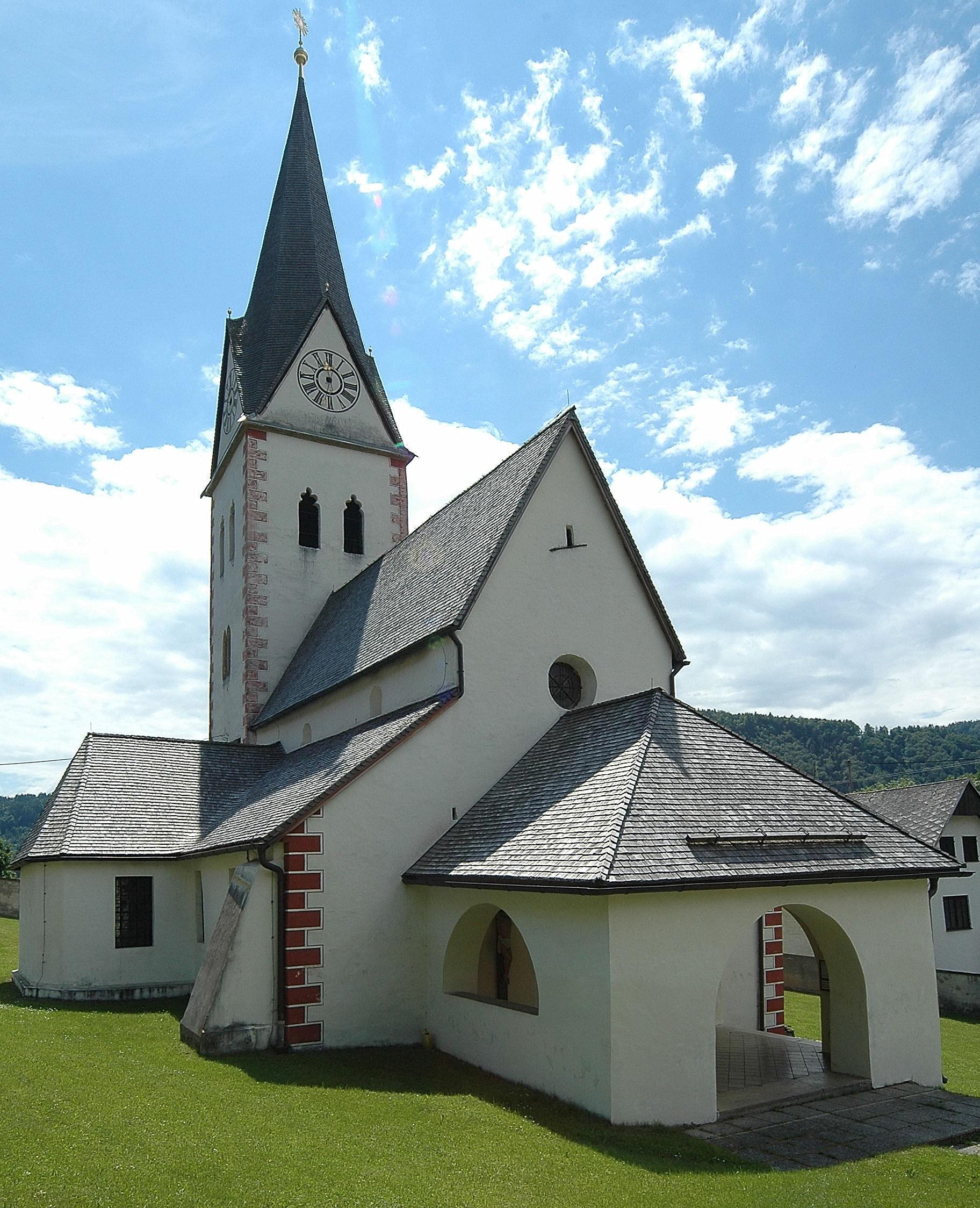
Keutschach am See Church, Austria

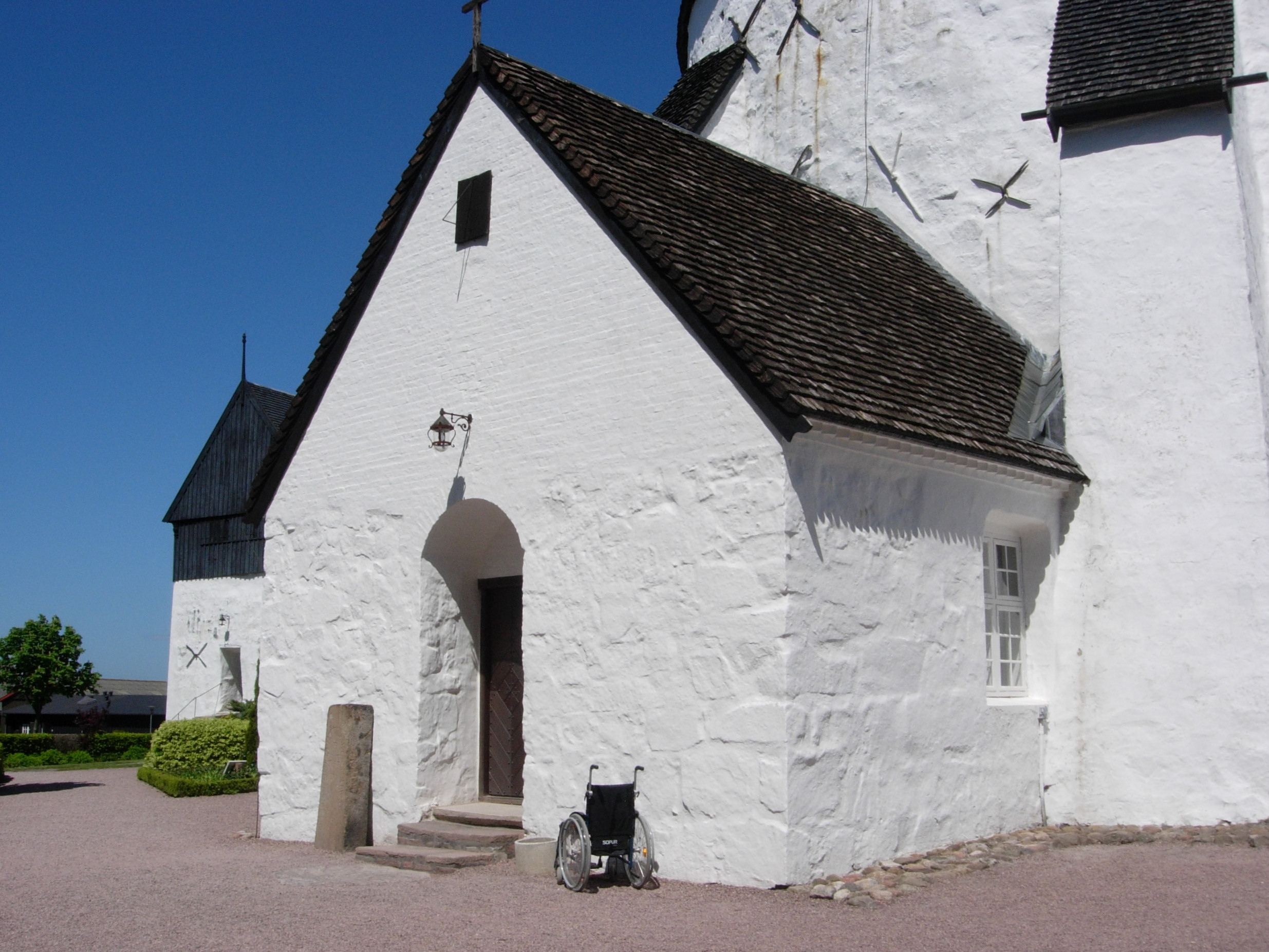
Østerlars Church, Denmark

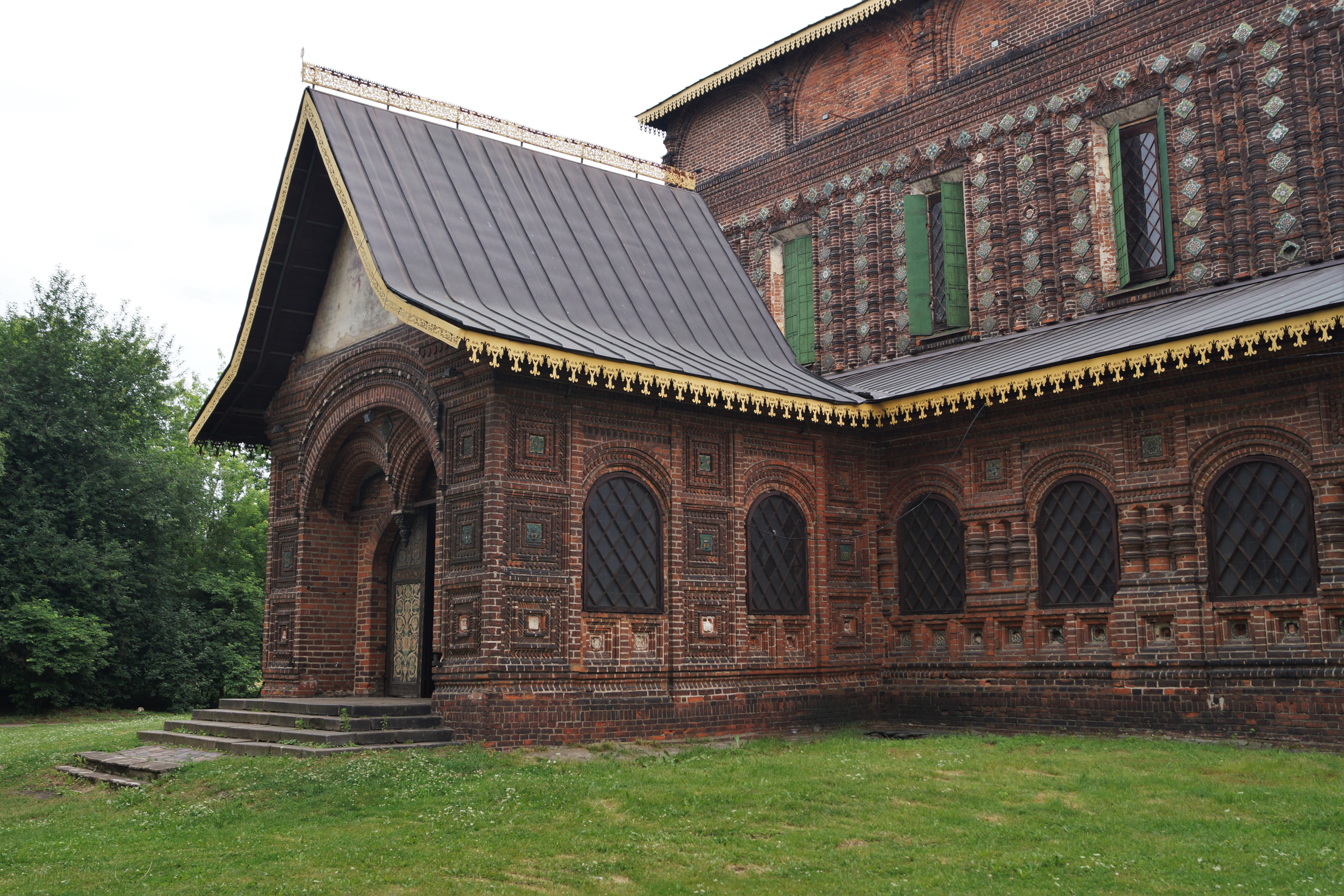
Porch of the Tolchkovo Church, Russia

== See also ==
- Lychgate
