= St Andrew's Church, Congresbury =

Church in Somerset, England

Church of St Andrew
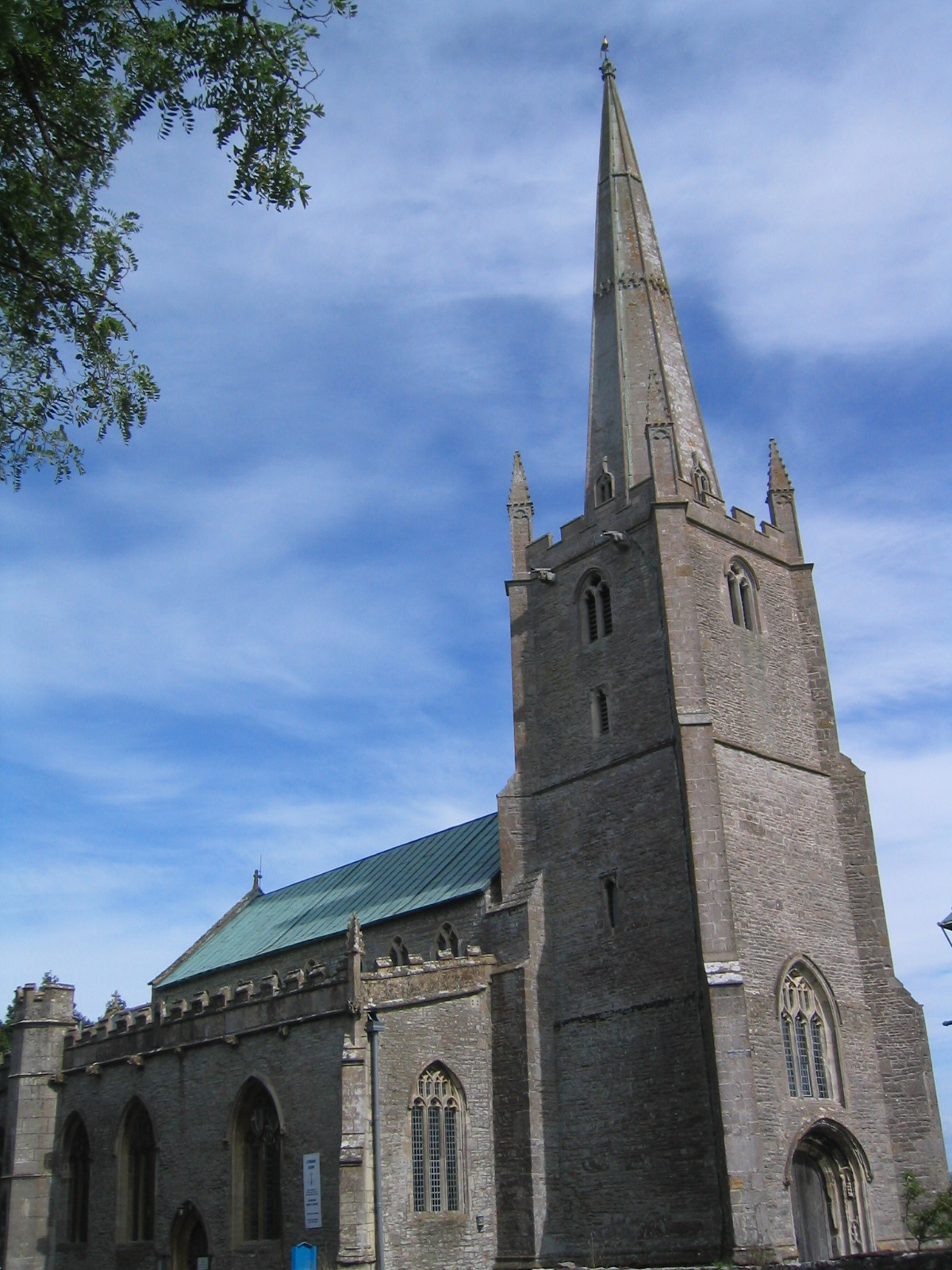

- Location within Somerset

General information
- Location: Congresbury, England
- Coordinates: 51.3697°N 2.8091°W
- Completed: 13th century

The Anglican Church of St Andrew in Congresbury, Somerset, England dates from the 13th century and has been designated as a Grade I listed building.

Congresbury is named after St Congar, who is said to have performed three miracles in the area. The second part of the name is thought to come from burh meaning fortified place. The archaeologist Mick Aston identified an Anglo-Saxon sculpture of St Congar which is believed to have come from St Andrews Church, and which is now in the Museum of Somerset in Taunton.

The present church was consecrated by Bishop Jocelin of Wells on 11 July 1215.

The church was remodelled in the 15th century, in a Perpendicular style; further restorations followed in 1825, 1856 and 1950–2. The nave includes pillars with decorated stone corbels supporting the wooden roof timbers and carved bosses. The organ, which was rebuilt in 1967 is in the chancel. The Merle chapel was formerly known as the Chapel of St Congar. The font is Norman. The tower is surmounted by a spire which rises to 120 feet (37 m).

The Tower contains a heavy ring of 8 Bells, the Tenor (the biggest bell) weighing 3812 lb or 1729 kg and it strikes the note of C. The oldest bells date back to 1606 and were cast by George Purdue.

The parish is part of the benefice of Congresbury with Puxton and Hewish St Ann within the deanery of Locking.

== See also ==
- Grade I listed buildings in North Somerset
- List of Somerset towers
- List of ecclesiastical parishes in the Diocese of Bath and Wells
