= Ken Day =

Ken Day is the name of:

- Ken Day (cricketer) (1919–1991), English cricketer of the 1950s
- Ken Day (rugby league) (1936–1998), Australian rugby league footballer of the 1960s
