= St Mary's Church, Yatton =

Church in Somerset, England

Church of St Mary
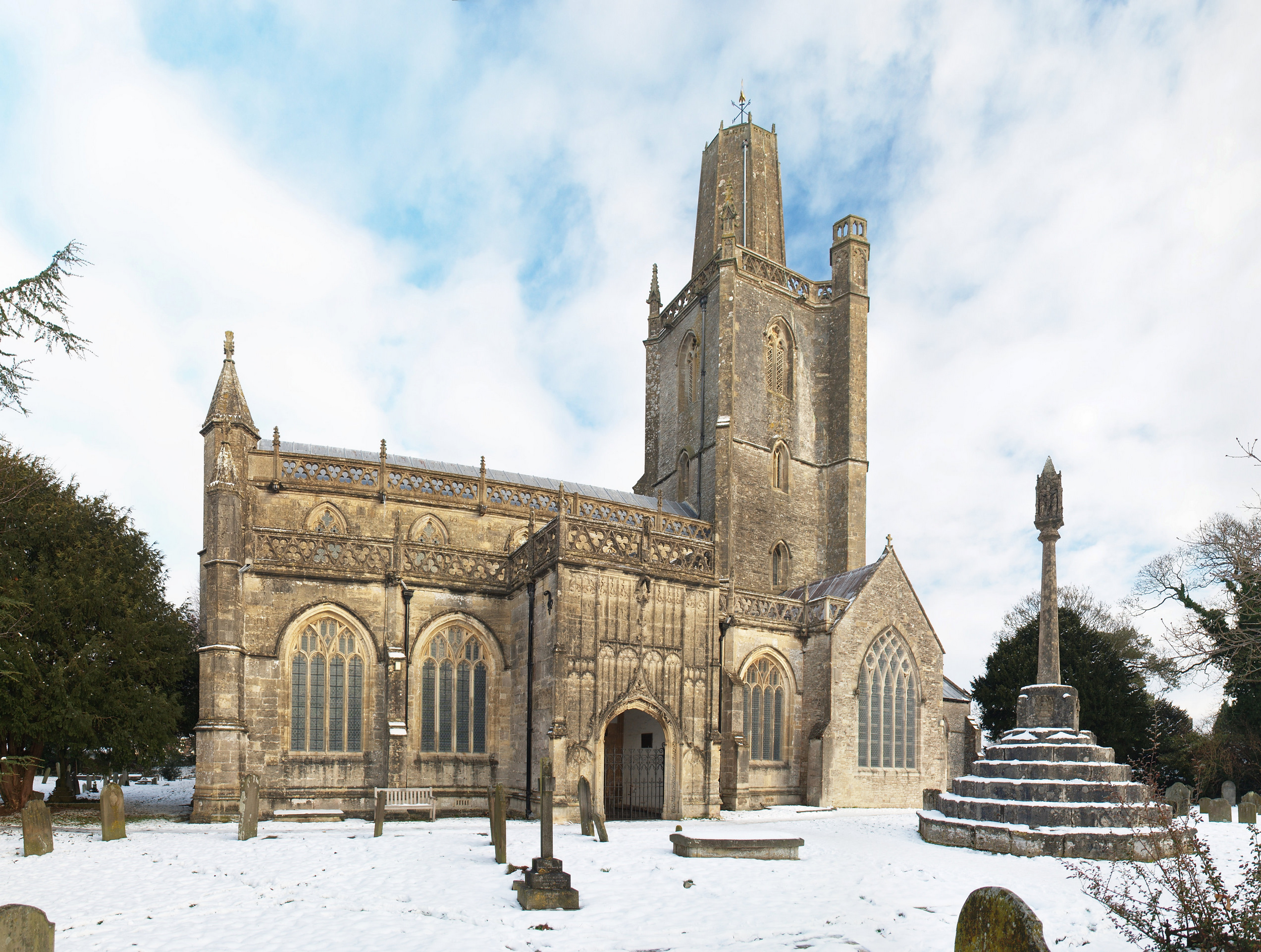
- View from the south-west

- Location within Somerset

General information
- Location: Yatton, England
- Coordinates: 51.3850°N 2.8185°W
- Completed: 14th century

The Church of St Mary in central Yatton, Somerset, England, is often called the Cathedral of the Moors due to its size and grandeur in relation to the town. It has been designated by English Heritage as a Grade I listed building.

While the current church was constructed in the 14th century, it is likely that a previous church was located on the same site. The chapel, which was added in 1496, and various other alterations and expansions of the church have survived since 1445.

The central tower, which was built around 1400, has three stages with diagonal weathered buttresses with crocketed pinnacles. There is a south-east hexagonal stair turret rising above the parapet with panelled sides to the top, and an open cusped parapet. Unusually for Somerset, a Dundry stone steeple was built in 1455–1456. In 1595 freemasons were engaged to take down the spire and reduce it to its present dimensions. There is a ring of bells within the tower. The tower was damaged by fire in 1991, resulting in the fourth bell having to be recast.

The 15th century Old Rectory is also a Grade I listed building.

== See also ==
- List of Grade I listed buildings in North Somerset
- List of towers in Somerset
- List of ecclesiastical parishes in the Diocese of Bath and Wells
