= Urchinwood Manor =

Manor house in Congresbury, Somerset, England

- Location within Somerset
- 51.3684°N 2.7953°W

History
- Built: 1620

Listed Building – Grade II*
- Official name: Urchinwood Manor
- Designated: 9 February 1981
- Reference no.: 1129209

Listed Building – Grade II
- Official name: Barn to north-west of Urchinwood Manor
- Designated: 19 January 1987
- Reference no.: 1129210

Urchinwood Manor is a Grade II* listed building at Congresbury within the English county of Somerset.

Part of the house was built around 1620 with additions being made in the 17th century. The house and surrounding estate has been bought and sold many times over the centuries with the estate now being used as an equestrian centre.

== History ==
The manor of Congresbury, including Urchinwood, was endowed to Queen Elizabeth's Hospital by John Carr in 1586. The two-storey stone house was built by the family of John Young who were the tenants. The exact date is unknown but likely to be before 1620 as the date is recorded on the porch. In 1643 the manor was sold to the local businessman and mayor of Bristol, John Taylor, who gained possession of the house shortly afterwards. In 1693 it passed to Richard Morgan. By the second half of the 18th century the house was owned by George Webb and passed to his descendants and by marriage to William Codrington, who sold it in 1814 to John Philip Miles of the Miles baronets from Leigh Court for £18,826.

In 1834 the estate including the house was sold for £6,650 to the Smyth Pigott family of Brockley Hall. In the middle of the 20th century it was sold to Lt. Colonel John Kenrie La Touche Mardon who sold it to D. Brodie Macdonald.

The 150-acre (61 ha) estate is now used as an equestrian centre.

== Architecture ==
It was renovated and extended in the 17th and 20th centuries, converting the original L-shaped house into a "U". The porch at the front is part of the original building from 1620. It opens into a small hall which would have been the original screens passage. Leading from the hall is an oak panelled dining room and then the Kings room with a massive open fireplace made of moulded stone, which may have been moved to Urchinwood from another house. Some of the wood panelling in the living room had also been brought in from other houses. Several rooms have Jacobean plasterwork ceilings. The earliest part of the house is linked to the 17th century additions by a stone archway.

There is a 17th-century barn to the northwest of the house.

== Bibliography ==
- Cooke, Robert (1957). West Country Houses. Batsford.
- MacDonald, James (2006). A Free Nation Deep in Debt: The Financial Roots of Democracy. Princeton University Press. ISBN 9780691126326.
