= Cadbury Hill =

Iron Age hillfort in Somerset, England

Coordinates: 51.38039°N 2.80316°W

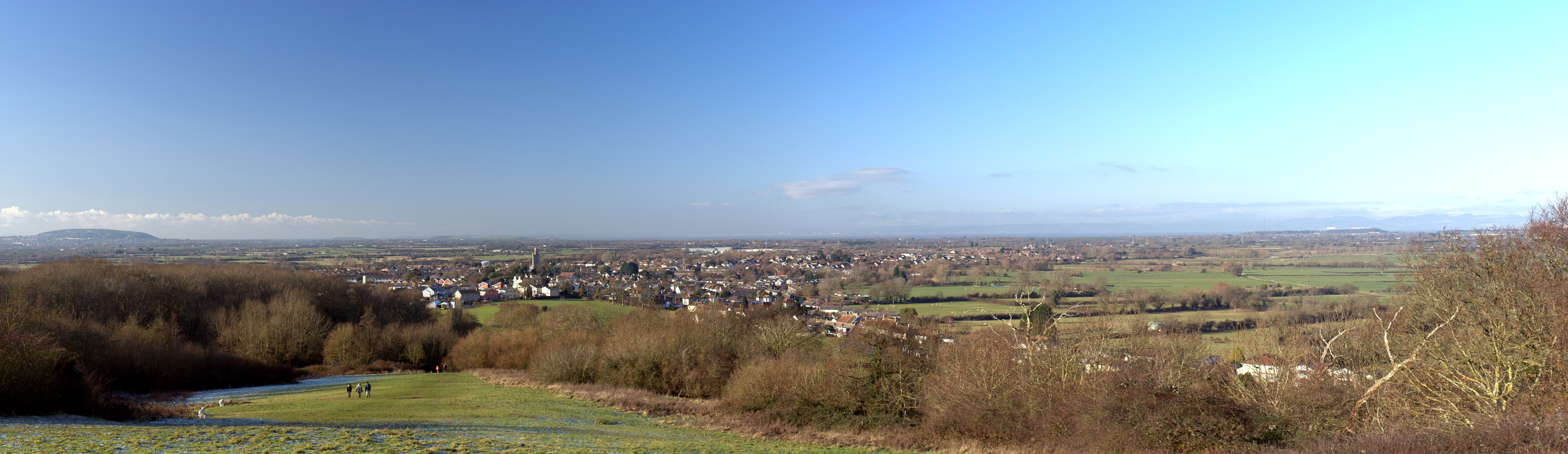
- The view from the Yatton side of Cadbury Hill

Highest point
- Elevation: 81 m (266 ft)
- Prominence: 26 m (85 ft)

Geography
- Location: North Somerset, England
- OS grid: ST442649
- Topo map: OS Landrangers 171, 172

Cadbury Hill is a small hill, mostly in the civil parish of Congresbury, overlooking the village of Yatton in North Somerset. On its summit stands an Iron Age hill fort, which is a Scheduled Ancient Monument.

== Background ==
Hill forts developed in the Late Bronze and Early Iron Age, roughly the start of the 1st millennium BC. The reason for their emergence in Britain, and their purpose has been debated. It has been argued that they could have been military sites constructed in response to invasion from continental Europe, sites built by invaders, or a military reaction to social tensions caused by an increasing population and consequent pressure on agriculture. The dominant view since the 1960s has been that the increasing use of iron led to social changes in Britain. Deposits of iron ore were located in different places to the tin and copper ore necessary to make bronze, and as a result trading patterns shifted and the old elites lost their economic and social status. Power passed into the hands of a new group of people. Archaeologist Barry Cunliffe believes that population increase still played a role and has stated "[the forts] provided defensive possibilities for the community at those times when the stress [of an increasing population] burst out into open warfare. But I wouldn't see them as having been built because there was a state of war. They would be functional as defensive strongholds when there were tensions and undoubtedly some of them were attacked and destroyed, but this was not the only, or even the most significant, factor in their construction".

== Archaeology ==
In archaeological circles, the hill fort is known as Cadbury-Congresbury in order to differentiate it from the Cadbury Castle hillfort in South Cadbury. It appears to have been constructed in the Iron Age when one or more ramparts, with walls and ditches, were built on the steep slopes of the hill to defend an area covering some eight and a half acres. The remains of Iron Age round houses may still be seen inside. The hill fort was refortified around 400, after the urban collapse associated with the withdrawal of Rome, and occupation extended into the sub-Roman period. Before c.500, there is evidence for the presence of a turf and timber watchtower, a timber hall and (sporadic) continued trade with Byzantium, perhaps selling tin.

It has been suggested that this was the monastery of Saint Congar after whom Congresbury was named.

Excavation took place between 1968 and 1973, and was published in 1992 Mediterranean imports were found with 173 A-ware and 547 B-ware sherds and around 48 glass vessels. These suggest that the hill was the site of an elite settlement.

== Wildlife ==
Spring birdsong recorded on Cadbury Hill

Cadbury Hill is a designated Local Nature Reserve. In 2009, a 19th-century agricultural stock pond – previously hidden by undergrowth – was restored by the Yatton & Congresbury Wildlife Action Group (YACWAG). The Local Nature Reserve comprises ancient semi-natural woodland, scrub and unimproved grassland. Species of interest include marsh tit, noctule bat, slow worm, wood anemone, bluebell, betony, small scabious, rock rose, small leaved lime. On the northern limestone slope grow hundreds of common spotted orchids. The hill fort itself has many ant hills, which are visited by green woodpeckers.

The grassy plateau of the hill fort is owned and managed by Yatton and Congresbury Parish Councils and the rest, including a car park and former landfilled quarry, by North Somerset Council.

== See also ==
- List of hill forts and ancient settlements in Somerset
