= Congresbury =

Village in Somerset, England

Coordinates: 51.3677°N 2.8109°W

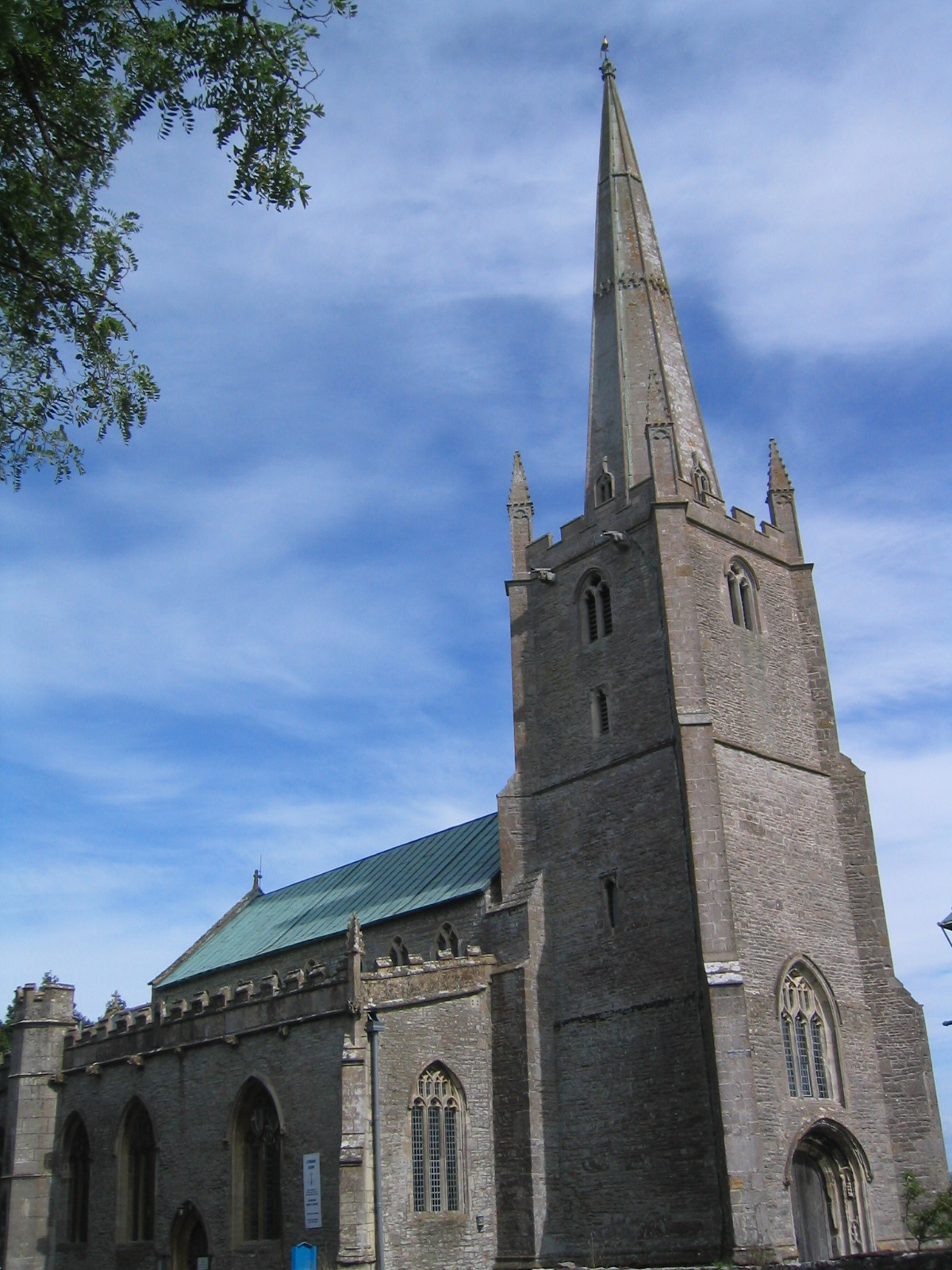
- St Andrew's Church, Congresbury

- Location within Somerset
- Population: 3,497 (2011)
- OS grid reference: ST435635
- Unitary authority: North Somerset
- Ceremonial county: Somerset
- Region: South West
- Country: England
- Sovereign state: United Kingdom
- Post town: Bristol
- Postcode district: BS49
- Dialling code: 01934
- Police: Avon and Somerset
- Fire: Avon
- Ambulance: South Western
- UK Parliament: Wells and Mendip Hills

Congresbury (CONGSbry) is a village and civil parish on the northwestern slopes of the Mendip Hills in North Somerset, England, which in 2011 had a population of 3,497. It lies on the A370 between Junction 21 of the M5 and Bristol Airport, 13 miles (21 km) south of Bristol city centre, and 7 miles (11 km) east of Weston-super-Mare. The Congresbury Yeo river flows through the village. The parish includes the hamlet of Brinsea.

The nearest railway station is Yatton, with trains provided by Great Western Railway, but Congresbury once had its own railway station on the Cheddar Valley Line from Yatton to Wells. It was also the starting point for the Wrington Vale Light Railway, which went to nearby Wrington and Blagdon.

== History ==
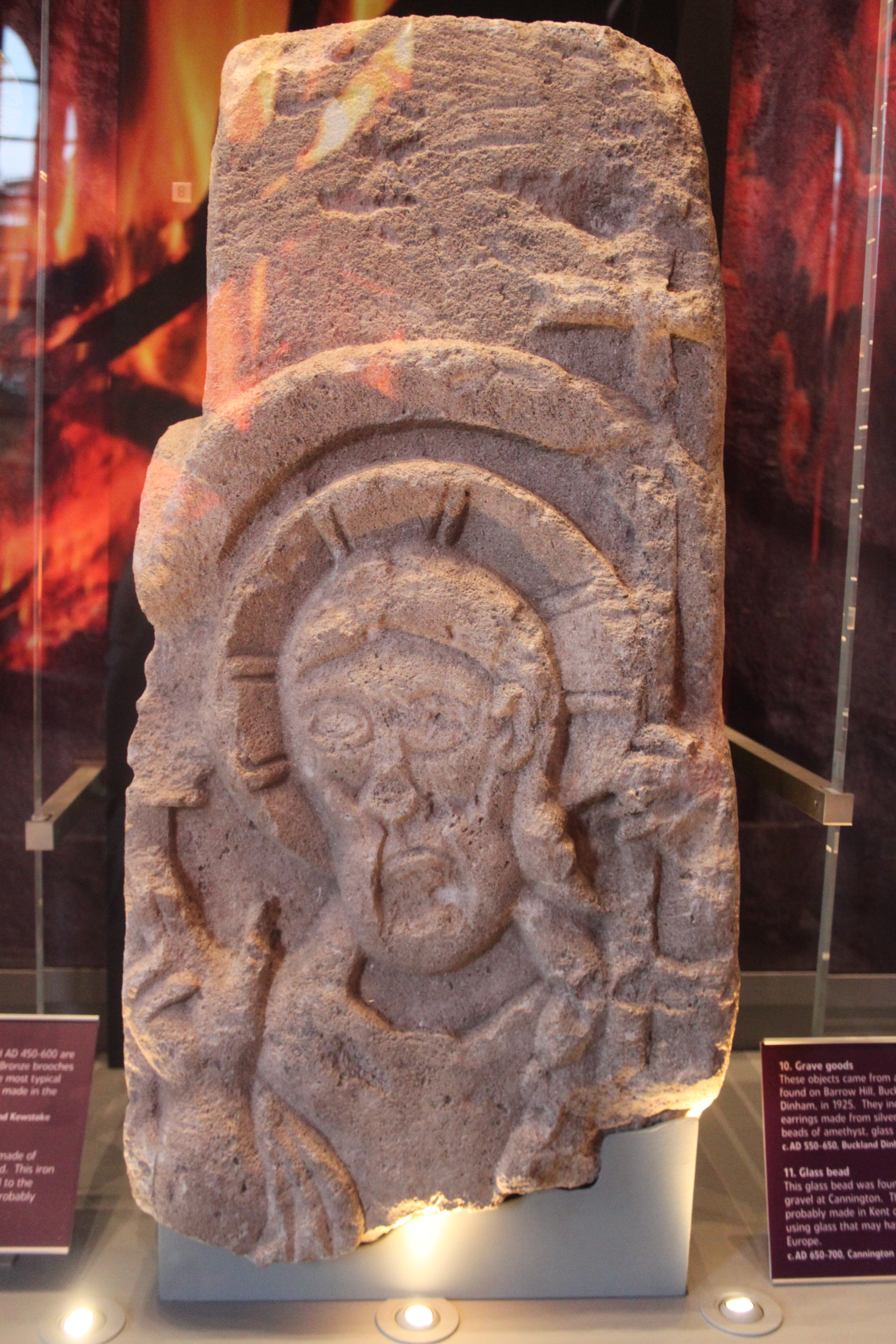
Sculpture of St Congar of Congresbury at the Museum of Somerset

Congresbury is named after St Congar, who is said to have performed three miracles in the area. The second part of the name is thought to come from burh meaning fortified place.

The remains of an Iron Age hill fort at Cadbury Hill have been discovered, as well as a Roman villa, temple and hoard of coins. Christian burial grounds have also been discovered on Cadbury Hill.

The archaeologist Mick Aston identified an Anglo-Saxon sculpture of St Congar which is believed to have come from St Andrew's Church, and which is now in the Museum of Somerset in Taunton. The parish was part of the Winterstoke Hundred.

The village cross dates from the 15th century and is a Grade II* listed building and Scheduled monument. A 2.5 metres (8 ft 2 in) high 15th century cross on an octagonal plinth. The head of the cross was replaced in the early 19th century.

Urchinwood Manor is a Grade II* listed building, part of which was built around 1620 with additions being made in the 17th century. The house and surrounding estate has been bought and sold many times over the centuries with the estate now being used as an equestrian centre.

The Vicarage includes an early 19th-century vicarage and former Priest's House from around 1446. It has been designated as a Grade I listed building.

The village had a school founded in the 1870s that was split into separate infant and junior schools in the early 1970s. In September 2009, the two schools were re-joined as one primary school.

== Governance ==
The parish council has responsibility for local issues, including setting an annual precept (local rate) to cover the council’s operating costs and producing annual accounts for public scrutiny. The parish council evaluates local planning applications and works with the local police, district council officers, and neighbourhood watch groups on matters of crime, security, and traffic. The parish council's role also includes initiating projects for the maintenance and repair of parish facilities, such as the village hall or community centre, playing fields and playgrounds, as well as consulting with the district council on the maintenance, repair, and improvement of highways, drainage, footpaths, public transport, and street cleaning. Conservation matters (including trees and listed buildings) and environmental issues are also of interest to the council.

The parish falls within the unitary authority of North Somerset which was created in 1996, as established by the Local Government Act 1992. It provides a single tier of local government with responsibility for almost all local government functions within its area including local planning and building control, local roads, council housing, environmental health, markets and fairs, refuse collection, recycling, cemeteries, crematoria, leisure services, parks, and tourism. It is also responsible for education, social services, libraries, main roads, public transport, trading standards, waste disposal and strategic planning, although fire, police and ambulance services are provided jointly with other authorities through Avon Fire and Rescue Service, Avon and Somerset Constabulary and South Western Ambulance Service.

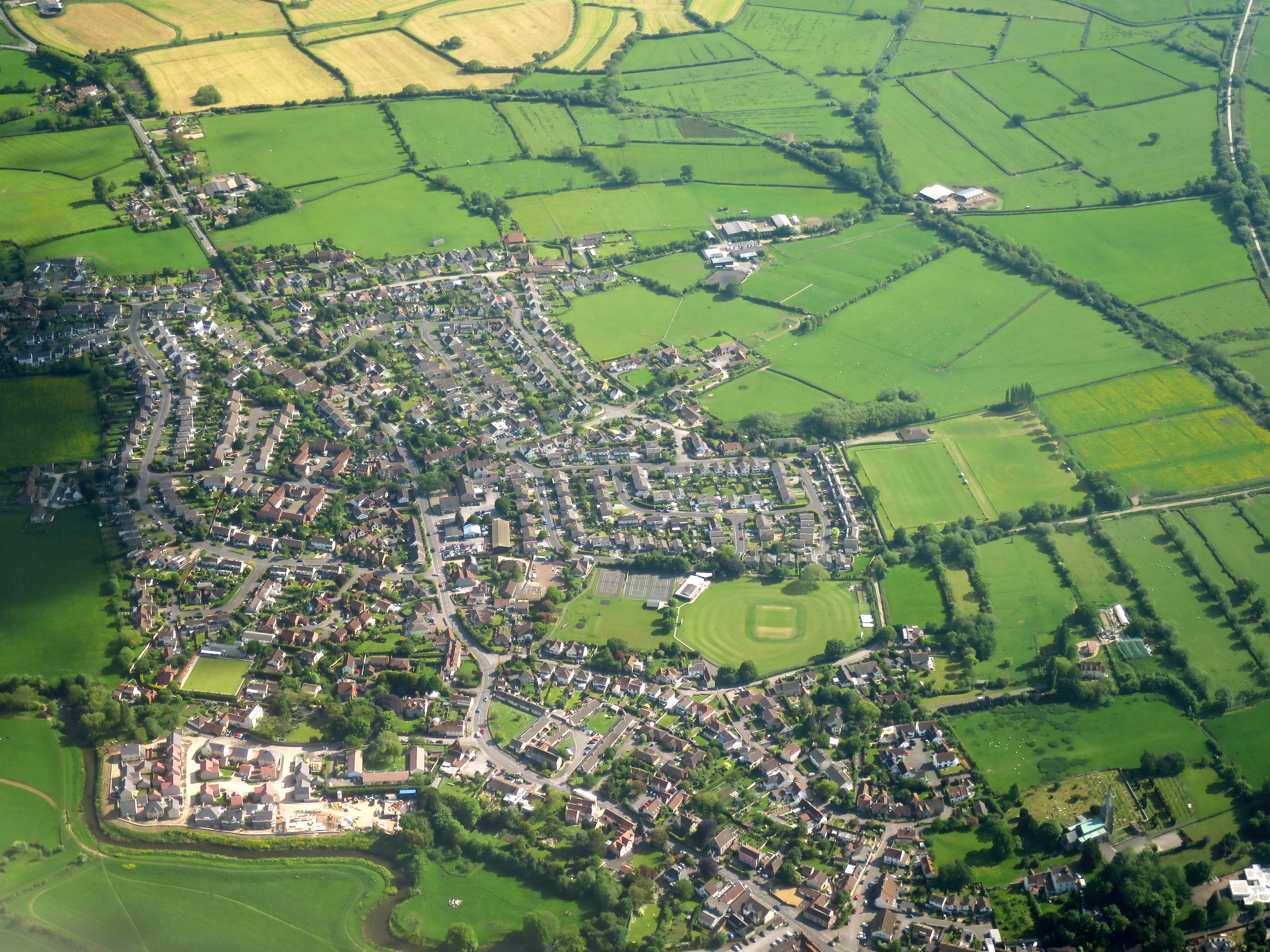
An aerial image of Congresbury

North Somerset's area covers part of the ceremonial county of Somerset but it is administered independently of the non-metropolitan county. Its administrative headquarters is in the town hall in Weston-super-Mare. Between 1 April 1974 and 1 April 1996, it was the Woodspring district of the county of Avon. Before 1974 that the parish was part of the Axbridge Rural District.

An electoral ward exists in Congresbury. The area and population are the same as shown above.

The parish is represented in the House of Commons of the Parliament of the United Kingdom as part of the Wells and Mendip Hills. It elects one Member of Parliament (MP) by the first past the post system of election. It was also part of the South West England constituency of the European Parliament prior to Britain leaving the European Union in January 2020, which elected seven MEPs using the d'Hondt method of party-list proportional representation.

== Facilities ==
Congresbury is a large village and has several public houses with a wide variety of shops and other businesses. Opposite the village cross in the High Street is Broad Street, an unusually wide street suggesting it was a planned arrangement for the weekly market and annual fair.

Congresbury also has a library and War Memorial Hall constructed in 1920. Congresbury community cafe opened at Bridge House in February 2019. Managed entirely by volunteers, it raises funds to support village activities / organisations and local charities,

== Education ==
The local council responsible for education is North Somerset Council. Congresbury has a pre-school and St Andrews Primary School. Secondary education is not available in the village and so many of Congresbury's children commute daily to the nearby village of Churchill to attend Churchill Academy and Sixth Form.

== Religious sites ==
The Anglican Church of St Andrew in Congresbury dates from the 13th century but was extensively altered in the 15th century and has been designated as a Grade I listed building.

There is a Methodist chapel on Brinsea Road (B3133) which was constructed in 1878 to seat 150 people.

== Sport and recreation ==
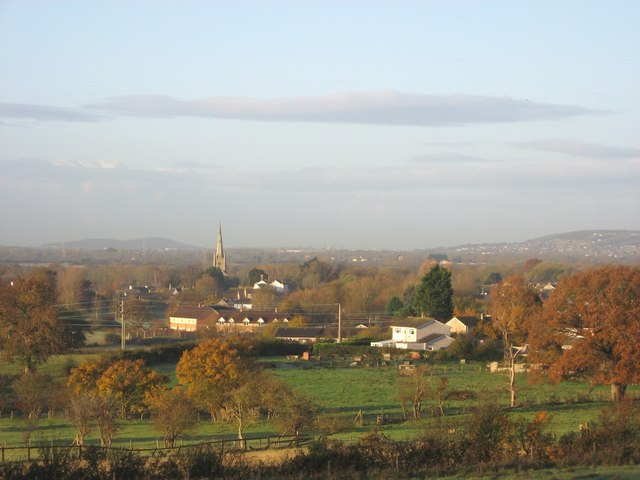
Congresbury

Congresbury has a King George's Field in memorial to King George V. Sporting facilities for the football club, tennis club, and cricket club (formed in 1844), are provided by the umbrella organisation, the Congresbury Recreation Club. The Recreation Club is also home to several skittles teams and darts teams. The village also offers fishing in purpose built lakes and the River Yeo itself.

The hamlet of Brinsea is home to the Mendip Spring Country Club and Golf Course.

In the beginning of the 21st century, Congresbury opened a Millennium Green situated next to the River Yeo and a Millennium Bridge spanning the river to join north and south Congresbury. As well as being a quiet sanctuary, the Millennium Green has also played host to a village music festival. Near to the Millennium Green there is a basketball court.

The village has many recreational groups, including Cubs, Scouts and Brownies, a bell-ringing club, a youth club and the Congresbury Youth Partnership.

In the heart of the village there is also a bowls club, which has an annual competition open to all.

There is an annual village fete held at the primary school.

Congresbury lies next to the Strawberry Line, an old railway line now converted to a pathway for walkers and cyclists to enjoy the countryside with views over the North Somerset Levels and reserves on the Congresbury Moors, which is maintained by the local conservation group, YACWAG.

Since late 2011, plans have been publicised for a skatepark to be built in the village. Potential sites have been identified including the King George IV playing fields, Glebelands and the Millennium Green. By December 2012 campaigners had raised £15,000 of the estimate £100,000 cost, and in 2013 a further donation of £5,000 was made from a police fund.

In 2013 Congresbury became the site for The North Somerset Butterfly House, a tropical butterfly house with a remit to work with the local community and authorities to benefit local conservation initiatives, conservation-based education and the local economy.
