= List of King George V Playing Fields in Somerset =

A King George's Field is a public open space in the United Kingdom dedicated to the memory of King George V (3 June 1865 – 20 January 1936).

Somerset
Location	Formal name	Local name (if any)	National Grid Reference	Dates		External links
Location	Formal name	Local name (if any)	National Grid Reference	Purchase	Opening	External links
Batcombe	King George V Playing Field		ST690389	1937	1938	
Chew Magna	King George V Playing Field		ST 573 631	1938		A Profile of Chew Magna Parish Council by Cllr Sheila Walker
Cleeve	King George V Playing Field		ST 456 657			
Congresbury	King George V Memorial Playing Field		ST 437 635			Congresbury Cricket Club
Minehead	King George V Field		SS 975 456			Minehed Town Council: Responsibilities and Facilities
Trull	Ling George's Playing Field		ST216220			
