= Bob Martin Petcare =

British manufacturer of pet healthcare products

Bob Martin (Uk) Limited
- Company type: Subsidiary
- Industry: Petcare
- Founded: 1892; 133 years ago
- Founder: Robert Martin
- Headquarters: Leeds, West Yorkshire, United Kingdom
- Key people: (Chief executive officer)
- Parent: Martin & Martin Holdings Ltd
- Website: www.bobmartin.co.uk

Bob Martin Petcare (usually known as Bob Martin) is a British domestic pet healthcare company. The company manufactures at two sites in the United Kingdom, and is based in Yatton in North Somerset. The company also has offices in Germany, Italy, France and Spain and two manufacturing sites in South Africa.

== History ==
The company was founded in 1892, originally producing conditioning powders for dogs. Its main company, Bob Martin (UK) Limited, went into administration on 26 November 2019. However, the company's operations were able to survive and staff redundancies were avoided following a rescue deal offered by Pets Choice Limited which saw it take on the healthcare factory, assets and goodwill, as well as acquiring a licence for the brand.

== Current product range ==
The company now markets and produces a wide range of flea, tick and worm products for family pets, pet nutritional supplements, a variety of pet foods, pet cleaning and hygiene products, products to remove pet odours, as well as natural and manufactured snacks and treats. These products are sold in the UK, Europe, and further afield. In 2007, according to Datamonitor, the company was the market leader for pet health care in South Africa.

The company markets products for:

- Dogs
- Cats
- Rabbits
- Guinea pigs
- Other small animals, i.e. hamsters, gerbils, and mice
- Fish
- Caged birds
- Wild birds
