= Congar of Congresbury =

6th-century medieval Christian saint

Congar
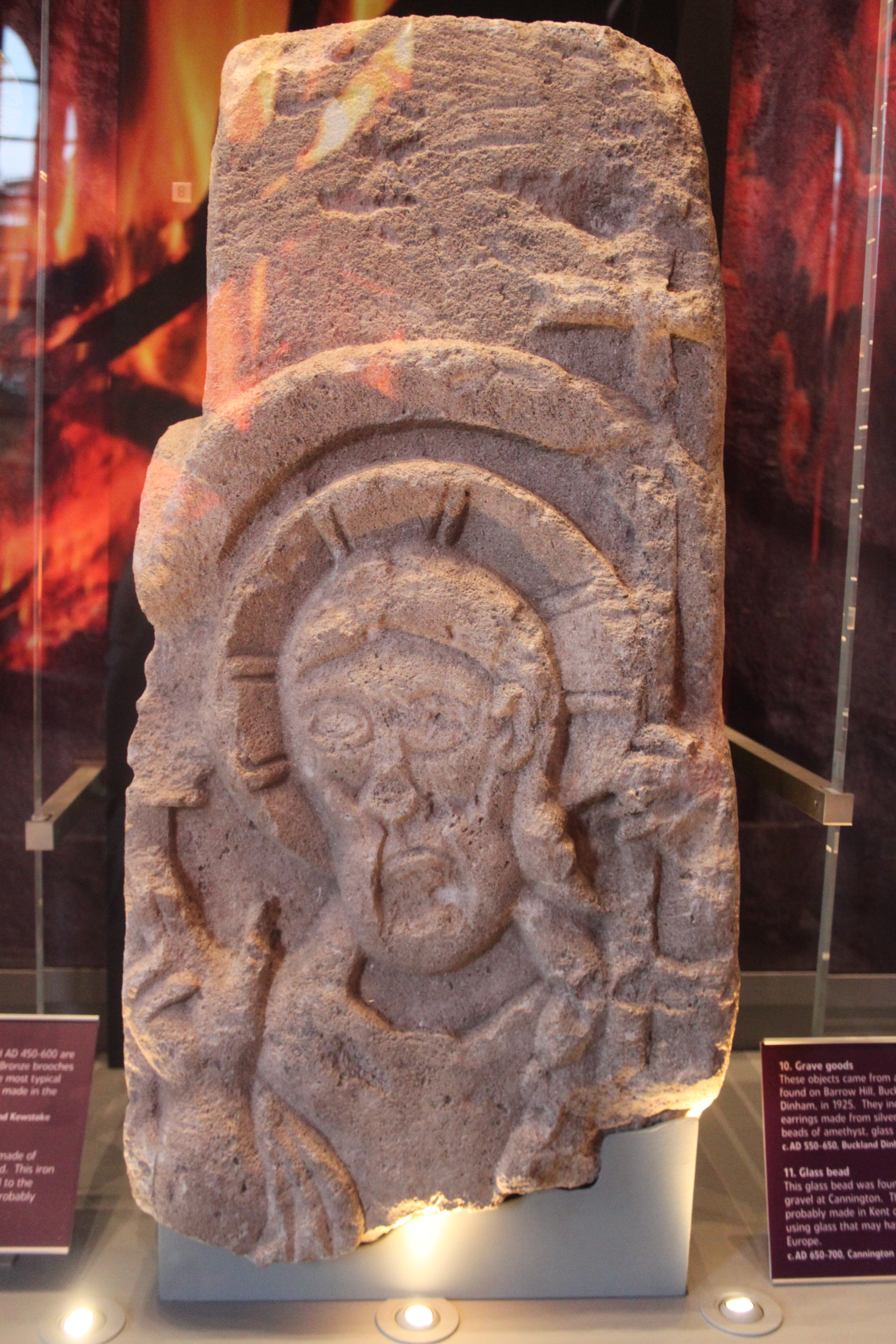
- Sculpture of St Congar of Congresbury at the Museum of Somerset

Abbot & Bishop
- Born: c. 470; Llanwngar in Pembrokeshire
- Died: c. 520; Jerusalem
- Venerated in: Catholic Church; Eastern Orthodox Church; Anglican Communion
- Major shrine: archaologically unknown but said to be Cadbury-Congresbury
- Feast: 27 November

Saint Congar (also Cumgar or Cungar; Welsh: Cyngar; Latin: Concarius) (c. 470 – 27 November 520) was a Welsh abbot and supposed bishop in Somerset, then in the British kingdom of Dumnonia, now in England.

Congar grew up in Pembrokeshire and travelled across the Bristol Channel to found a monastery, which is said to be in Cadbury-Congresbury. He gave his name to this village and to the parish church at Badgworth. This supposedly became the centre of a bishopric which preceded the Diocese of Bath and Wells. Legend has it that his staff took root when he thrust it into the ground and the resulting yew tree can be seen to this day. He later returned to Wales, but died on a pilgrimage to Jerusalem.

The parish of Congresbury claimed to have enshrined Congar's body during the Middle Ages, and mentioned it in several pilgrim guides. There appear to have been no rival claimants for his relics. Congresbury itself is first mentioned in Asser’s Life of Alfred as a derelict Celtic monastery, probably related to Congar. Though a minor saint, he is mentioned in a litany of Winchester in about 1060, and his feast day was recorded in most medieval Somerset calendars.

Churches dedicated to Congar may also be found in Brittany and Cornwall, where he is said to have been a hermit at St Ingunger, in the parish of Lanivet.
