= Ken Day (cricketer) =

English cricketer

Personal information
- Full name: Frederick Gordon Kenneth Day
- Born: 25 June 1919; Yatton, Somerset, England
- Died: 9 December 1991 (aged 72); Whitchurch, Bristol, England
- Batting: Right-handed

Domestic team information
- Years: Team
- 1950–1956: Somerset

Career statistics
Competition	FC
Matches	7
Runs scored	201
Batting average	18.27
100s/50s	0/1
Top score	56*
Catches/stumpings	7/8
- Source: CricketArchive, 22 December 2015

Frederick George Kenneth Day (25 June 1919 in Yatton, Somerset – 9 December 1991 in Whitchurch, Bristol) played first-class cricket for Somerset in seven matches in 1950 and 1956.

An amateur right-handed batsman and a wicketkeeper, Day played in a first-class early-season friendly match for Somerset against Glamorgan in 1950, making 29 not out and 4 in the two innings, and making four stumpings. But with the reliable and normally fit Harold Stephenson as the regular Somerset wicketkeeper, and the county not running, until 1956, a regular second eleven, Day went back into Bristol club cricket, where he was a wicketkeeper and opening batsman for Knowle Cricket Club.

It was in 1956 that Day reappeared in first-class cricket. Stephenson was injured early in the season and Day played in six consecutive matches across the month of May. His wicketkeeping, said Wisden Cricketers' Almanack, showed "much ability" and he also proved capable with the bat. In his first match, he made 43 of the last 58 runs in Somerset's only innings against Leicestershire at Taunton. And the following game, he made an unbeaten 56 out of 85 at Old Trafford against a Lancashire attack that included Brian Statham, Roy Tattersall and Malcolm Hilton.

At the end of May, Stephenson returned to the Somerset side and Day did not play first-class cricket again. "In different circumstances," says one directory of Somerset cricketers, "he could well have established himself at county level. As a batsman he took few risks, scoring more than 30 centuries for Knowle CC as a reward for that diligence."
