= Yatton =

Village in Somerset, England

Coordinates: 51.3855°N 2.8256°W

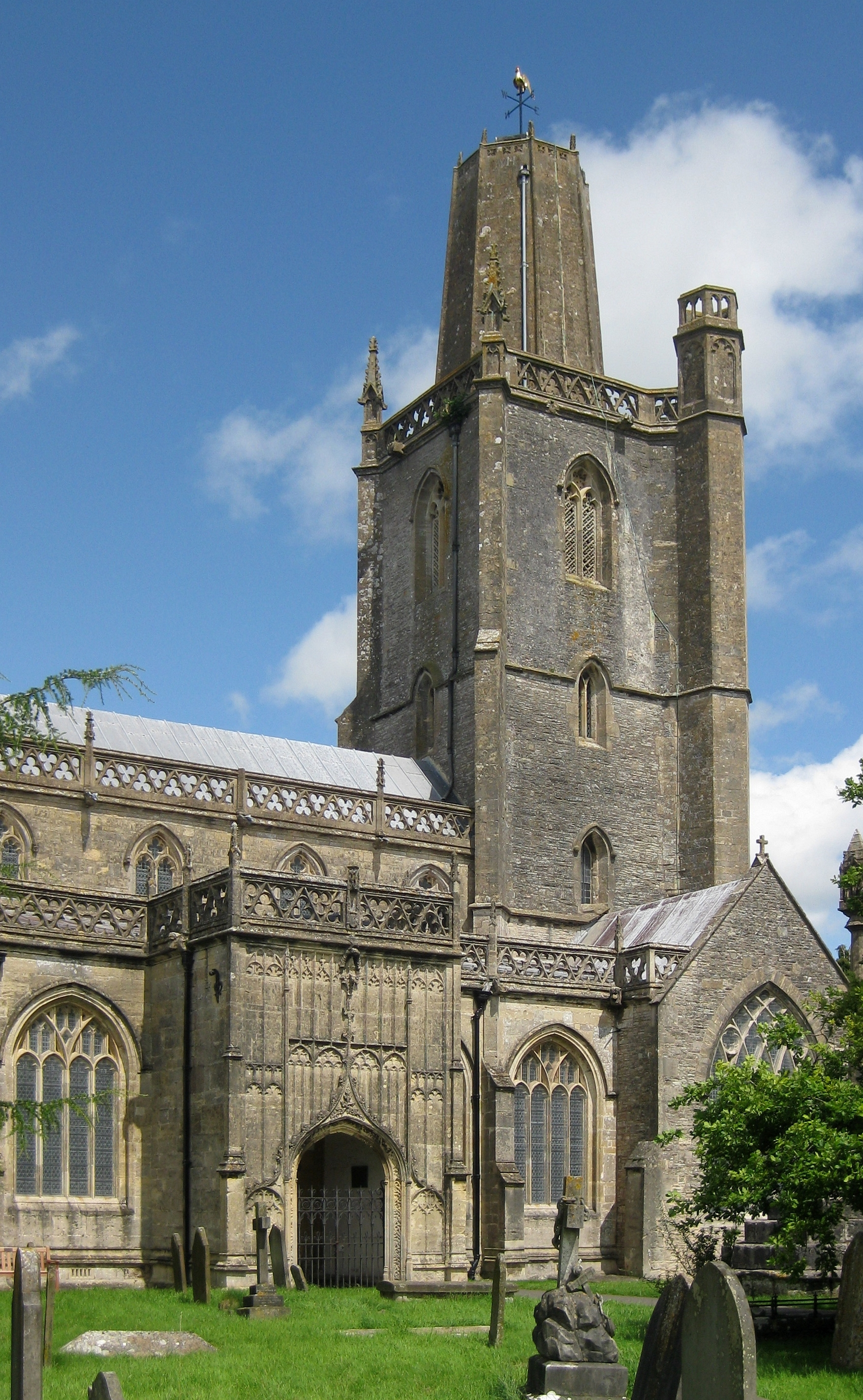
- Church of St Mary

- Location within Somerset
- Population: 7,552
- OS grid reference: ST425655
- Unitary authority: North Somerset
- Ceremonial county: Somerset
- Region: South West
- Country: England
- Sovereign state: United Kingdom
- Post town: BRISTOL
- Postcode district: BS49
- Dialling code: 01934
- Police: Avon and Somerset
- Fire: Avon
- Ambulance: South Western
- UK Parliament: Wells and Mendip Hills

Yatton is a village and civil parish within the unitary authority of North Somerset, which falls within the ceremonial county of Somerset, England. It is located 11 miles (18 km) south-west of Bristol. Its population in 2011 was 7,552. The parish includes Claverham, a small village which was originally a farming hamlet.

The origins of the village and its name are unclear; however, there is evidence of Iron Age hill fort and a Roman villa in the area. The arrival of the railway in the 19th century and more recent road building have led to expansion of the village with Yatton now acting as a home to many commuters, while also supporting manufacturing industry and commerce. The village is located on the North Somerset Levels, where the low-lying land, a mixture of peat, estuarine alluvium and low hills of sand and gravel, is crossed by a myriad of watercourses, providing a habitat for several scarce species.

St Mary's Church dates from the 14th century and there are a range of other places of worship. In addition to religious groups, Yatton has several sporting clubs and other community groups.

== History ==
=== Toponymy ===
The origin of the name Yatton is uncertain. It may come from the Anglo-Saxon 'gatton' meaning 'village on the track'; the track in question is a path of limestone leading from Cadbury Hill. The village has at one time or another been called Jatune, Eaton (from ea [river] and tun i.e. the settlement on the River Yeo and Yatton Blewitt), and is recorded as Lature in the Domesday Book. West Yatton was also known as Yatton-Kaynes in the Elizabethan era.

=== Pre-history ===
Situated on an area of slightly higher, drained ground surrounded by moorland (locally called a 'batch'), Yatton was a well-established village by Norman times. The remains of an Iron Age hill fort at Cadbury Hill have been discovered, as well as a Roman villa, temple and hoard of coins. Older Christian burial grounds have also been discovered on Cadbury Hill.

The parish was part of the Winterstoke Hundred.

=== Railway ===
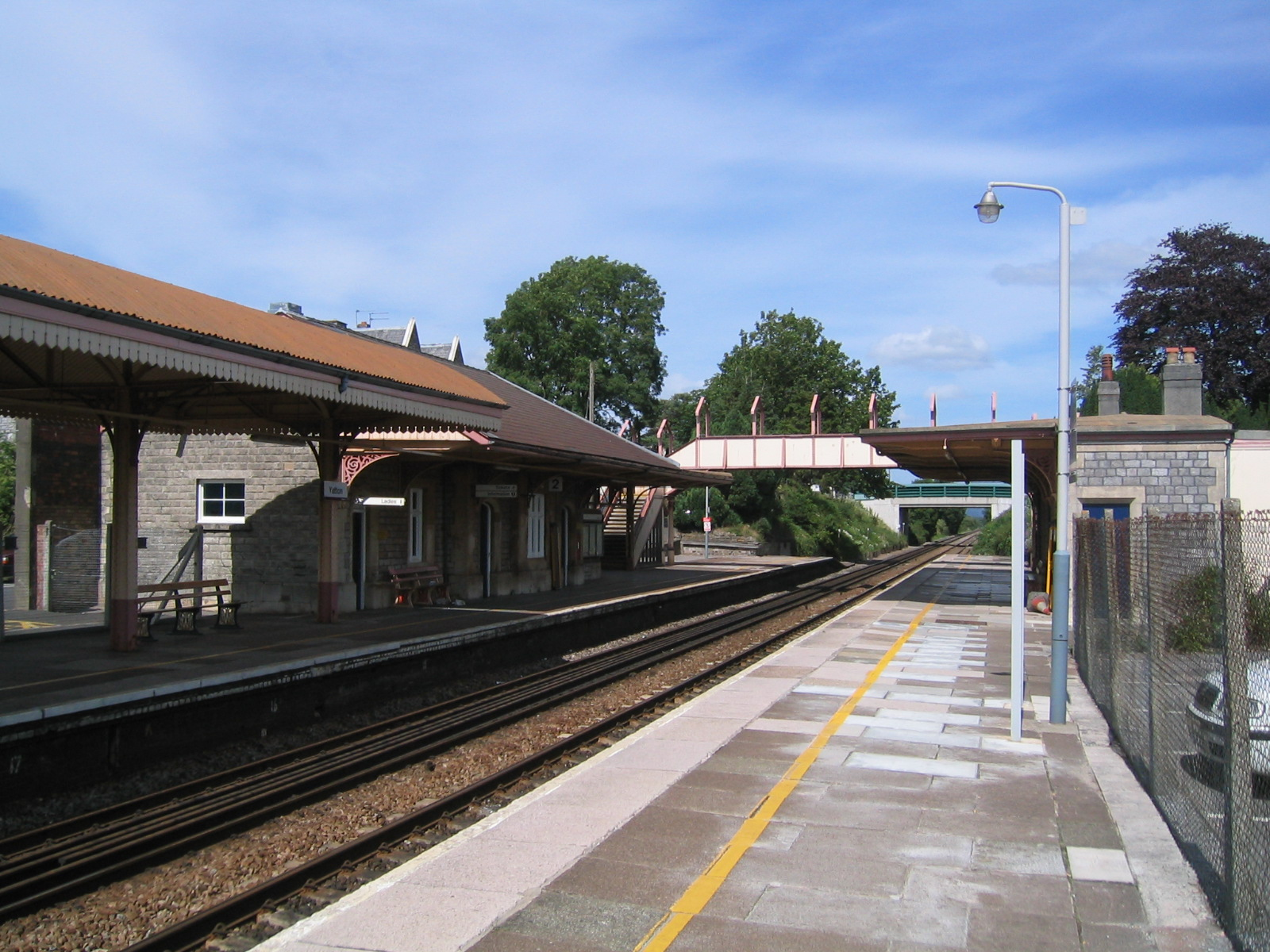
Yatton railway station

In the 1840s, the Bristol & Exeter Railway, with Isambard Kingdom Brunel as consulting engineer, was opened. It was initially leased to the Great Western Railway (GWR) but taken back into full ownership in 1849 and gained its own individuality which lasted until 1876 when all the broad gauge companies in the West Country merged into an enlarged GWR. The station was originally called Clevedon Road and renamed Yatton Junction when the Clevedon branch was built in 1847. Other branches followed, to Cheddar/Wells (1869) and the Wrington Vale Light Railway (1901) to Blagdon from Congresbury.

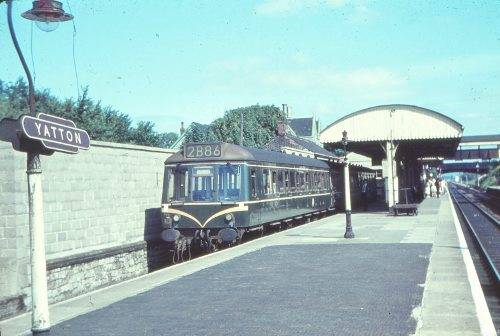
Train waits at Yatton station to depart to Clevedon on 31 August 1962

Although the branch line to Blagdon was closed to passengers in 1932, and the Clevedon and Cheddar/Wells lines were closed during the 1960s, the classically Victorian station designed by Brunel is still in use. From 2001 to 2006 the station was operated by Wessex Trains when, in an echo of 1876, it was again absorbed into the new Greater Western Trains Co. It is now possible to walk or cycle along the former route of the Strawberry Line (so called because of the trade in Cheddar's strawberries) from Yatton to Cheddar. A local group successfully raised funding to establish a community cafe in the old waiting room building at the station, and the cafe opened for business in December 2010. Prior to local authority cutbacks, Bakers Dolphin maintained a replacement bus connection between Yatton and Clevedon. There is currently no public transport connection to Clevedon.

=== 20th century ===
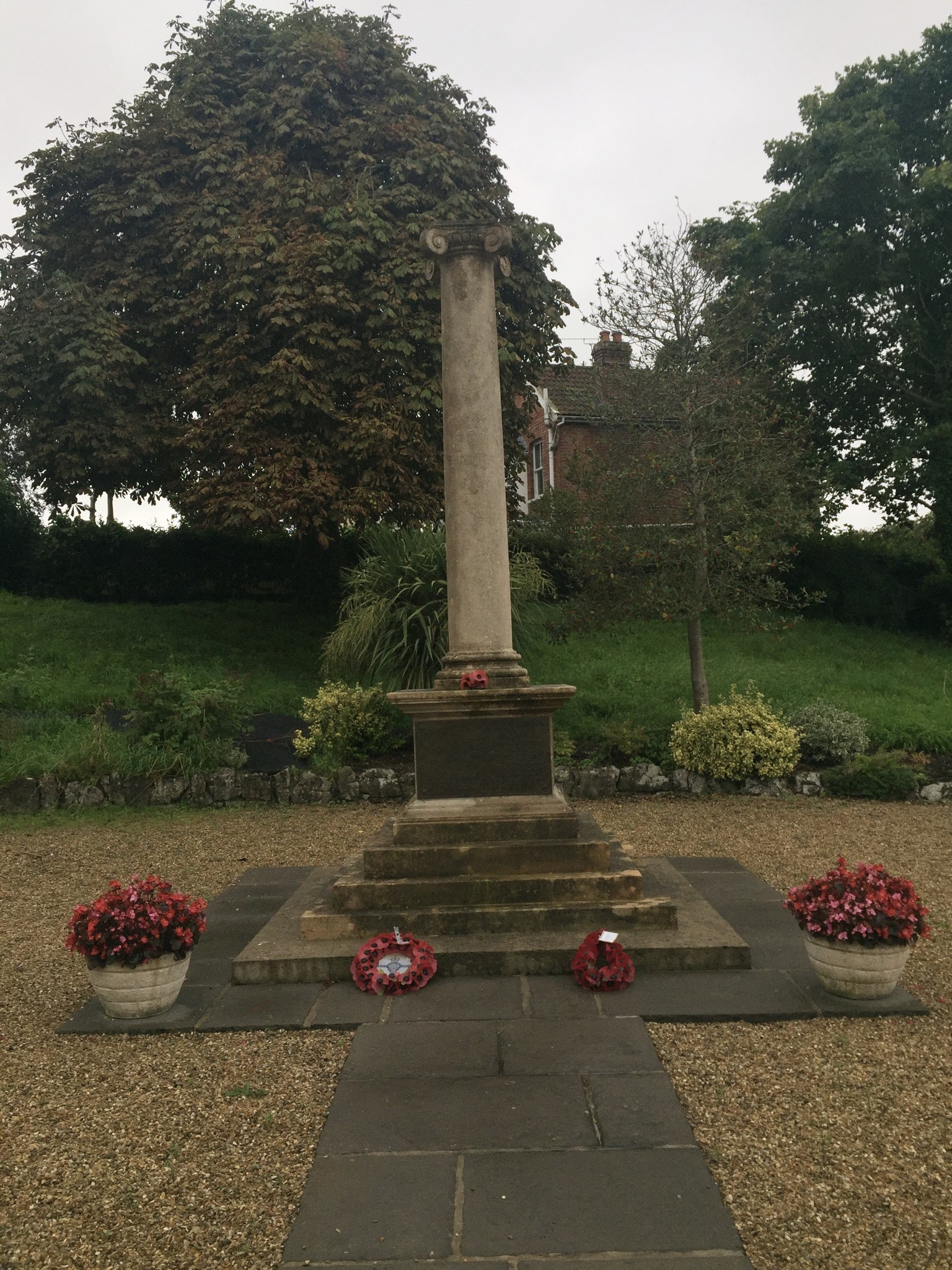
Yatton Parish War Memorial

In 1922 the site formerly known as 'The Pound' was purchased and the Yatton Parish War Memorial was erected. The memorial is located at Top Scaur, at the Congresbury end of the High Street, and is inscribed with the names of Yatton villagers who died in the First and Second World Wars. Each year on Remembrance Sunday a march is held from St Mary's Church to the memorial, where wreaths are laid by villagers and local organisations.

The village has continued to increase in size with several new developments planned or currently being constructed north of the railway station near North End Road and Arnold's Way. Development to the south and east of the village has made the villages of Yatton, Claverham and Cleeve almost continuous as far as the A370. Cadbury House Country Club is being developed to become a 60-room hotel and leisure centre.

The hamlet of North End lies to the north of the North End roundabout, just before the junction for Kingston Seymour, and contains around 30 properties, including a number of farms.

== Governance ==
The parish council, which has 18 members, has responsibility for local issues, including setting an annual precept (local rate) to cover the council's operating costs and producing annual accounts for public scrutiny. The parish council evaluates local planning applications and works with the local police, district council officers, and neighbourhood watch groups on matters of crime, security and traffic. The parish council's role also includes initiating projects for the maintenance and repair of parish facilities, such as the village hall or community centre, playing fields and playgrounds, as well as consulting with the district council on the maintenance, repair and improvement of highways, drainage, footpaths, public transport and street cleaning. Conservation matters (including trees and listed buildings) and environmental issues are also of interest to the council.

The parish falls within the unitary authority of North Somerset which was created in 1996, as established by the Local Government Act 1992. It provides a single tier of local government with responsibility for almost all local government functions within its area including local planning and building control, local roads, council housing, environmental health, markets and fairs, refuse collection, recycling, cemeteries, crematoria, leisure services, parks and tourism. It is also responsible for education, social services, libraries, main roads, public transport, trading standards, waste disposal and strategic planning, although fire, police and ambulance services are provided jointly with other authorities through the Avon Fire and Rescue Service, Avon and Somerset Constabulary and the South Western Ambulance Service.

North Somerset's area covers part of the ceremonial county of Somerset but it is administered independently of the non-metropolitan county. Its administrative headquarters is in the town hall in Weston-super-Mare. Between 1 April 1974 and 1 April 1996, it was the Woodspring district of the county of Avon. Before 1974 that the parish was part of the Long Ashton Rural District.

An electoral ward exists with the same name. The ward stretches to the Bristol Channel and therefore includes Kingston Seymour in addition to Yatton. The total ward population taken from the 2011 census was 9,273.

The parish is represented in the House of Commons of the Parliament of the United Kingdom as part of the Wells and Mendip Hills constituency. It elects one Member of Parliament (MP) by the first past the post system of election.

== Geography ==
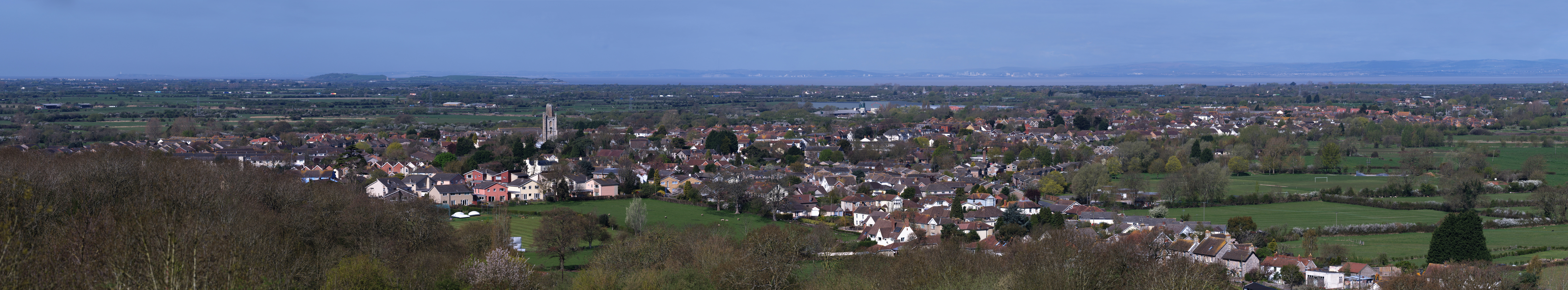
Panoramic view of Yatton from Cadbury Hill. In the distance on the left are Flat Holm, Sand Point and Woodspring Priory. The Church of St Mary is the most prominent landmark in Yatton; in the distance one can see the Church of All Saints in Kingston Seymour. On the other side of the Severn Estuary are the South Wales coast and Cardiff. The panorama is bisected by the M5 motorway and the Great Western Railway.

The area around Yatton and Claverham, which falls within the North Somerset Levels, is a mixture of peat, estuarine alluvium and low hills of sand and gravel with, to the south the limestone ridge of Cadbury Hill, which rises to 250 feet (76 m). On its summit stands an Iron Age hill fort known, in archaeological circles, as Cadbury-Congresbury in order to differentiate it from the Cadbury hillfort in South Cadbury. It appears to have been constructed in the Iron Age when one or more ramparts, with walls and ditches, were built on the steep slopes of the hill to defend an area covering some 8.5 acres (34,000 m^{2}).

Biddle Street has been designated as a Site of Special Scientific Interest where management practices and the variation in the soils has resulted in the watercourses supporting a wide range of aquatic plant communities. Where open water occurs plants such as common water-starwort (Callitriche stagnalis), European frogbit (Hydrocharis morsusranae), fan-leaved water-crowfoot (Ranunculus circinatus). The calcareous influence of the underlying Compton soils also encourages whorled water-milfoil (Myriophyllum verticillatum) and stonewort (Chara sp). Also present are the nationally scarce rootless duckweed (Wolffia arrhiza) and hairlike pondweed (Potamogeton trichoides).

Along with the rest of South West England, Yatton has a temperate climate generally wetter and milder than the rest of England. The annual mean temperature is about 10 °C (50 °F) with seasonal and diurnal variations, but the modifying effect of the sea restricts the range to less than that in most other parts of the United Kingdom. January is the coldest month with mean minimum temperatures between 1 °C (34 °F) and 2 °C (36 °F). July and August are the warmest, with mean daily maxima around 21 °C (70 °F). In general, December is the dullest month and June the sunniest. The south-west of England enjoys a favoured location, particularly in summer, when the Azores High extends its influence north-eastwards towards the UK.

Cloud often forms inland, especially near hills, and reduces exposure to sunshine. The average annual sunshine is about 1,600 hours. Rainfall tends to be associated with Atlantic depressions or with convection. In summer, convection caused by solar surface heating sometimes forms shower clouds and a large proportion of the annual precipitation falls from showers and thunderstorms at this time of year. Average rainfall is around 800–900 mm (31–35 in). About 8–15 days of snowfall is typical. November to March have the highest mean wind speeds, with June to August having the lightest; the prevailing wind direction is from the south-west.

== Demography ==
After the Second World War the size and population of Yatton expanded dramatically. With a railway providing good access to Weston-super-Mare, Bristol and London, and similarly good access by road, the village saw large amounts of new housing development. Today the number of pre-war buildings is much smaller than the number of more recent residential and commercial constructions. According to the 2001 census, Yatton's population was 9,176.

== Economy ==
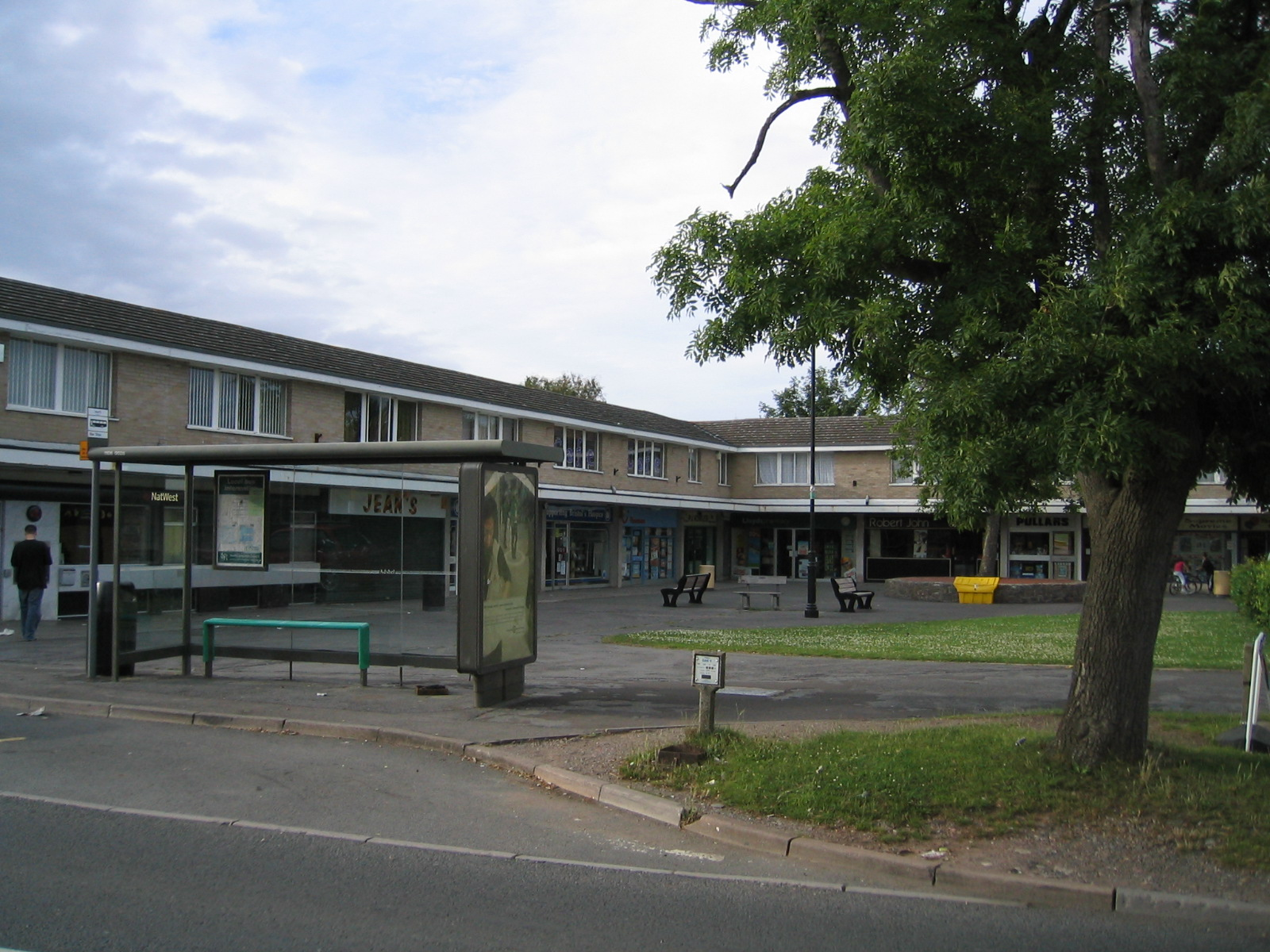
Page's Court, known locally as 'The Precinct'

Today Yatton is a large village. Page's Court — the village's shopping precinct — includes a supermarket and several local shops and takeaways.

There are a number of local businesses, including Pullin's Bakers, Costain Technology Solutions (formerly Simulation Systems Ltd), Stowell Concrete, Smart Systems, Oxford Instruments, and Bob Martin Petcare. Farming remains an important activity in the area.

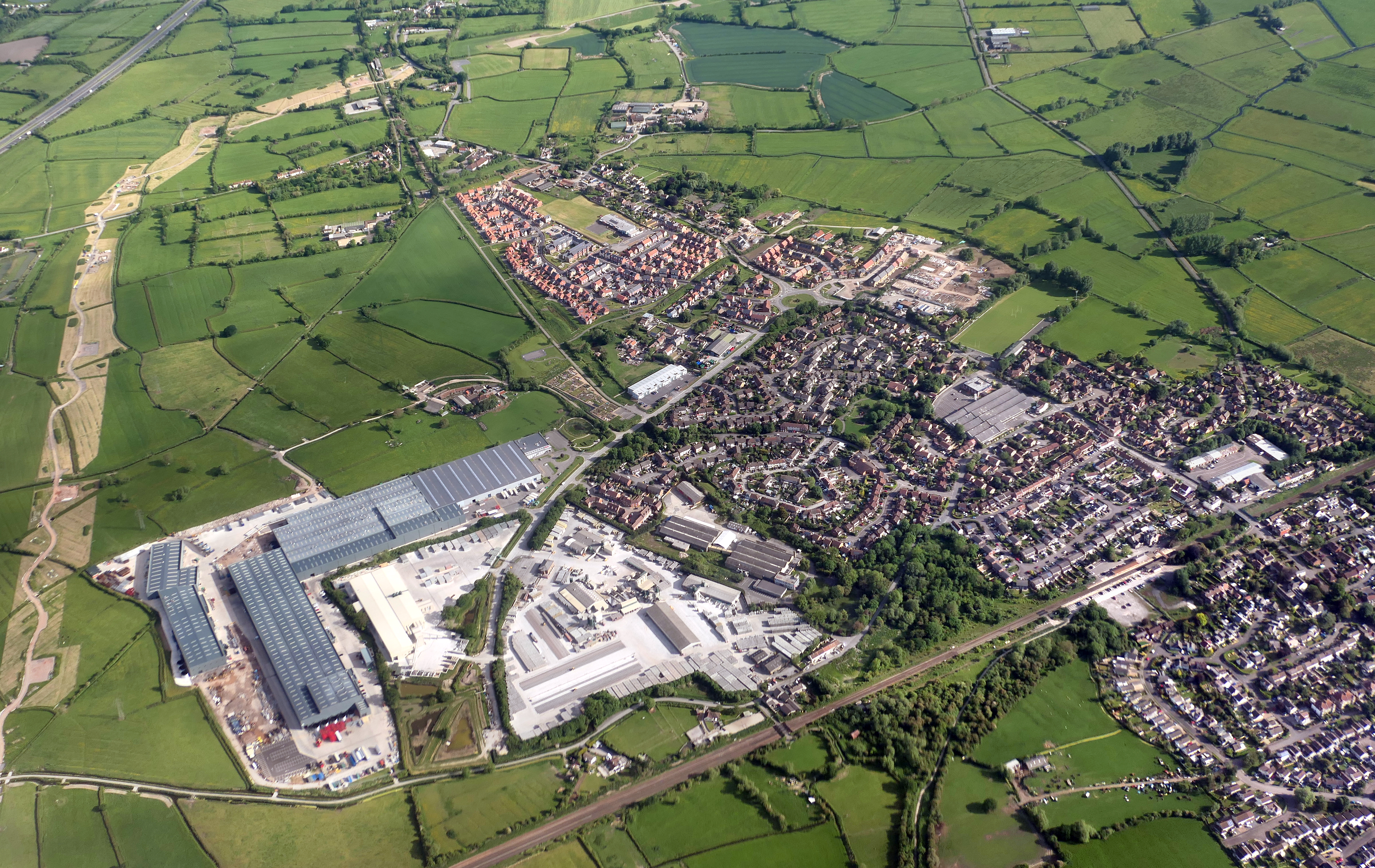
View of the northern third of Yatton and the Smart Systems plant

Fairey Hydraulics was sited in Claverham, becoming Claverham Ltd in 1998. The site closed in 2017, and is today a housing estate.

== Education ==
The local education authority is North Somerset Council. Yatton has a pre-school, infant and junior schools.

Secondary education is not available in the village, and so many of Yatton's children commute daily to the nearby village of Backwell in order to attend Backwell School. The school is a specialist Arts College, and includes a sixth form and takes pupils from the age of 11 (Year 7) to the age of 18 (Year 13). In November 2008, Backwell School was rated as outstanding by Ofsted.

== Religious sites ==
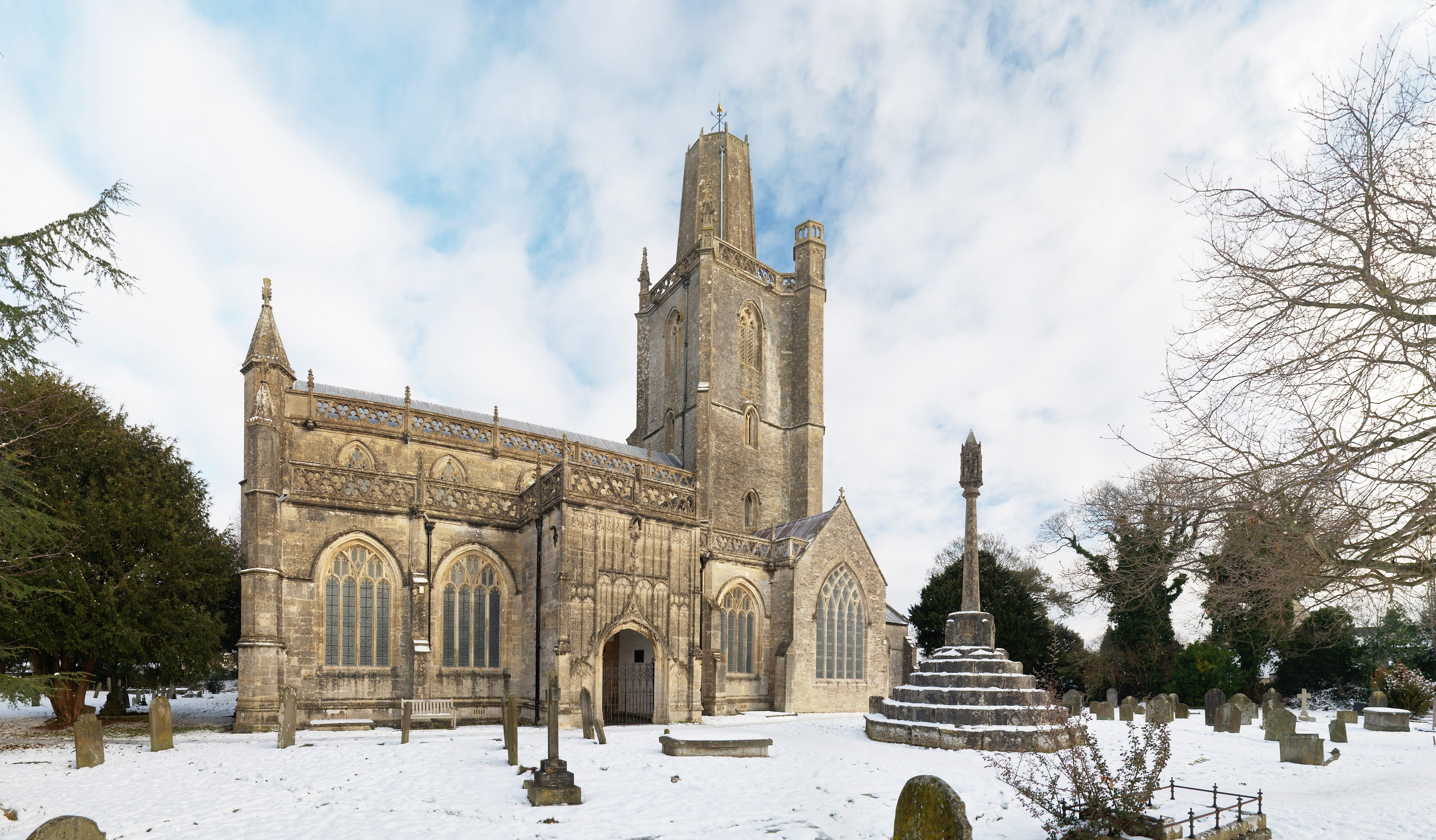
The south side of St Mary's church

St Mary's Church, in central Yatton, built around 1400, is often called the "Cathedral of the Moors" since it is so large compared to the village. The tower has three stages with diagonal weathered buttresses with crocketed pinnacles. There is a south-east hexagonal stair turret rising above the parapet with panelled sides to the top, and an open cusped parapet. There are stained glass windows with the coats of arms of local lords of the manor. It has been designated by English Heritage as a Grade I listed building. The Old Rectory was a Prebendary house, built in the 15th century and has also been designated as a Grade I listed building.

As well as St Mary's (Church of England), Yatton has Methodist, Catholic and independent places of worship. Yatton Methodist Church is situated on the High Street, opposite the main shopping precinct. Horsecastle Chapel, an independent evangelical church, is on Horsecastle Farm Road. River of Life Church, (was YCF) affiliated to the Assemblies of God, meets in Yatton Infant School. St Dunstan's, a Roman Catholic chapel of ease to the parish in Clevedon, is on Claverham Road.

The church of St. Barnabas in Claverham, dates from 1879 and is a grade II listed building. Along with churches in Kenn, Cleeve and Kingston Seymour the churches are managed as part of the Yatton Moor Team Ministry.

== Sports ==
There are active cricket, football and rugby clubs, two parks (Hangstones and Rock Road), a number of public houses, and many other leisure and sporting activities, including the Cleeve Claverham and Yatton Scout Group.

Yatton Rugby Club was founded in 1968 and as of the end of the 2015/16 season, were promoted to the Western Counties North division, having won the Tribute Somerset Premier League for 2015/16. They run three senior sides and have an extensive junior set-up.

Claverham (Yatton) Cricket Club was formed in 1905 and provides cricket to all playing levels and ages. The senior teams play in the ECB West of England Premier League.

== Public services ==
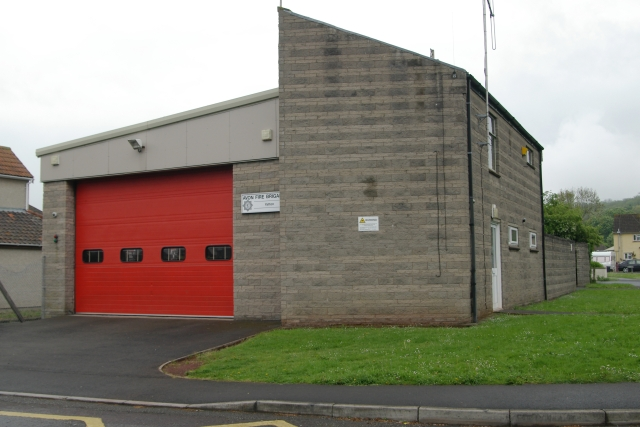
Fire station

Yatton fire station opened in 1947, after the Fire Services Act 1947, when fire service responsibility transferred from national government to local authority control after World War II. The current station was built in 1973. Today, Yatton fire station, which is part of Avon Fire and Rescue Service, runs with two appliances, a water tender ladder and a specialist hose-laying vehicle.

The Yatton firefighters work on a retained duty system, which means that they do not work at the fire station, but are called to the station when a fire breaks out. They respond to emergencies in a 62 square miles (161 km^{2}) area covering Yatton, Cleeve, Kingston Seymour, Congresbury, Wrington and Blagdon, with an average of 130–150 callouts per year. Calls vary from small grass fires to full major alerts and road traffic accidents on the busy A370 main road. The Avon Fire and Rescue Service named Yatton Fire Station was named "highest performing retained duty station" for 2010.

== Notable people ==
George Lukins, also known as the Yatton daemoniac, was an individual famous for his alleged demonic possession and the subsequent exorcism that occurred in 1788. Ken Day was born in Yatton in 1919 and played first-class cricket for Somerset County Cricket Club in seven matches between 1950 and 1956. Major Richard Foord, Liberal Democrat MP for Tiverton and Honiton, lived in Yatton for nineteen years.
