= The Old Rectory, Yatton =

Building in Yatton, Somerset, England

The Old Rectory
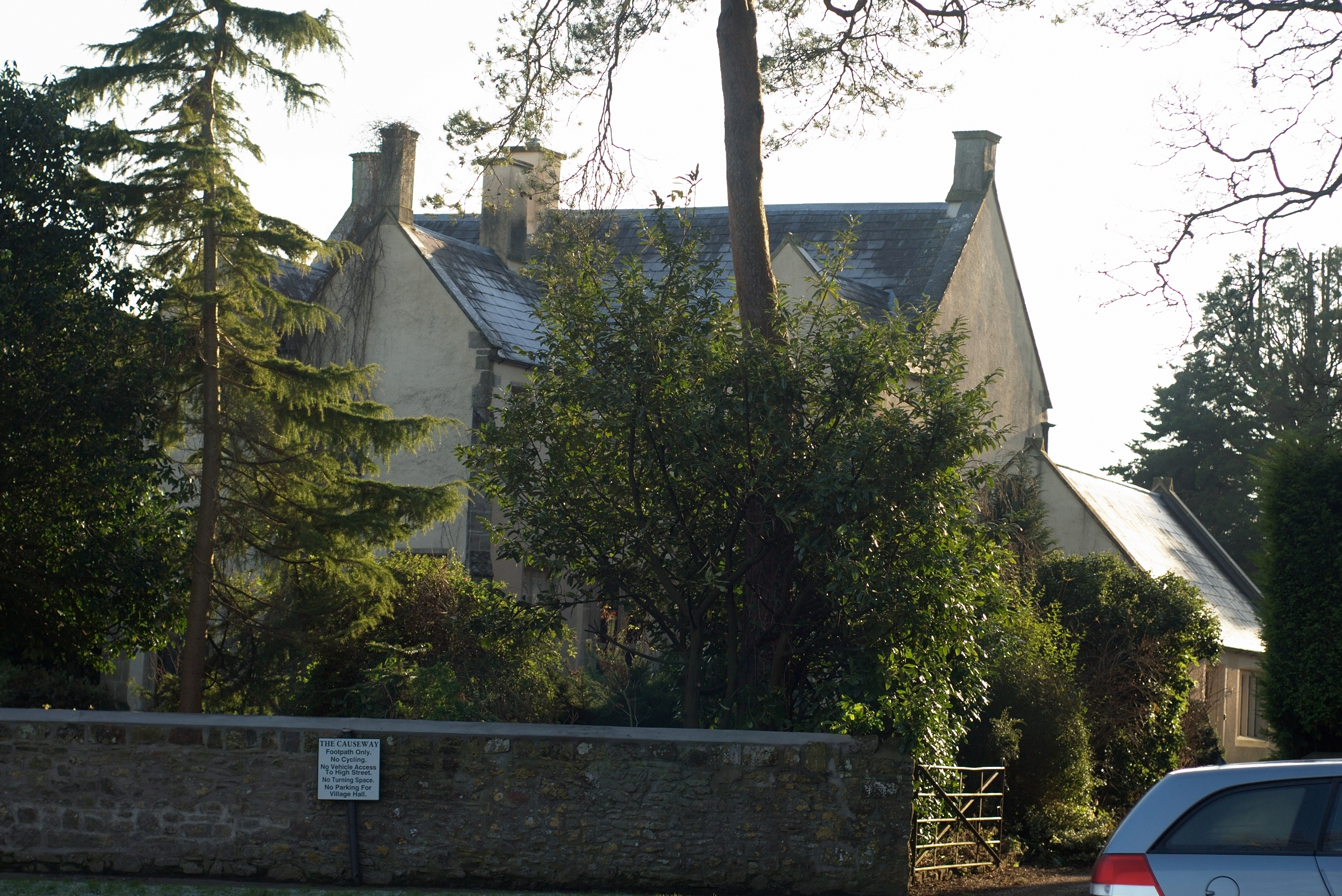
- The Old Rectory

- Location within Somerset

General information
- Location: Yatton, England
- Coordinates: 51.3849°N 2.8184°W
- Completed: 15th century

The Old Rectory in Yatton, Somerset, England, was a Prebendary house, built in the 15th century and has been designated as a Grade I listed building.

Over the years it has undergone a range of alterations including a mid 19th century rear wing. It is now separated into 2 houses which are occupied separately.

== See also ==
- List of Grade I listed buildings in North Somerset
