= Sidney Hill Cottage Homes =

Wesleyan cottage homes, Churchill, North Somerset

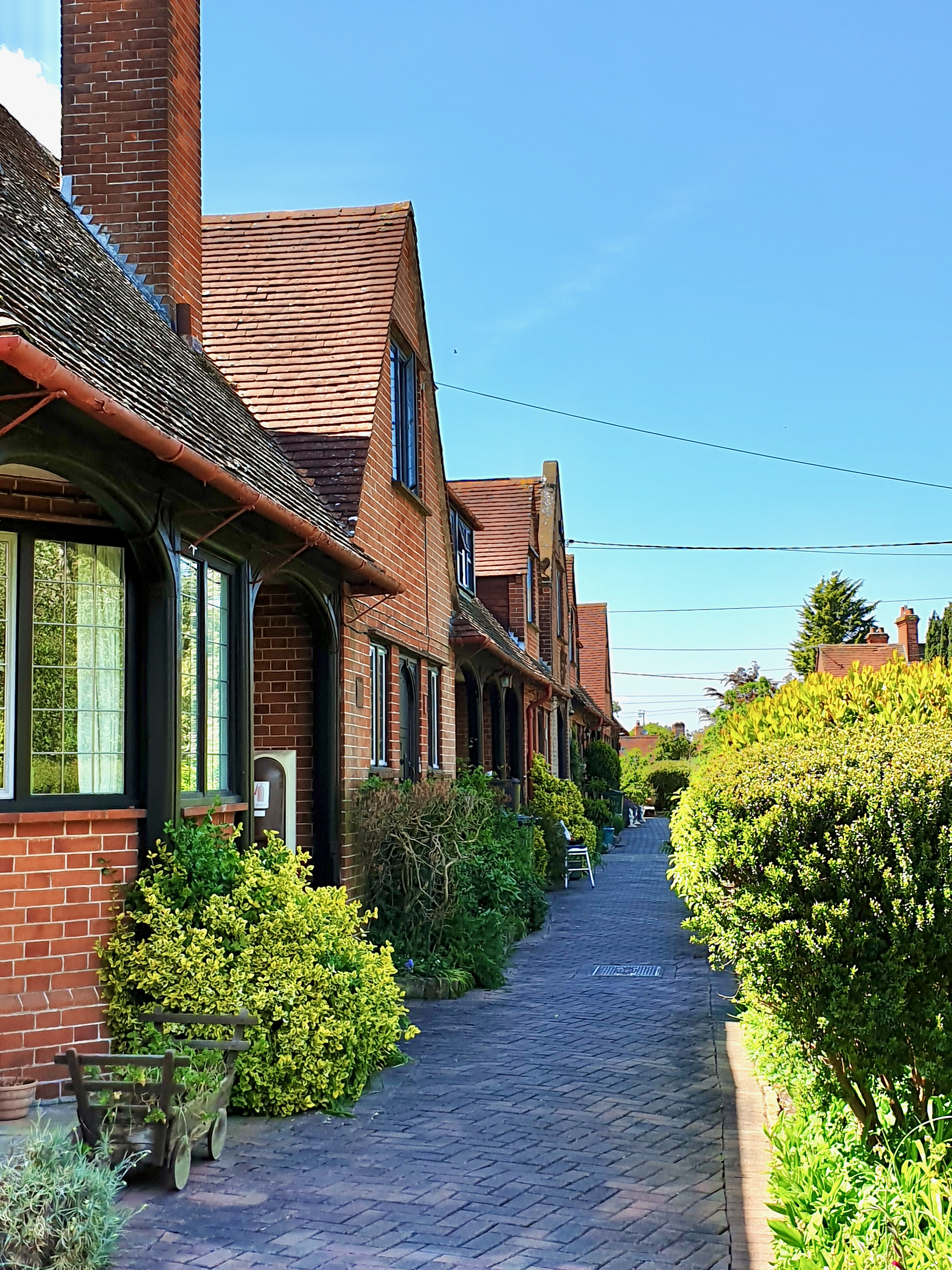
- Pathway leading to the front of the cottage homes

- Location within Somerset
- Alternative names: The Sidney Hill Churchill Wesleyan Cottage Homes

General information
- Type: Wesleyan cottage homes
- Architectural style: Arts and Crafts Vernacular style
- Location: Front Street, Churchill, North Somerset, England
- Coordinates: 51.335258°N 2.804740°W
- Construction started: 1906
- Inaugurated: December 1907 (118 years ago)
- Client: Sidney Hill
- Governing body: The Sidney Hill Churchill Wesleyan Cottage Homes

Design and construction
- Architects: Silcock and Reay of Bath and London
- Main contractor: Isaac Ford and Sons, Cheddar, Somerset, England

Listed Building – Grade II
- Official name: Sidney Hill Cottage Homes: 1129199: Homes and attached gatepiers, walls and gates; 1157960: Sundial in inner courtyard; 1320947: Matron's House
- Designated: 19 January 1987 (39 years ago)

Sidney Hill Cottage Homes, whose official name is Sidney Hill Churchill Wesleyan Cottage Homes, is a Grade II listed estate of Wesleyan cottage homes in the village of Churchill in North Somerset. It was opened in December 1907 to provide furnished accommodation for people in need. Designed in an Arts and Crafts Vernacular style by Thomas Ball Silcock and Samuel Sebastian Reay of Silcock and Reay, architects at Bath and London, twelve cottages were constructed on three sides of a quadrangle, with landscaped gardens. The third, or south side, is enclosed by a low terrace wall with wrought iron gates. A large stone sundial, with a spreading base, is set in the centre of the quadrangle. In their original form, each house had a living room, with a small scullery, larder, coal house, and one bedroom with a large storeroom.

Sidney Hill, a wealthy local businessman and benefactor, paid for the construction costs and endowed a fund to maintain the homes. Sidney Hill Churchill Wesleyan Cottage Homes, a registered charitable trust and a member of the National Association of Almshouses, continues to manage the homes and provide accommodation for local people in need. The trust also funds the maintenance of the communal garden and operates the heating system which services the houses.

== History ==
On 12 May 1904, Sidney Hill purchased at auction a plot of pasture and arable land in Churchill called "The Vicarage Close" for £500. The plot contained 2.29 hectares (5 acres 2 roods 26 perches) that consisted of three lots numbered 166, 168, and 169 on the Churchill tithe map. (Note: See chancel repair liability. The land was former glebe under the Dean and Chapter of Bristol. The Ecclesiastical Commissioners for England sold the land for the first time on 7 July 1876.) Hill's intention was to build furnished cottage homes (or almshouses) at Vicarage Close for people of advanced years, in difficult circumstances, and without near relatives. This would be Hill's second set of cottage homes after he built and furnished six dwellings known as the Victoria Jubilee Homes at Langford in commemoration of the Golden Jubilee of Queen Victoria.

The homes in Churchill were built by Isaac Ford and Sons of Cheddar, to an Arts and Crafts design by the architects Thomas Ball Silcock and Samuel Sebastian Reay of Silcock and Reay, at Bath and London. Sidney Hill and Silcock were political allies: Hill was a vice-president of the Liberal Association in Wells and nominated Silcock as the Liberal candidate for the 1906 General Election. Silcock and Reay's coloured drawing of the homes was sufficiently well-regarded to be included in the 1906 and 1907 Royal Academy Exhibitions. (Note: See exhibit 1570, "The Churchill Homes, Somerset: Front view. Silcock and Reay" in the 1907 catalogue.)

The cost of the buildings, exclusive of the cost of land, amounted to £11,000 (equivalent to £1,144,000 in 2025), and the furniture in the homes, the trustees' room, and the matron's cottage, amounted to a further £1,915. The gardens and planting cost an additional £900. The homes bear the inscription "The Sidney Hill Churchill Wesleyan Cottage Homes" and were opened in December 1907. The first residents were chosen personally by Sidney Hill with preference given to followers of the Wesleyan movement. Robert Stone, a blacksmith at the forge opposite the homes, had a cottage where the homes were built. The cottage was demolished during construction, and he and his wife became the first family to enter the homes. Each occupant of the homes was given a sufficient weekly sum for maintenance. (Note: The founding deed stated that the private income of any occupant was not to exceed £50 per year.)

On 13 January 1908, John Durban Loveless, Sidney Hill's agent, (Note: Loveless was an agent and steward for Sidney Hill and a lay preacher in Wesleyan churches in the North Mendip area.) was presented with an illuminated address and silver salver by Silcock and Reay in recognition of his efforts to complete the home. The presentation was made by Silcock, then the Liberal MP for the Wells Division of Somerset, and the address was designed and illuminated by Reay. The land and buildings were gifted to the Sidney Hill Churchill Wesleyan Cottage Homes trust in October 1906. After the death of Sidney Hill in 1908, and four years after the death of his nephew who had succeeded him, Thomas Sidney Hill, his great nephew took over as chair of the trust. Since that time various other local people have been nominated to the board of trustees including, up until this day, many direct descendants of the Hill family.

In 1958, the trust became a member of the National Association of Almshouses, and in January 1962, a registered charitable trust. The occupants were not asked to make a residential contribution until 1972, and since that time, there have been annual increases; now a contribution is made which is comparable with modern rented accommodation. The trust funds the maintenance of the communal garden and operates the heating system which services the houses.

== Architecture ==
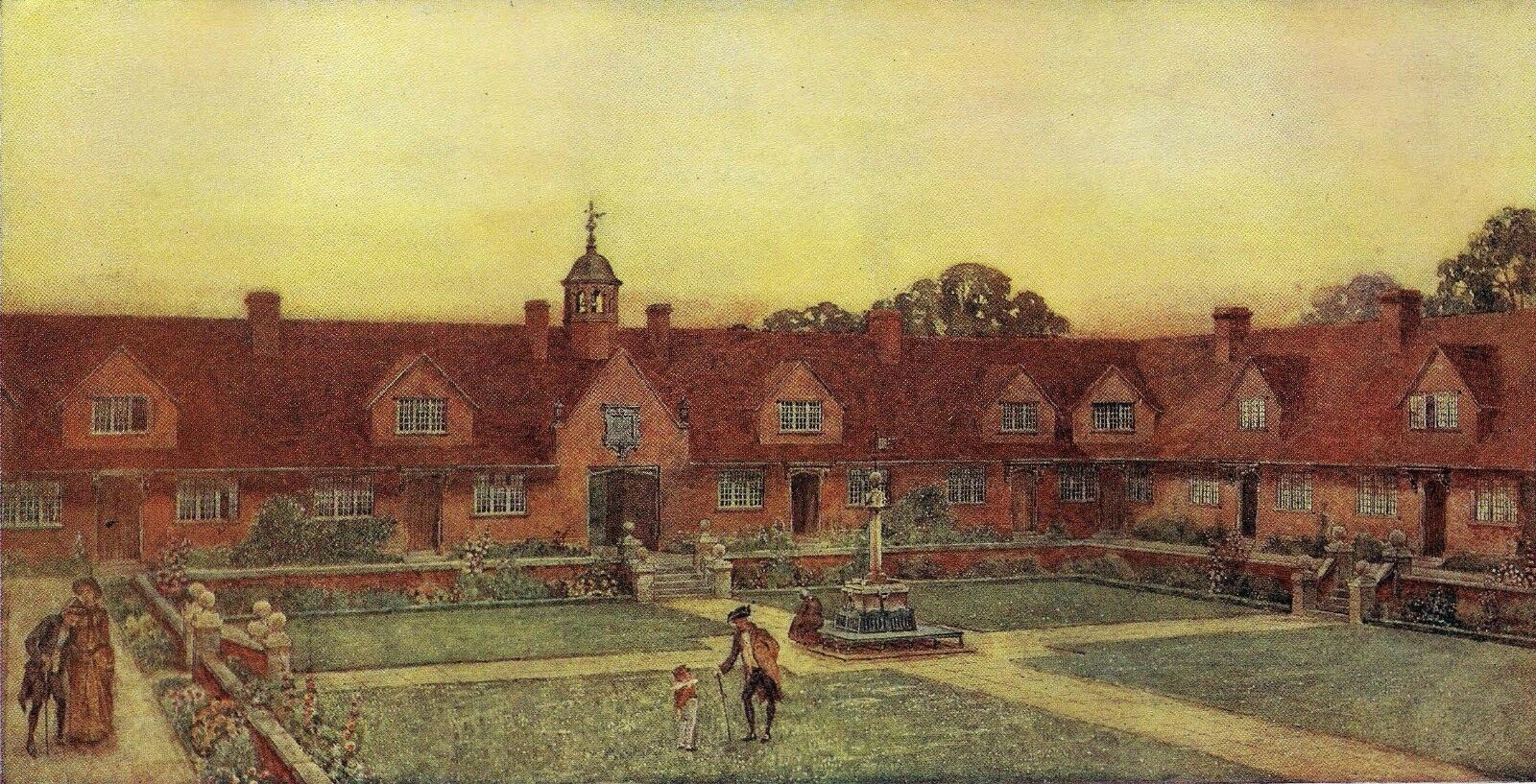
Illustration of Sidney Hill Cottage Homes by Thomas Raffles Davison (1907)

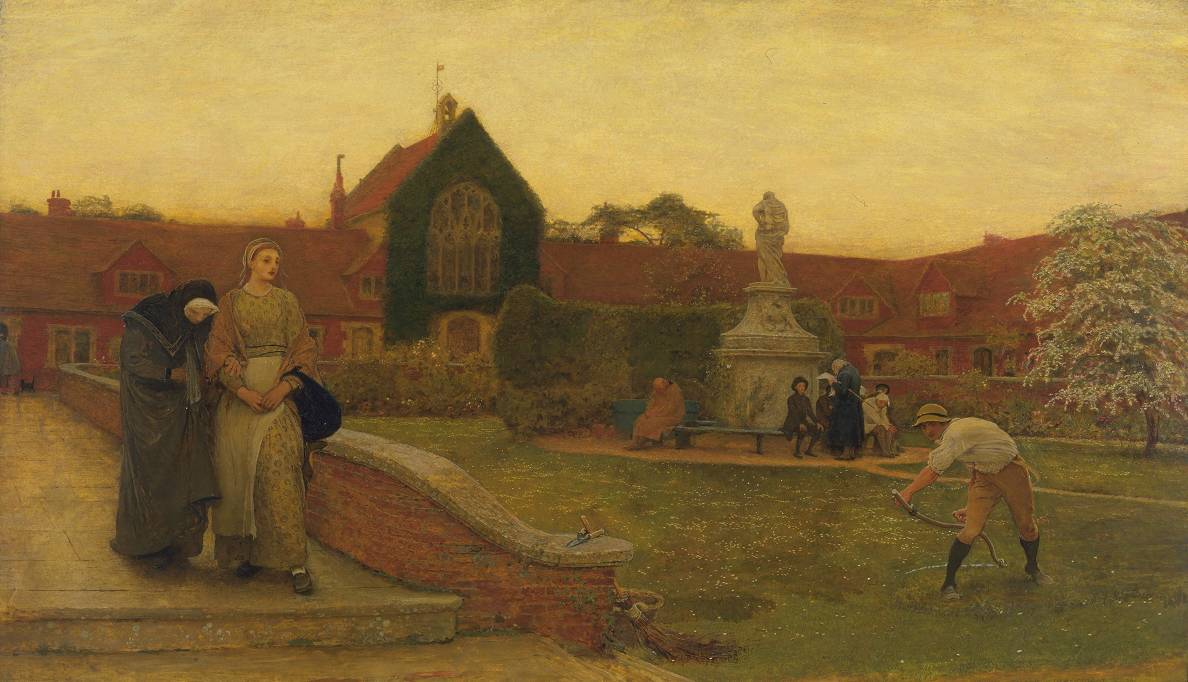
The Harbour of Refuge by Frederick Walker (1872)

Silcock and Reay were said to have been inspired by the painting "Harbour of Refuge", painted by Frederick Walker in 1872, and now in the Tate Gallery.

The houses stand on land containing 0.61 hectares (1.5 acres), elevated about 1.5 metres (5 feet) above Front Street in Churchill, with a field of 1.6 hectares (4 acres) south of the main buildings and reserved in perpetuity as an open space. (Note: However, see rule against perpetuities.) They are arranged on three sides of a quadrangle about 37 metres (120 feet) square, its open side facing south with a view to woods on the Mendip Hills. The south side is enclosed by a low brick terrace wall coped with stone and ornamented with carved stone vases, and in the centre is a gateway with wrought iron gates giving access to working gardens. Wide stone-paved paths run round the four sides of the quadrangle, the south path is terminated at each end with a large arbour arranged under the main roof, which is supported by oak posts and balustrades, each arbour contained oak seats and tables.

A low, brick parapet wall encloses the quadrangle, with stone steps leading down to the lawn and flower borders; these are sunk some 0.76 metres (2.5 feet) below the level of the stone paved paths, and in the centre is a large stone sundial (see §Sundial). The front of the building faces Front Street in Churchill, and is set back from the road by a courtyard that has lawns and paths with flower borders and trees. A terrace wall of brick with large stone vases separates the courtyard from the road. The courtyard is approached by steps through entrance gates made of wrought iron with a bell turret and weather vane over the central archway.

The north, east, and west sides of the houses have gables and recessed arbours that have arches supported by oak posts. (Note: See Courtyard with an Arbour for architectural influences.) The doorways are constructed from arched oak frames and doors; the doors in the quadrangle have moulded hoods supported by carved corbels. The walls are of sand-faced brick, with handmade red roof tiles, oak window frames with iron casements and lead window glazing. The stone used for the copings, piers and finials is Cotswold stone, a yellow, oolitic Jurassic limestone, that was mined at Temple Guiting quarry, in Gloucestershire, England. It was chosen as its colour would harmonise with the warm tones of the walls and roofs.

In the original design, each house had a living room, with a small scullery, larder, coal house, and a bedroom with a large storeroom. Over the entrance to the quadrangle is a large meeting room, reached by a spiral stone staircase. The room is panelled to a height of 2.1 metres (7 feet), with windows at each end, on which are the coat of arms of Sidney Hill. (Note: The meeting room is used by the trustees of The Sidney Hill Churchill Wesleyan Cottage Homes charity.) The room also has a stone fireplace with Hill's motto inscribed on the mantelpiece. (Note: See §Sundial for Hill's coat of arms and motto.) The living rooms in the homes had fireplaces set in golden brown bricks with raised hearths of the same material. The bedroom fireplaces had green tile surrounds and tiled hearths, and all the fireplaces had simple oak mantels. A fire guard was provided for each living room, and bells enabled each house to communicate with the others in case of emergency. (Note: The heating system has now been replaced by a central, oil fired system which services all the houses.) The homes were furnished with oak furniture designed by Silcock and Reay. In the south west corner of the site a small laundry was built together with outbuildings.

A matron's house was built in the north west corner of the site, adjoining Front Street, containing two sitting rooms, a kitchen, three bedrooms, and a bathroom. The matron's house is listed as a Grade II building by Historic England separately from the other buildings on the site. It is one storey building, with a (now converted) attic, constructed from red brick with a plain tiled roof. The windows have three wooden casements with small leaded panes; those to the attic are under gables. There are two Tudor arched doorways with plank doors to south and east fronts. There is a wooden round arched loggia to the east front and a gabled porch to the south front.

== Sundial ==
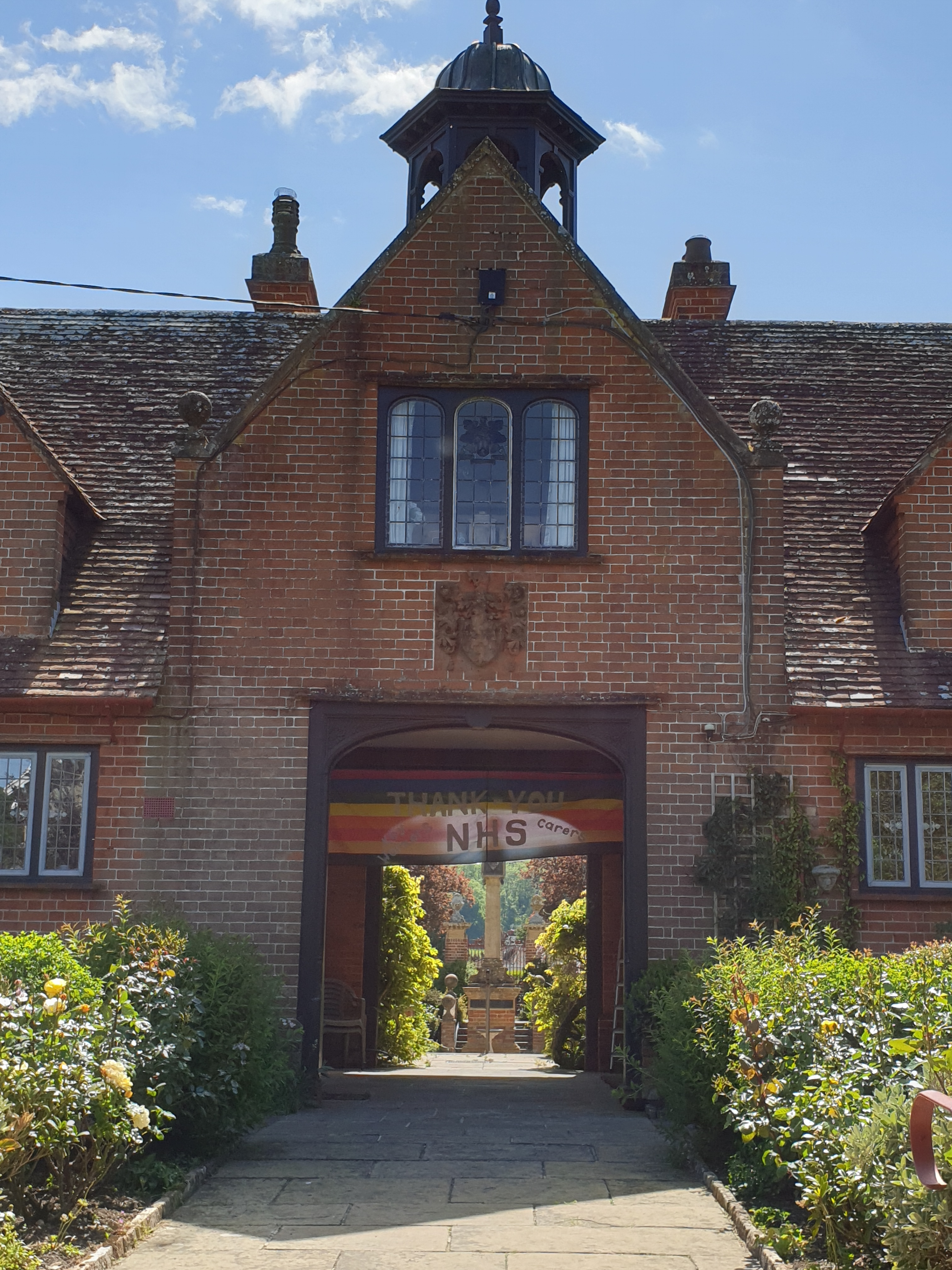
The central archway towards the quadrangle and the sundial. Sidney Hill's coat of arms is shown over the archway.

A large stone sundial, designed by Silcock and Reay, stands on a base of brick in the centre of the quadrangle, and is listed separately as a Grade II monument by Historic England. It has a limestone mid course and cornice, and a hexagonal stone shaft 4.5 metres (15 feet) metres high, developing from four consoles that have decorative features in lead. A square sundial, with four bronze plates and a ball finial, are affixed to the top of the shaft. John Parish White and Sons of The Pyghtle Works, Bedford, supplied the sundial, decorative lead, stonework and plates. The same company supplied the oak benches that surrounded the base when it was first erected. (Note: John Parish White established the Pyghtle Works, Bedford, in 1896, where he produced an extensive range of garden statues, vases, sundials, and fountains.)

There are also four brass bronze plates attached around the base of the sundial that inscribe a quatrain of John Greenleaf Whittier, called "Inscription on a Sun-Dial for Dr. Henry I. Bowditch". Whittier wrote the quatrain originally as an inscription for a sundial plate owned by Dr. Henry Ingersoll Bowditch: (Note: See Bowditch 1902, p. 246, Chapter 12. "Life at Weston: The Whittier Sundial", for an illustration of the sundial plate owned by Henry Ingersoll Bowditch.)

With warning hand I mark Time's rapid flight
From Life's glad morning to its solemn night;
Yet, through the dear God's love, I also show
There's Light above me by the shade below.

== Architectural importance ==
There is no overarching architectural style within Churchill. However, the Sidney Hill Cottage Homes is unique within the village, with its ornate brick work, ironwork railings and lampposts, large concrete urns, bell tower and weather vane, and in the central courtyard, the sundial. In particular, the gate piers with their carved stone vases and wrought iron gates are an exciting testimony to late Victorian architecture. In contrast, the predominant construction material in the larger, detached Georgian buildings is local stone, interspersed with much older, more traditional cottages, and post-war, detached bungalows and houses. There are a few other structures with distinctive brickwork features in the area that include the Jubilee Clock Tower and Methodist church. (Note: It is notable that the clock tower and Methodist church were commissioned by Sidney Hill. Foster and Wood, Bristol, were the architects for these two buildings, and were known for their Gothic style. See Philanthropic works of Sidney Hill for more information.)

== Gallery ==
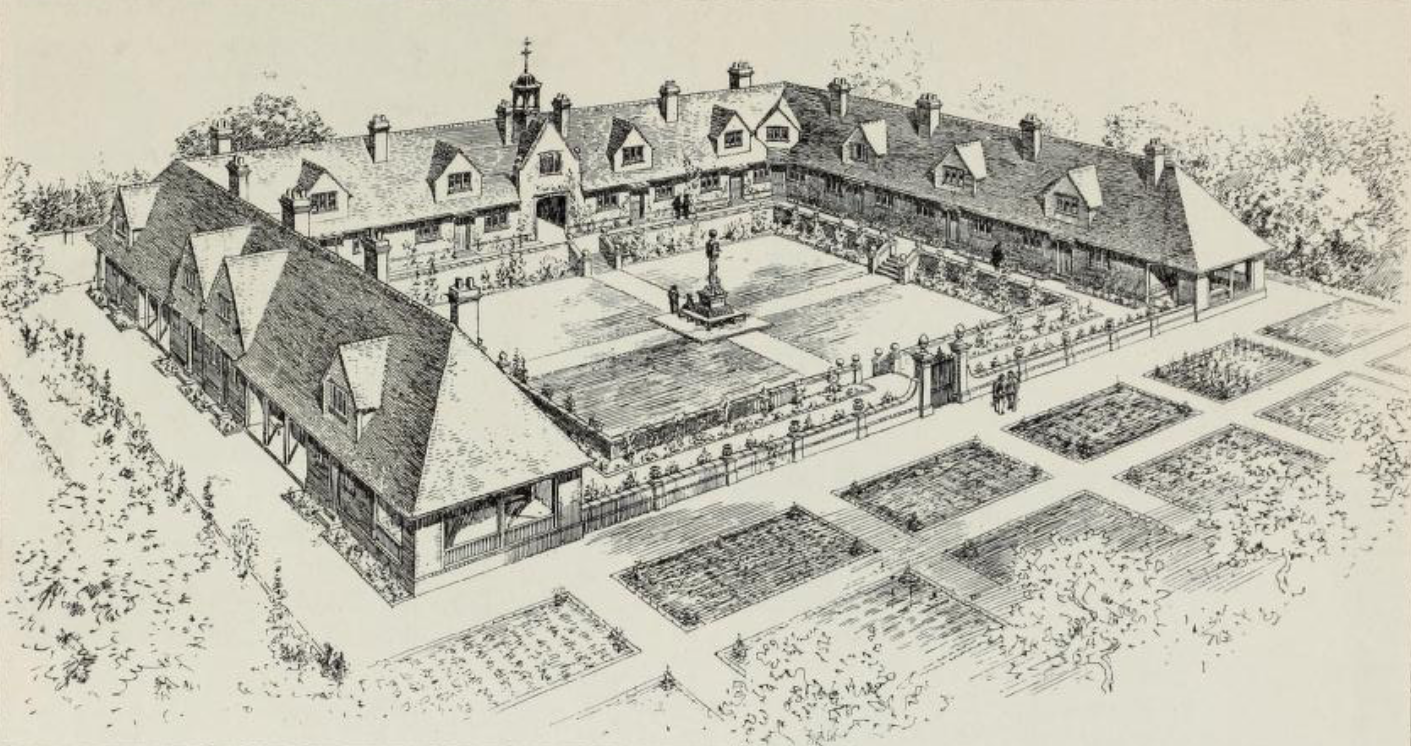
Illustration of Sidney Hill Cottage Homes by Thomas Raffles Davison in 1909

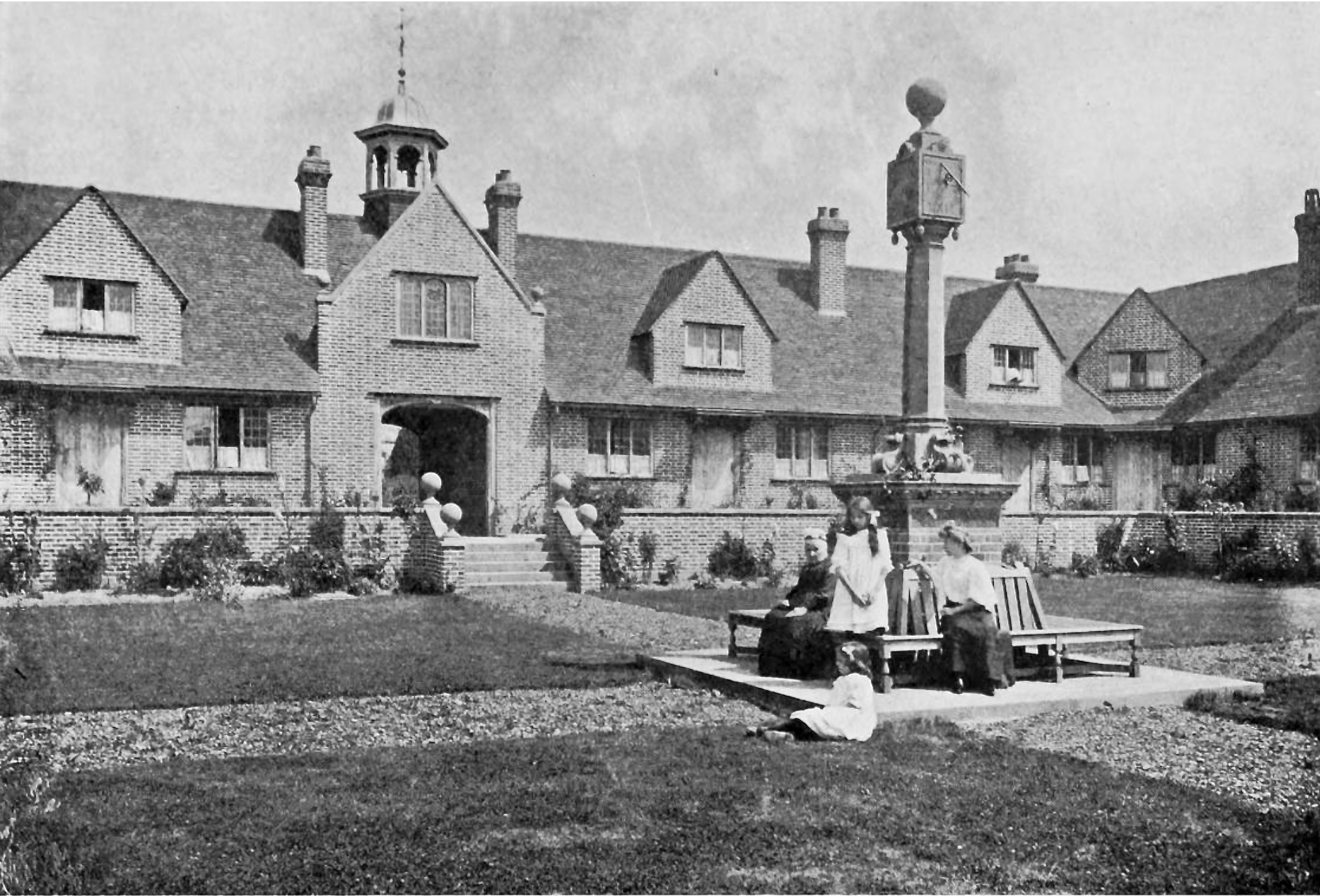
The quadrangle at Sidney Hill Cottage Homes looking towards the central archway and sundial

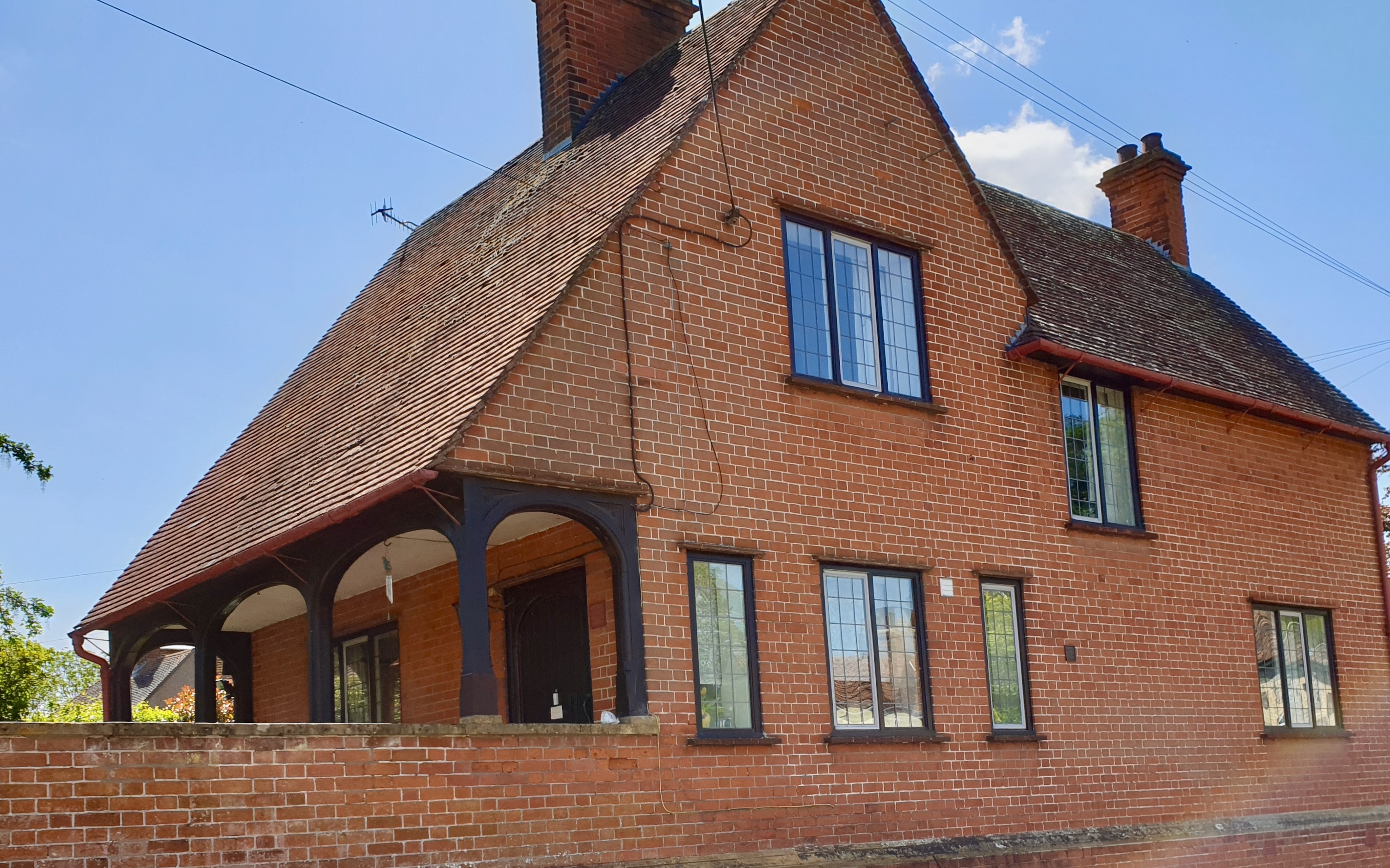
The Matron's house at Sidney Hill Cottage Homes

== See also ==
- Almshouse
- Churchill, Somerset
- Sidney Hill
- Sundial
