= 1960s decor =

Style of interior decoration

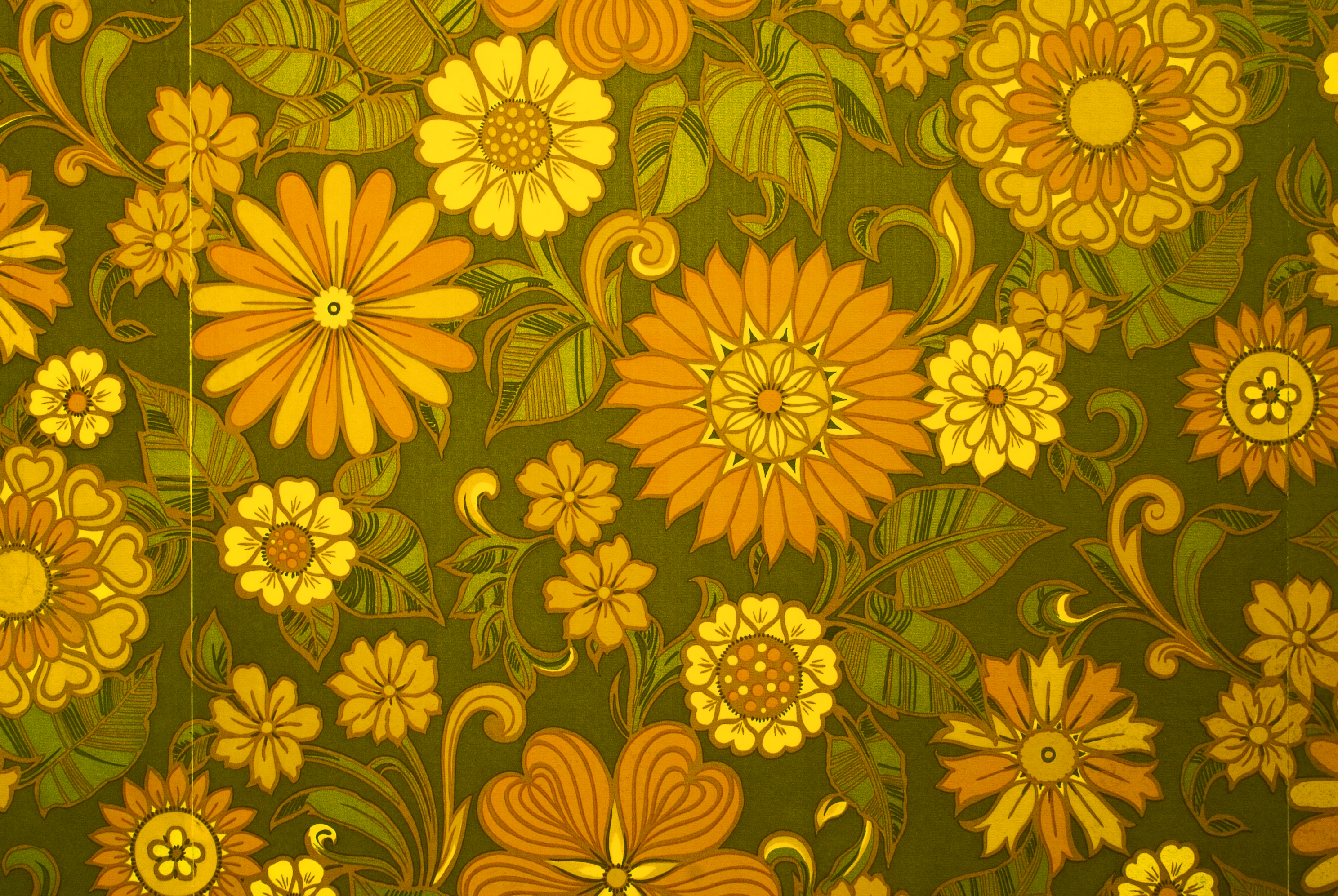
A typical example of 1960s wallpaper. Note the pea green and saffron colours and the flowery psychedelic design, common during this period.

1960s décor refers to a distinct style of interior decoration that became prominent in the 1960s and early 1970s. Green (such as pea green and drab), yellow, pink, and orange (such as peach and saffron) hues were popular for wallpaper, carpets, curtains, sofas, chair seats, and cushions, often with patterns or bright flowers. English decorator David Hicks was an important influence on interiors in the 1960s, inspired by bright colours associated with India. Hicks popularized the use of "psychedelic patterns and acid-edged colors," peaking from 1967 to 1973, a time when there was interest in the hippie movement and "flower power." In the same era, Dorothy Draper, one of Manhattan's top interior decorators of the 1960s, used 'dull' white and 'shiny' black as one of her favorite combinations.

The "Retro Modern" style is associated with the decades of the 1950s and 1960s. As a furniture material, polypropylene, which was manufactured in colors that could be matched to paint chips, came into its own. Foam molding, mostly used as upholstery cushions, became a basic structural unit for furniture in the early 1960s. Large areas, such as sofas, beds, carpets, drapes and wallcovers, were covered in vibrant colors and patterns. Employing "psychedelic intensity", the colors and styles were influenced by India, Spain, and the Mediterranean.

In the 1950s and 1960s, specialized patterns in wall painting were developed. Sherwin-Williams manufactured an applique system, and similar systems were manufactured by Karl Höhn, also Reuss, in Germany.

Many hotels and restaurants retain their décor from the 1960s or specifically employ sixties-style features to give them a more nostalgic sensibility. Pink or orange paintwork, bedspreads, and curtains, which were fashionable in the 1960s, however, were considered by some to be "hideous" or "painful" by the early 2000s. As Paul Evans put it, "For many the popular image of 1960s home design was of ephemerality and excess, of plastic or paper chairs and lurid carpets and wallpaper." By the 2020s, however, many of these previously-loathed styles and colors came back into fashion with movements such as cottagecore, spread on social media platforms such as TikTok.

Television series from the era, such as The Avengers, Batman, The Man from U.N.C.L.E., Bewitched, The Saint, and Randall and Hopkirk (Deceased), provide fine examples of the type of décor popular during this period and are an important aspect of the look of the productions; for the latter, orange hues are included in the title design.

== List of major contributing designers ==
- Verner Panton
- Charles and Ray Eames
- Eero Saarinen
- Peter Max
- Alexander Girard
- Maija Isola
- David Hicks
- Celia Birtwell
- Hans Krondahl
- Lily Goddard
- Andy Warhol
- Vuokko Nurmesniemi
- Lucienne Day
- Jack Lenor Larsen
- Bernat Klein
- Dorothy Liebes
- Franco Scalamandré
- Marianne Straub
- Terence Conran
- Mary White
- Bob Hieronimus
- Wes Wilson
