= Mary White =

Mary White may refer to:

== People ==
- Mary White (ceramicist and calligrapher) (1926–2013), UK and Germany
- Mary White (classicist) (1908–1977), Canadian classicist and university professor
- Mary White (designer) (1912–1981), Australian designer and crafts adviser
- Mary White (Fianna Fáil politician) (1944–2026), Irish Fianna Fáil party politician
- Mary White (Green Party politician) (born 1948), Irish Green Party politician
- Mary White (physician) (1925–2017), English physician
- Mary White (textile designer) (1930–2020), English textile designer
- Mary Anne White (born 1953), Canadian materials scientist
- Mary Daisy White (1873–1958), American politician and business owner
- Mary deLuce White (c. 1876–1960), American stage actress better known as Mary Hall
- Mary E. White (1926–2018), Australian paleobotanist
- Mary Jarrett White, the first woman to vote in the state of Georgia
- Mary Jo White (born 1947), attorney for the Southern District of New York
- Mary Jo White (Pennsylvania politician) (1941–2025), member of the Pennsylvania State Senate
- Mary Louisa White (1866–1935), British composer, pianist, and educator
- Mary White Rowlandson (c. 1637–1711), colonial American woman writer of a captivity narrative
- G.C. Mary White (died 1944), Canadian journalist known as Bride Broder
- Mary White Scott (1897–1972), née White, American teacher, farmer, and First Lady of North Carolina
- Mary White (1905–1921), daughter of newspaper editor William Allen White, subject of the 1977 film
- Mary White, former Australian national netball captain

== Ships ==
- Mary White (lifeboat), a lifeboat based in Broadstairs, Kent, England
- Mary White (trawler), a steam trawler built in Aberdeen, Scotland

== Others ==
- Mary White (film), a 1977 TV movie

== See also ==
- Mary Whyte (born 1953), American watercolor artist
