= Sidney Hill =

British merchant and philanthropist (1829–1908)

- Hill riding his horse — circa 1890s
- Born: Simon Sidney Hill; 1 October 1829; Berkeley Place, Clifton, Bristol, England
- Died: 3 March 1908 (aged 78); Langford House, Lower Langford, North Somerset, England
- Occupations: Merchant; gentleman farmer; justice of the peace
- Spouse: Mary Ann Bobbett (m. 1864; died 1874)

Simon Sidney Hill (1 October 1829 – 3 March 1908) was an English philanthropist, merchant, gentleman farmer, and justice of the peace. From beginnings as a linen merchant, he made his fortune as a colonial and general merchant trading from South Africa. He supported and endowed almshouses in Churchill and Lower Langford, and manses for Methodist clergy at Banwell and Cheddar. He founded Methodist churches at Port Elizabeth, Sandford, Shipham and Blagdon besides the Wesley Methodist church and school at Churchill. Many of his charitable foundations still survive.

== Early life ==
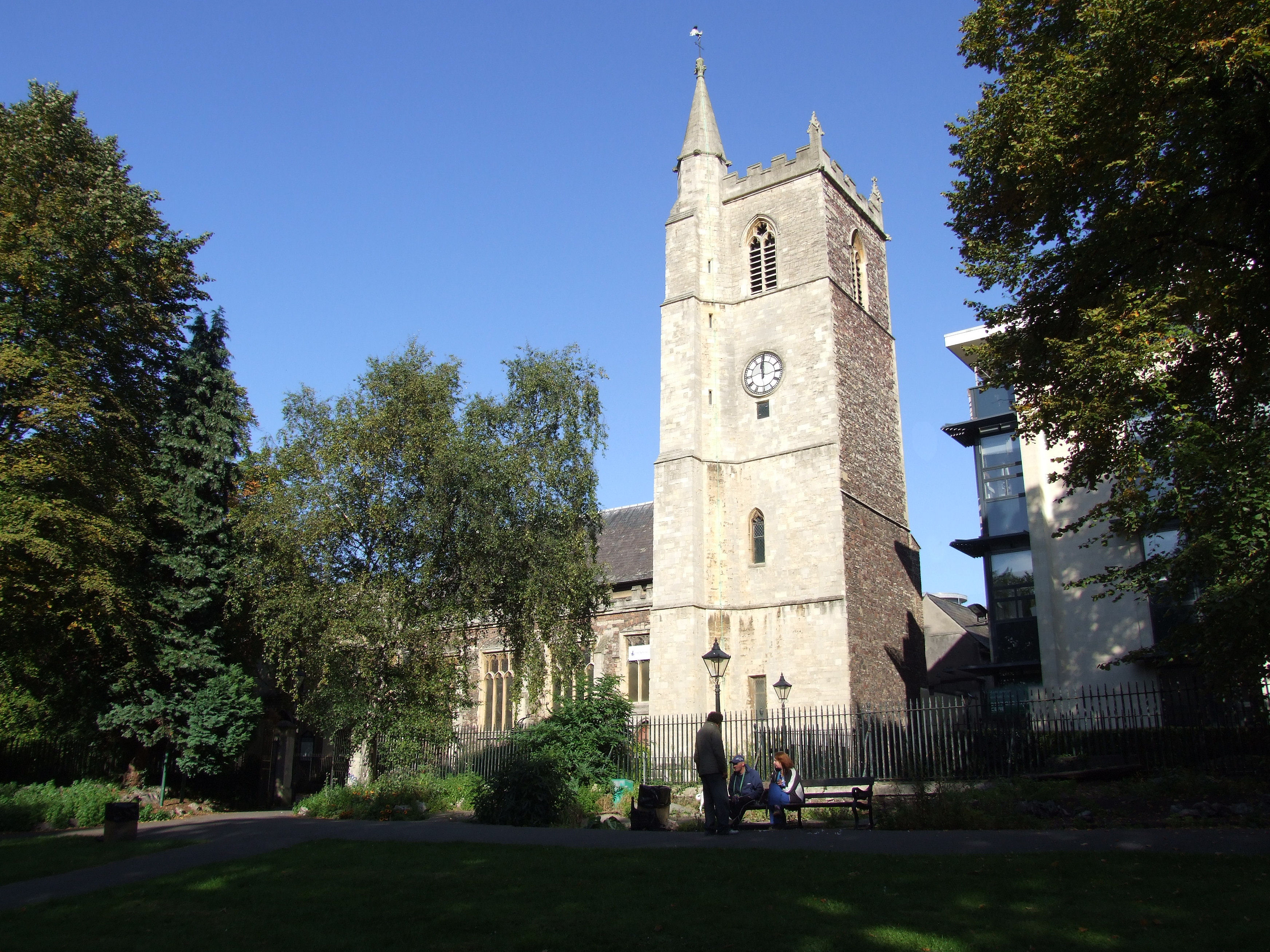
St James' Priory, Bristol, where Hill was baptised

Hill was born on 1 October 1829 at Berkeley Place in Clifton, Bristol, and was baptised at St James' Priory, Bristol, on 1 November 1829. He was the sixth and youngest son of Thomas Hill (1778–1846), a former master sweep and soot merchant, and Elizabeth (1783–1857), née James. (Note: He styled himself as Sidney Hill and was commonly known by that name in later life.)

His father was apprenticed as a climbing boy from the age of eight, serving from 1787 to 1798, before joining the Royal Marines at Devonport, Plymouth. He left the navy after four years, returned to sweeping, but left it again to earn a living as a labourer in Devonport Dockyard. He returned to sweeping again in 1811 and followed it until his retirement. He was also a foreman to the Clifton Norwich Union Fire Insurance Office for twelve years, until one of his other sons took over the role. (Note: Amongst other duties, a foreman would supervise house and chimney fire extinguishment.) Thomas died on 7 October 1846 (aged 68) when Sidney was just seventeen years old. (Note: Thomas Hill died at his home in Berkeley Place, Clifton, and was buried at St Andrew's Church, Clifton, on 14 October 1846.)

Hill was educated at Portway House boarding school, located between Victoria Park and Partis College, in Weston, Bath. In September 1847, Sidney joined Sunday Methodist society classes, led by William Bobbett, at the Old Market Street chapel in Bristol, where he converted to Methodism. Hill would later dedicate Shipham Methodist Chapel to the memory of William. (Note: Thomas Francis Christopher May attended the same classes as Hill and became a life-long friend. He was later a senior partner of May and Hassall, timber merchants, in the Cumberland Basin, Bristol. He died on 9 August 1905 (aged 74) and the Blagdon Methodist Memorial Chapel and School Room was later dedicated to him.)

== Life as a merchant ==
=== Early years ===
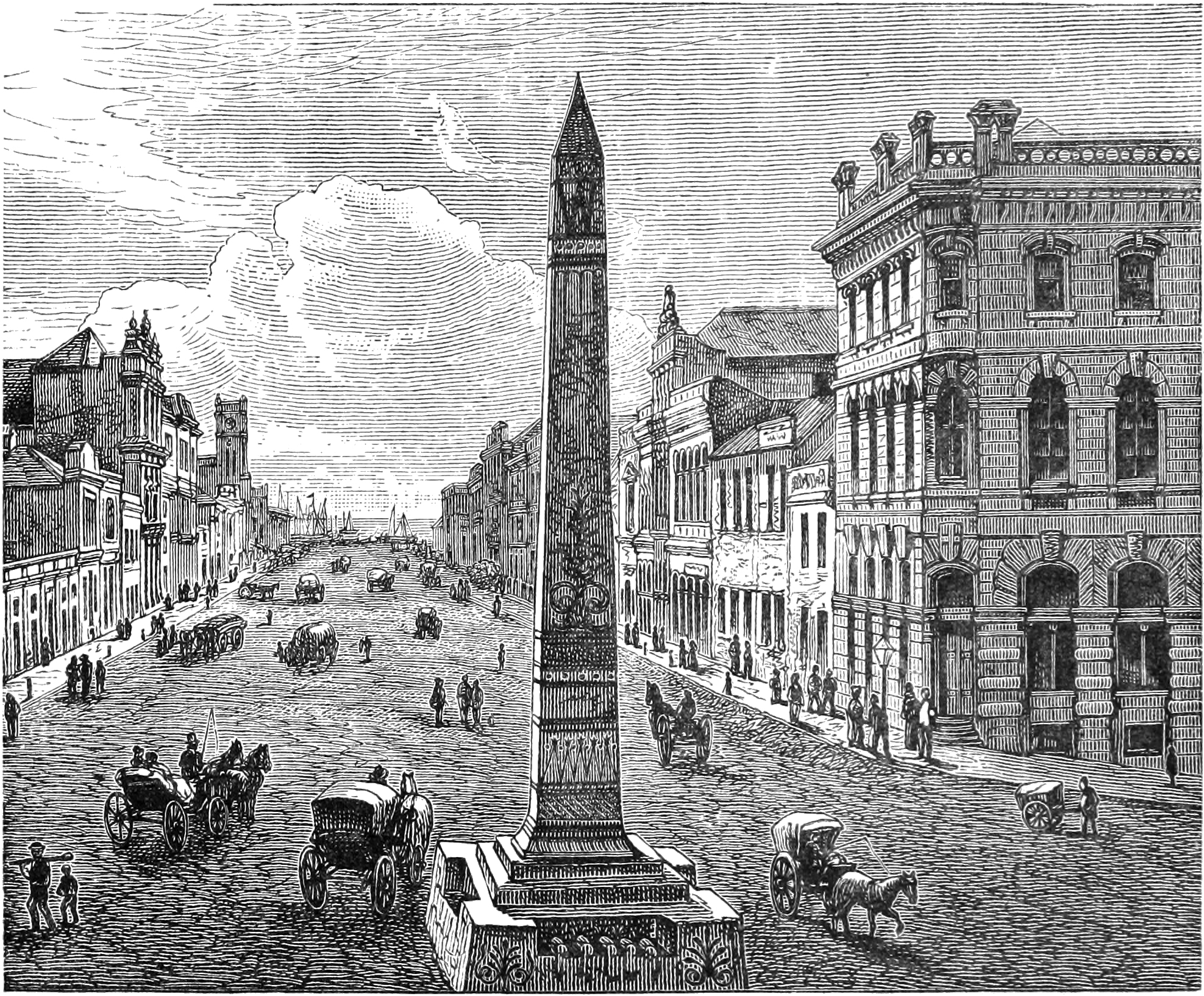
Main Street in Port Elizabeth where Savage & Hill had premises

Described as a delicate boy, Hill did not follow in his father's soot business, although two of his brothers did. When he came of age, he inherited money from his father's estate that he used to open a small linen draper shop at Berkeley Place, Clifton. (Note: Sidney inherited a considerable sum of money and his father's gold watch. Master sweeps could become relatively wealthy if they were able to agree contracts to sweep large estates and public buildings.) The business grew and he moved to larger premises at 7 Byron Place, Lower Berkeley Place, Clifton. However, by 1856 he was not in good health and his doctor advised him to travel to a country with a warmer climate. Hill sold the drapery business and embarked on a sea voyage to New Zealand, but when the ship berthed at Algoa Bay in Port Elizabeth, South Africa, he decided to remain there. The first letter he received there informed him of the death of his mother on 31 March 1857 (aged 73), which left him bereaved. (Note: Elizabeth Hill died at Byron Place, Clifton, Bristol, and was buried at St Andrew's Church, Clifton, on 7 April 1857.)

In 1857, Hill opened a dry goods store at Port Elizabeth, and in 1859, went into partnership with William Savage. Savage was the son of a former paper maker and stationer in Lewes, East Sussex. He had arrived in Port Elizabeth around 1849 and started a business selling stationery and hardware. Their partnership, Savage & Hill, Colonial and General Merchants, began trading commodities from 95 and 97 Main Street (southern side) in Port Elizabeth. They traded in anything from household hardware, refined sugar, ammunition, minerals, to ostrich feathers for the fashion trade and haberdashery industry. (Note: Ostrich feathers were in great demand from the Victorian millinery industry and haberdashers.) The bulk of their trade was transacted from Port Elizabeth, but as the business prospered, branches were opened in the principal towns of the Cape Colony and in the Colony of Natal.

=== Marriage ===
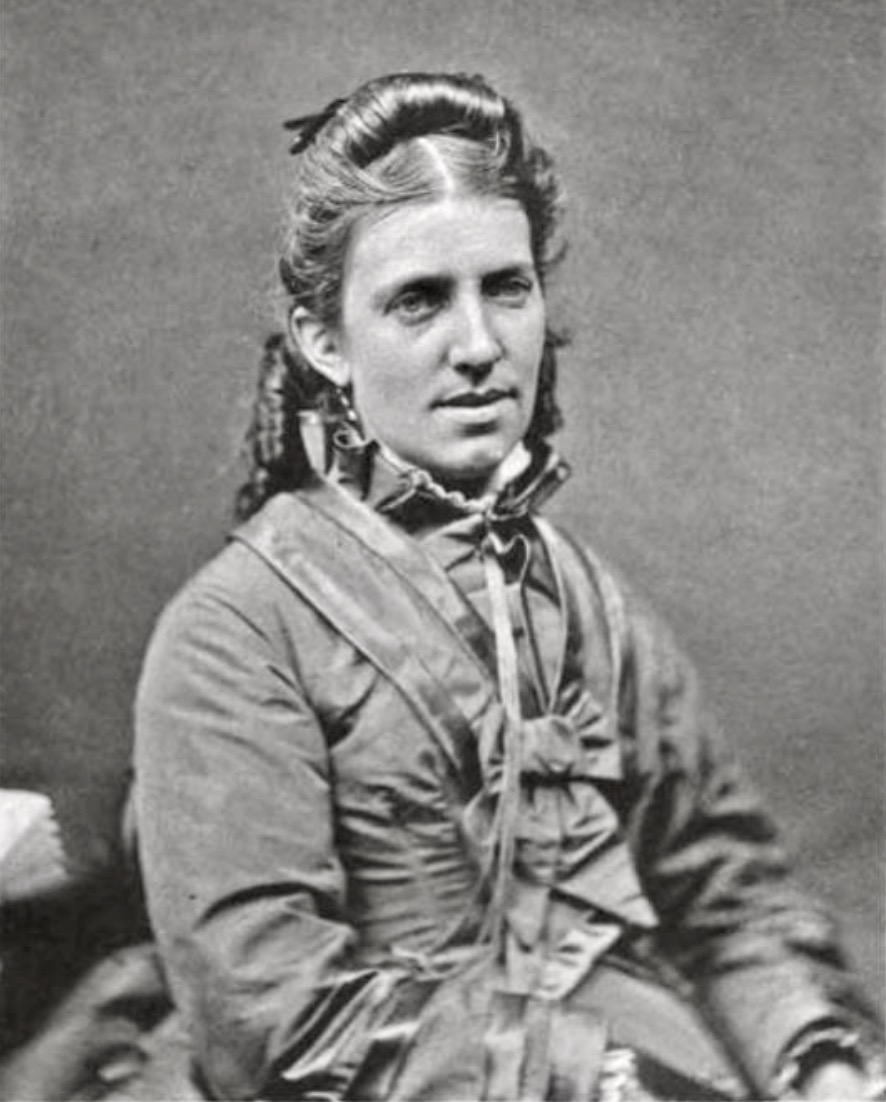
Hill married Mary Ann Bobbett in 1864.

In 1864, Hill returned to London to direct the firm's large shipping interests from their offices at 41 Bow Lane, Cheapside, London, moving later to offices at 6 and 42 Palmerston Buildings in Bishopsgate Street. On 15 June 1864, he married Mary Ann Bobbett at the Wesleyan chapel, Churchill, North Somerset. The Reverend William Shaw Caldecott was Hill's best man, and later, the author of Mary Ann Hill's memorial sketch (1875). (Note: Edgar Wallace married Ivy Maud Caldecott, the third daughter of Reverend Caldecott, and in his autobiography, described Caldecott as "a bearded giant of a man, an autocrat of autocrats, a brilliant scholar and the author of books on the Temples of Ezekiel and Solomon.")

Bobbett was born on 6 March 1839, the eldest daughter of John Winter and Frances Bobbett. John Winter Bobbett was a baker and corn and flour dealer, in partnership with his brother, and Hill's close friend, William Bobbett, at W. and J. W. Bobbett, on West Street, Old Market, Bristol. In 1849, Bobbett was sent to school; first to the Quaker Friends' Boarding School at Sidcot, near the village of Winscombe, North Somerset, and then to a finishing school, the Quaker Mount School in York. She was away from home for five years, and when she returned to Bristol, she became a housekeeper for her uncle, William Bobbett, at West Street, Bristol.

Hill had met her before their marriage, when he had been invited to Sunday tea at Bristol, and then at Sidney Villa in Dinghurst, Churchill, (Note: 51.333108°N 2.803435°W. Close to the old Methodist chapel in Churchill and opposite The Drive, Dinghurst. It was renamed Bay Tree House when the Millward family purchased the house from the Richard Stuart Turner Westlake estate in 1984.) after William Bobbett had moved there in 1859, following his retirement on 2 July 1859. Bobbett and Hill shared a staunch belief in the work of the Wesleyan Methodist Church, and this would influence much of their life, particularly Hill's later years after he purchased the Langford estate.

=== Life in South Africa ===
The Hills spent six months in London before Sidney's business took them back to South Africa, departing England on 10 February 1865 for a month long voyage to Port Elizabeth. Savage & Hill prospered after the growth of trade at Port Elizabeth following the discovery of diamonds at Griqualand West in 1870, and the subsequent completion of the railway to Kimberley, Northern Cape, in 1873. (Note: In one year, Hill would report a net profit of £60,000.) With the rapid expansion of the Cape Colony's railway network to the interior over the following years, the harbour of Port Elizabeth became the focus for serving import and export needs of a large area of the Cape's hinterland. The rapid economic development around the port, which followed the railway construction, caused Port Elizabeth to be nicknamed "the Liverpool of South Africa", after the major British city and port.

A very intelligent, thorough businessman, a zealous Wesleyan Christian.

— William Taylor, Bishop of the Methodist Episcopal Church for Africa, after meeting Hill at his home in Port Elizabeth on 21 April 1866.

Despite being engaged in an expanding business, Hill found time for furthering the work of the Wesleyan Methodist church at Port Elizabeth, occupying the offices of superintendent of the Sunday school, class leader, and chapel and circuit steward. In April 1870, Hill gave £550 (equivalent to £56,600 in 2025) towards the construction of the original Wesleyan Methodist chapel at Russell Road, Port Elizabeth. (Note: See Port Elizabeth Methodist chapel under §Philanthropic works.)

=== Death of Mary Ann Hill ===
Around 1870, Mary Ann Hill was diagnosed with tuberculosis in her left lung. With her health failing, the Hills left South Africa for England on 8 April 1874. They decided to winter in Bournemouth due to the mild climate there, but after only five weeks' residence, Mary Ann died in the evening of 7 December 1874. She was buried at Arnos Vale Cemetery in Bristol. In 1881, her remains were removed from Arnos Vale and reinterred at the Wesleyan Methodist church, Churchill, that was built in her memory in 1880. (Note: Mary Ann Hill's younger brother, and John Winter Bobbett's third son, Walter, died within weeks of her death, on 22 December 1874, having also returned recently from South Africa.)

== Later life ==
=== Return to England ===
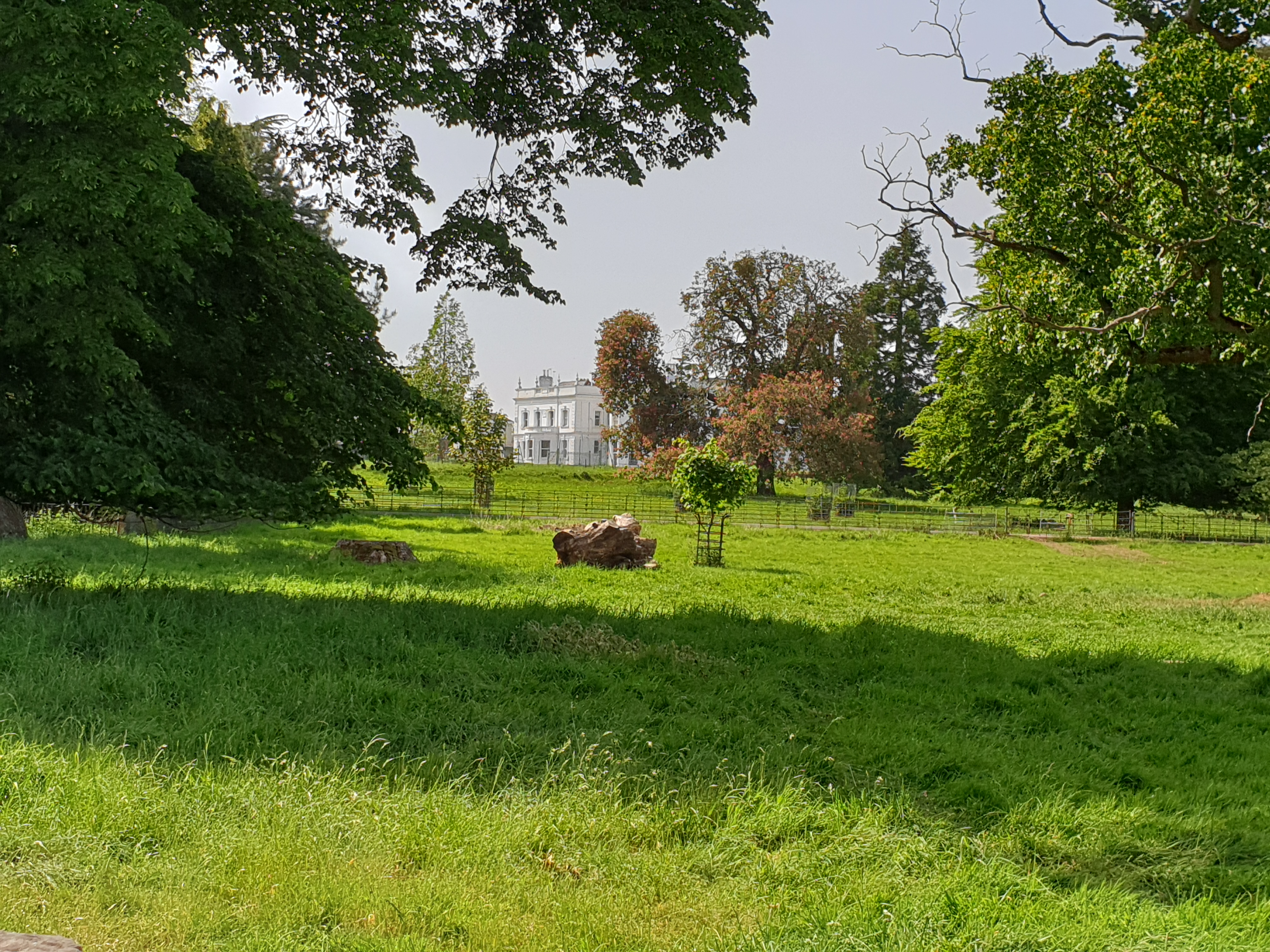
Langford Estate with Langford House in the distance

In mourning after Mary Ann's death, Hill returned to South Africa, but could not settle, and in June 1876, he decided to find somewhere to live near Churchill, close to his friend William Bobbett. In mid-1877, Langford House, Lower Langford, came on to the market after the owner, William Turner, a partner in a ship and marine insurance broker company in Bristol, died on 13 November 1876. Hill purchased the estate and took up residence at the end of October 1877. (Note: Hill was living at William Bobbett's home, Sidney Villa in Dinghurst, Churchill, until he moved into Langford House.) The estate included 35 acres (14 hectares) of parkland, 8 acres (3.2 hectares) of orchards, 4 acres (1.6 hectares) of arable land, stabling, and two adjacent, semi-detached houses in Langford village, known as Mendip Villa and Richmond House. (Note: Both houses are Grade II listed. Mendip Villa is now known as St Mary's House. Mendip Villa was let to Hill's sister, Elizabeth Tapscott, and her daughter, Charlotte Elizabeth, and Richmond House was let to Mary Jane Stone, Elizabeth Tapscott's elder daughter, Mary Jane was the widow of Alfred Stone, the first choirmaster of the Bristol Musical Festival, and the compiler of The Bristol Tune-Book.)

Hill retired from commercial life after dissolving the Savage & Hill partnership on 1 November 1881. By that point, he had accumulated considerable wealth, and consequently, was able to spend a substantial amount of money making improvements to Langford House. He re-modelled the house, added a belvedere tower in Italianate style, (Note: Erected before August 1890. Hill was the superintendent for the Sunday school at the Methodist schoolroom in Churchill. He would issue regular invitations to the school children and their teachers to take afternoon tea at Langford House. The house and gardens would be "thrown open", and this would include taking the view from the tower.) and decorated the interior in typical Victorian style with dark paint and panelling. (Note: Langford house is Grade II listed by Historic England. Nikolaus Pevsner described Langford House as "an ambitious Italianate villa of circa 1850, with the indispensable asymmetrically placed tower; wings were added later.") In 1891, a clock tower was built above the coach house and a gilt turret clock and carillon installed in November of that year. (Note: The clock chimed the quarter hours and played All Things Bright and Beautiful on the hour. The clock and carillon were supplied and fixed by M. Michiels of Mélins, Belgium. The eight toned peal of bells weighed 102 kilograms (2 hundredweight) in total, and were made and installed by John Taylor & Co of Loughborough.) He installed a conservatory and greenhouses, constructed in teak by Foster and Pearson of Beeston, Nottinghamshire, to provide the bedding and house plants for the estate.

=== Livestock breeding ===
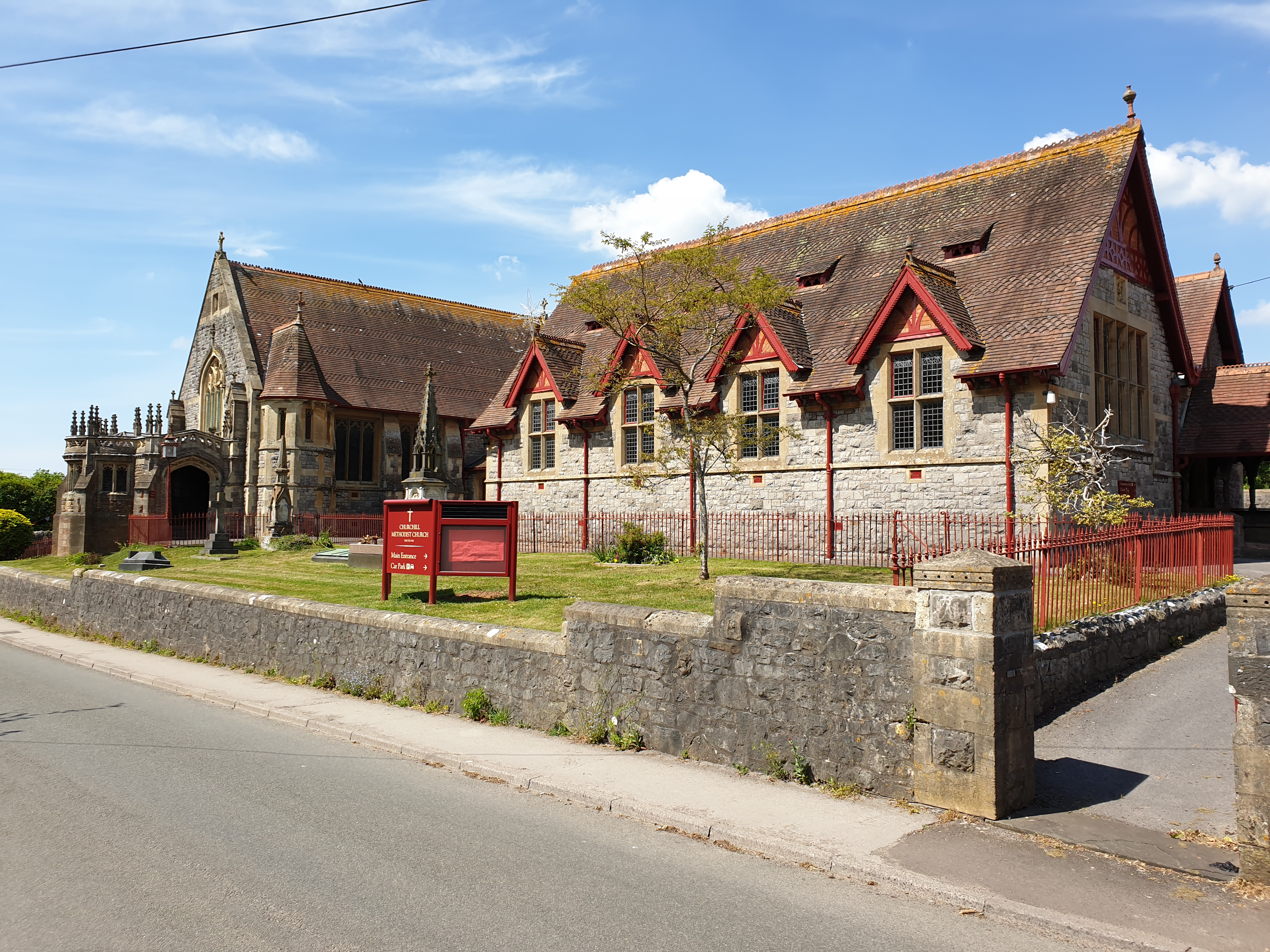
Wesley Methodist church in Front Street, Churchill, built in memory of Mary Ann Hill

Hill took up a new life as a gentleman farmer, adding stables to the estate, a dairy and "Langford Bullock Palaces" for his prized Red Scotch Shorthorn cattle. (Note: The sheds that housed the Shorthorns were called "Bullock Palaces" as each animal had a dormer window and other modern conveniences.) He was well known as a breeder of pedigree shorthorn cattle, Southdown sheep, hackney, and shire horses. In 1881, he laid the foundation for his herd by purchasing two pedigree Dairy Shorthorns cows, Minerva and Irony, and the pedigree bull Oswald 50118, from Richard Stratton of Duffryn, Newport. However, by 1892 the herd had outgrown their accommodation, and they were sold at auction. Between 1897 and 1898, Hill purchased six cows, that included the pedigree cow Lavender Gem, and her heifer calf Lavender Wreath. The two cows had offspring that were show prize winners. The whole of the herd was of Scottish origin, apart from shorthorns purchased from Joseph Dean Willis of Bapton on 30 July 1897. The herd was dispersed shortly after Hill's death, in an auction held at Langford House on 10 September 1908. (Note: There is a memorial stone at the southern end of the lawn at Langford House. It remembers Hill's first cow, named Crummy, "a docile creature and good milker", who died in 1888 aged eleven. The stone also records four much-loved dogs, namely Lion, Leo, Glen and Captain.)

=== Work for the Methodist Church ===
Hill did much to further the work of the Methodist church in Somerset and help those in need. In memory of Mary Ann Hill, he founded the Memorial Wesley Methodist church and schoolroom at Churchill. He also vested in trustees a large sum of money to provide an income for the maintenance of the chapel and schoolroom. In 1887, he founded Victoria Jubilee Homes, and gifted a farm and lands at Congresbury, to provide for repairs and maintenance. From the 1890s, Methodists had come from the North of England to be employed at the paper mills in Redcliffe Street, Cheddar, and from South Wales at the shirt factories located in the Cheddar Gorge. Around the mid-1890s, Methodist society leaders at Cheddar, Somerset, began to see the need for larger and more convenient premises. Hill was approached, and two cottages, (Note: One of the cottages stood where the chapel entrance gates are now.) and the garden and orchard behind the existing chapel, were purchased. A manse to replace the one at Axbridge, two ministers' houses on the Worle Road, Banwell, and a furnished chapel in Cheddar were all gifted by Hill, including the furnishings for a schoolroom that was created by converting the old chapel. He also funded and endowed twelve Wesleyan Cottage Homes at Churchill.

=== Other charitable acts ===
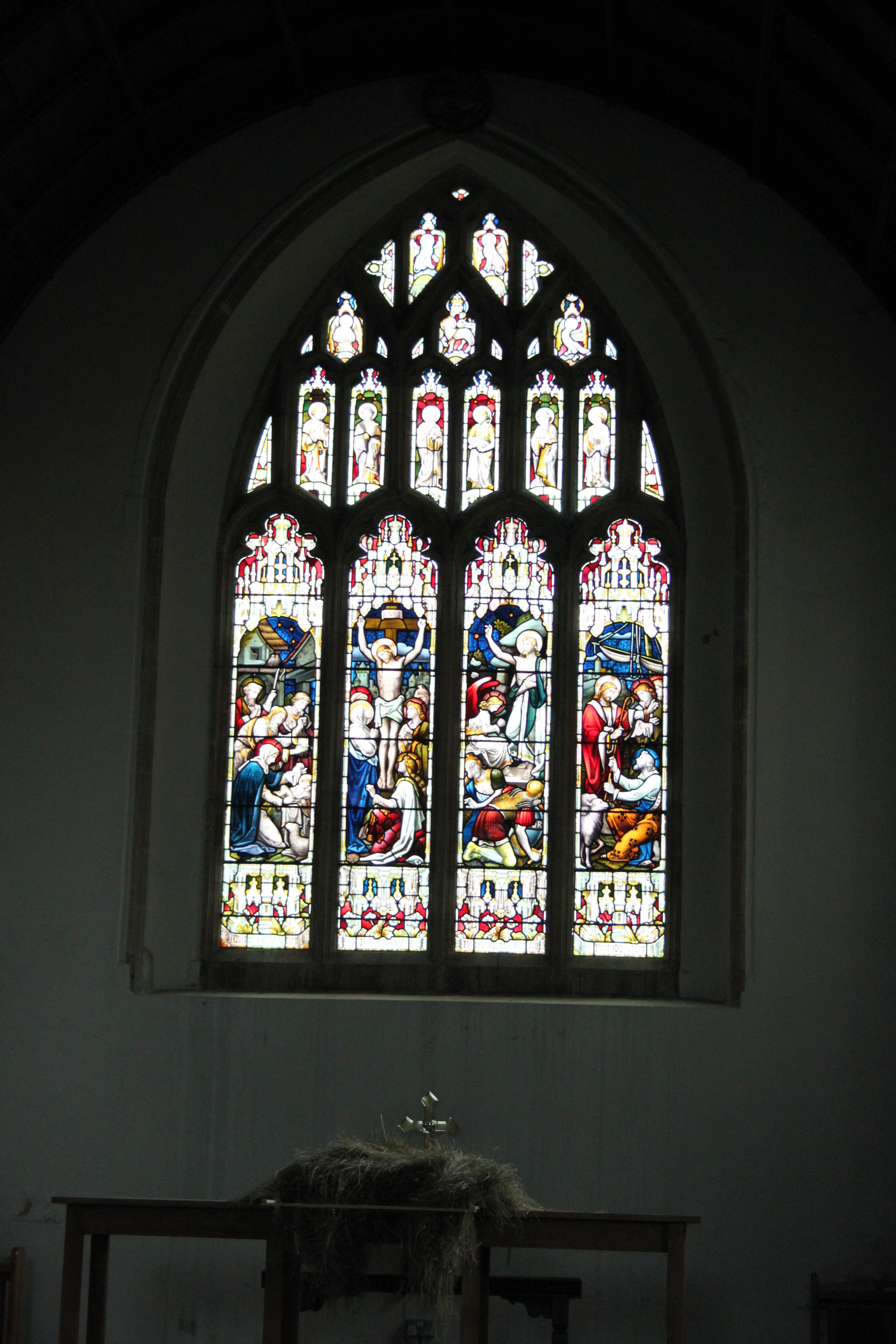
Stained glass window gifted by Hill to Axbridge parish church after its restoration in 1887 (Note: The church of St John the Baptist, Axbridge, re-opened after its restoration on 24 June 1887 (Midsummer's Day). The stained glass window is set in the east end of the church and was made by Messrs. Bell & Sons, of Bristol. The four lights represent respectively the Nativity, Crucifixion, Resurrection, and Feed my Lambs. The divisions of the tracery are occupied by figures of the Four Evangelists, with their symbols, and Moses and Elijah, a central division containing the "Agnus Dei" emblem of St John the Baptist and arms of the town. The Rector of Axbridge, Reverend Henry Toft, selected the design.)

Although a life-long Methodist, Hill helped other Christian institutions such as contributing to Churchill parish church funds, donating £100 to the building of All Saints Church, Sandford, and gifting a stained glass window to Axbridge parish church after its restoration in 1887. Hill would also help people directly: He would notice those needing help and make enquiries about them. A note would be given to them to take to the post office in Churchill. The two upstairs rooms of the office were full of household items provided by Langford House. Arthur Henry Carter, the owner of the post office, would follow the instructions in the note and supply blankets, boots, food or whatever was required. At Christmas, children who attended the Methodist Sunday school were given a set of clothes each and the contents of each parcel were noted so that the same things were not included for the following Christmas. (Note: On 21 December 1885, Langford House was "besieged" by hundreds of people receiving gifts of bread, tea, and sugar. In addition, parcels of clothing and bedding were sent to a large number of people in the parish.) Hill was also a long-term supporter of the Bristol Hospital for Sick Children and Women, and would visit the hospital on Christmas Day, giving money to each patient and nurse.

=== Public life ===
On 11 June 1885, Hill was elected a fellow of the Royal Colonial Institute, and by May 1886, he was a steward of the Infant Orphanage Asylum. He was a Liberal in politics and was selected as a vice-president of the Wells Liberal Association on 20 May 1886. On 19 October 1886, he was made a justice of the peace for Somerset and served on the Axbridge bench for over 20 years. (Note: After imposing a heavy fine as an example to others, he would often pay it himself, on condition that the accused promised to reform, abstain from alcohol, and from time to time, report to the police.) From 1887, he served as the vice-president of the Weston‑super‑Mare and East Somerset horticultural society, and in January of the following year, he accepted the office of president of the society. By January 1890, he had been elected to the Council of the Imperial Federation League. He took lead positions amongst the Wesleyans of the Bristol and Bath district, representing the district at church synods and conferences.

Hill also undertook parish responsibilities such as being president of the Churchill football and cricket clubs. He lent a field free of charge for their use in Langford House grounds and contributed to the finances of each club. He was an organiser for the Jubilee and Coronation celebrations that were hosted in the grounds of Langford House. On 7 February 1899, he was elected vice-president of the Wrington and District Fanciers' Association.

== Death and funeral ==
The chief thing that dominated him was his religion. It was not something that entered into his life, it was his life, governing, influencing all his thinking, all his planning, all his actions, all his conversation.

— The Reverend William Perkins at Hill's funeral.

After returning from church on 26 January 1908, at about 4:00 pm, Hill slipped while walking across the Langford House hallway, fracturing his thigh. After four weeks, his thigh seemed to be healing, and the splints were removed. However, more serious complications developed; influenza followed by pneumonia, and he died at 11:45 am on 3 March 1908, aged 78. The funeral was held at the Wesleyan Methodist church, Churchill, on 10 March 1908, at 2:00 pm.

Despite the cold and windy weather that day, hundreds of people attended from Churchill, Langford, Wrington, and other villages; there were so many mourners that the service had to be held outside the Methodist chapel. The outdoor staff of the Langford House estate, which including nine gardeners, headed the funeral's foot procession. The coffin bore the inscription "Simon Sidney Hill, born 1 October 1829, died 3 March 1908" and he was interred in the same grave as Mary Ann Hill. A memorial service was held at the Methodist chapel, Cheddar, in the evening of 15 March 1908, and was conducted by Henry John Stockbridge.

== Legacy ==
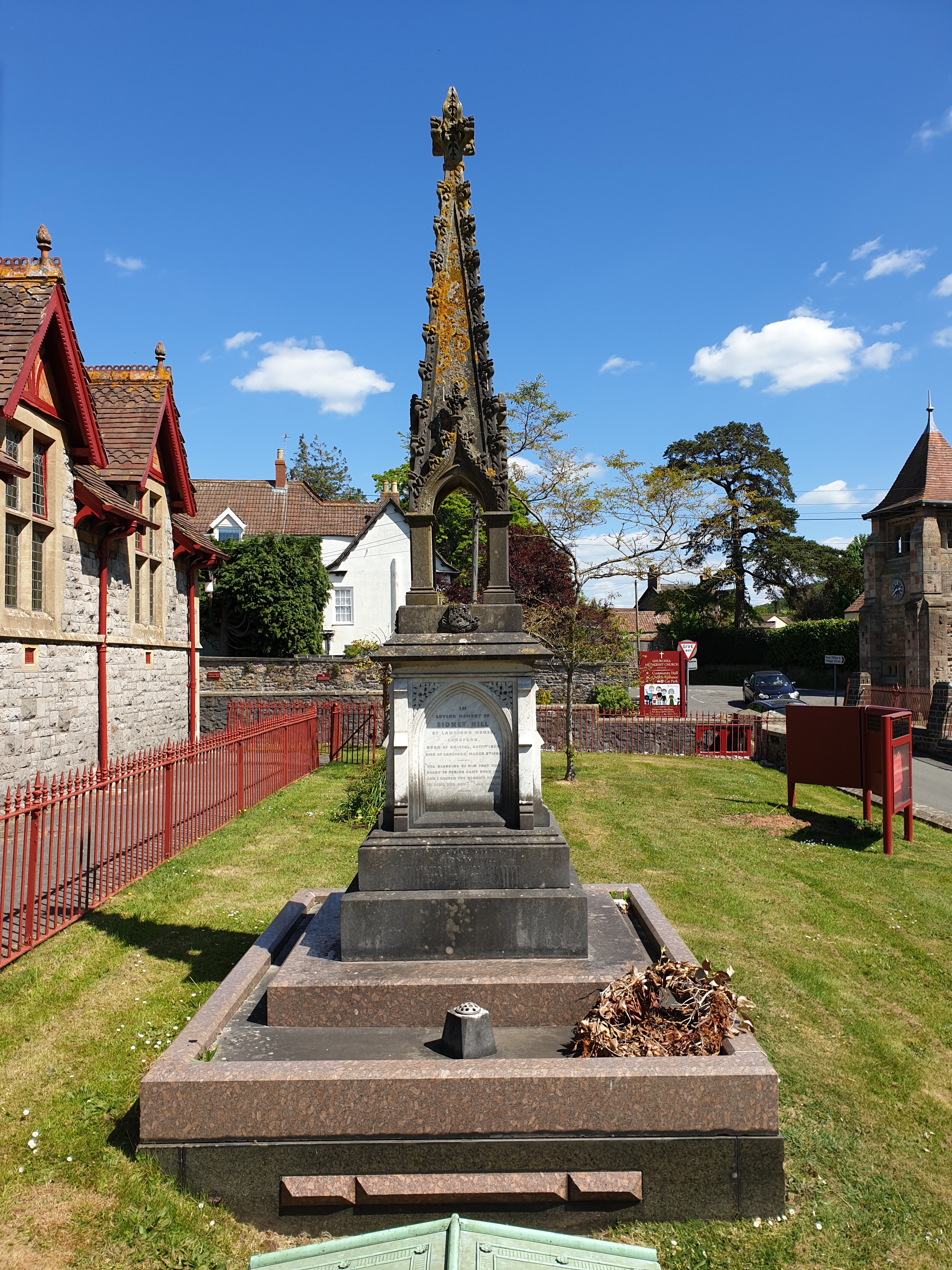
Hill's grave at the Methodist church in Churchill, North Somerset

Langford House was later left to Hill's nephew Thomas James Hill, but he only lived there for four years before his death on 9 February 1912. The terms of the will were that the next beneficiary was James Alfred Hill, another nephew, but he had died at Kimberley, Northern Cape, South Africa, on 27 January 1910 (aged 60), so the occupancy was taken up by Thomas Sidney Hill (known as the "second Sidney Hill"), a great-nephew, and the eldest son of Thomas James Hill. Thomas Sidney Hill died on 25 September 1944 (aged 70), and two years later, the Commissioners of Crown Land bought Langford House. In 1948, the University of Bristol founded the School of Veterinary Science there. Many of Hill's other charitable works still survive today; Victoria Jubilee Langford Homes and the Sidney Hill Churchill Wesleyan Cottage Homes are registered charities providing housing for local people in need.

Hill's memory lives on in the legacy of buildings that he founded, but he meant more than this to some of his neighbours. The late Ronald Henry Bailey, a former editor of The Weston & Somerset Mercury newspaper, and an authority on Mendip folklore and other antiquarian matters, described Hill as:

An exceptional man, among the last of the old school of benefactors who, in the days before National Pensions and State Health Services, made life tolerable for unfortunate neighbours when they fell by the wayside. He died just as the social pattern was changing for the better.

— Ronald Henry Bailey

Nonetheless, Hill's wealth came from trade with southern Africa and it is not certain to what extent his fortune was amassed at the expense of others. On balance, however, it is thought likely that his business dealings as a merchant were without reproach. Certainly, that whatever his attitudes as a younger man, he later shared his wealth with the less fortunate.

== Philanthropic works ==
Hill was prolific in works for the public benefit. He founded and endowed the Queen Victoria Memorial Homes in Langford to benefit those who could not afford to rent decent and safe accommodation. He founded Wesleyan churches, Sunday schools, and ministers' houses in England and in South Africa, and endowed a house at Homes for Little Boys, a former orphanage near Swanley, Kent. He also donated substantial amounts of money to aid the Wesleyan cause: £500 to help build the Wesleyan chapel at Linden Road, Clevedon, and after his death, Hill's estate donated £1,500 to fund the building of the Wesleyan Mission Hall at Seymour Road, Gloucester. His final act to benefit the poor was to fund, furnish, and endow twelve Wesleyan cottage homes at Churchill.

Philanthropic works
Building	Location	Type	Opened	Architect	Grade II Listing (Note: The "Listing Number" is a unique number assigned to each listed building and scheduled monument by Historic England.)	Geo-coordinates	Image
Wesley Methodist chapel	Russell Road, Port Elizabeth	Methodist chapel	20 October 1872	John Thornhill Cook	Not listed	33°57′38″S 25°36′55″E	Sketch of the original Wesley Methodist chapel at Russell Road Port Elizabeth
Wesley Methodist chapel	The original Wesley Methodist chapel at Russell Road, Port Elizabeth, commenced build in 1870, and the foundation stone was laid by Mary Ann Hill. She took an active part in fundraising, and Hill gave the site and contributed about one fifth the entire cost of the schoolroom, chapel, and vestries. The building cost £5,000, and of this, in 1872, when the chapel was completed, only £500 remained to be raised. The Reverend James Fish and Hill then persuaded the other merchants in Main Street to donate, and in hours, the remaining amount was raised. The church was opened on 20 October 1872 and Hill later presented a memorial window to the chapel in memory of Mary Ann Hill. The chapel was closed on 7 December 1969 and demolished for road works. The replacement church, Centenary Methodist Church, designed by Garth Robertson, was opened on 14 December 1969.						Sketch of the original Wesley Methodist chapel at Russell Road Port Elizabeth
Wesley Methodist Memorial church and schoolroom	Churchill	Methodist church	2 May 1881	Foster and Wood of Bristol	1157925	51°20′04″N 2°48′01″W	Picture of the Wesley Methodist church in Front Street, Churchill, taken from the opposite side (south) of the road. The church is shown with red painted window ledges and the cemetery surrounded by red railings
Wesley Methodist Memorial church and schoolroom	The church was built in memory of Mary Ann Hill. He also funded a hall adjacent to the church, where he could hold secular meetings, and appointed Endowment Trustees to run it. A porch, funded by Hill, was added in 1898, designed by Foster and Wood of Bristol, and built by Henry Rose of Churchill.						Picture of the Wesley Methodist church in Front Street, Churchill, taken from the opposite side (south) of the road. The church is shown with red painted window ledges and the cemetery surrounded by red railings
Mrs Hill Memorial Cottage	Port Elizabeth	Wesleyan almshouse	January 1883	John Thornhill Cook	Not listed	33°57′42″S 25°36′29″E	Port Elizabeth Ladies' Benevolent Society Cottages built in 1899
Mrs Hill Memorial Cottage	At Hill's request, and in memory of Mary Ann Hill, the Port Elizabeth Ladies' Benevolent Society funded a small cottage on the Cape Road. Mary Ann Hill had joined the society at the beginning of 1868 and had been active in helping the disadvantaged. (Note: The Port Elizabeth Ladies' Benevolent Society, formerly the Dorcas society, was founded to "relieve cases of distress and destitution ... and especially to assist aged and infirm persons with young children.") It was intended as an almshouse where poor women could live rent free. It came with four rooms, a small garden, running water, and was capable of accommodating two people. The cottage no longer exists.						Port Elizabeth Ladies' Benevolent Society Cottages built in 1899
Dame's House	Hextable, Swanley	Orphanage	20 July 1883	Henry Spalding and Patrick Auld	Not listed	51°24′53″N 0°11′00″E	Furness School, New Building, at Hextable
Dame's House	Hill funded and furnished a dame's house (or mother's house) for Homes for Little Boys, a former orphanage near Swanley, Kent. A dame's home provided accommodation for a member of staff, usually female, and known as a dame, who was responsible for the boys' welfare. Boys were first placed in the dame's house and then proceeded to one of the assistant master's houses, and finally the headmaster's house. The Prince and Princess of Wales travelled by special train to open the homes. The site now houses Broomhill Bank and Furness School, Rowhill Road, Hextable, Swanley, Kent.						Furness School, New Building, at Hextable
Victoria Jubilee Homes	Langford	Wesleyan almshouse	1891	Joseph Wood of Foster and Wood of Bristol.	1320910	51°20′33″N 2°46′19″W	Victoria Jubilee Homes at Langford, North Somerset
Victoria Jubilee Homes	In commemoration of the Golden Jubilee of Queen Victoria, and in an effort to benefit the poor around him, Hill acquired and cleared land at Langford, and funded six dwellings known as the Victoria Jubilee Langford Homes. Hill laid the foundation stone on 1 October 1887, his fifty-eighth birthday, and invitations to tender for the build were advertised by Foster and Wood on 9 January 1888. Rookery Farm with 65 acres (26 hectares) of land, and a further 22 acres (8.9 hectares) at Smallway, both in Congresbury, were purchased as an endowment to provide income for repairs and to pay the residents of each house a sum of £30 per year towards maintenance. The total cost was £14,300 plus a further £1,300 to reinstate Rookery Farm, and from the endowment, rental totalling £229 per annum was secured.						Victoria Jubilee Homes at Langford, North Somerset
Wesley Methodist chapel	Shipham	Methodist chapel	3 April 1893	Foster and Wood of Bristol	Not listed	51°18′51″N 2°47′52″W	Former Wesley Methodist chapel at Shipham, Somerset
Wesley Methodist chapel	The chapel was dedicated to the memory of William Bobbett, Hill's life-long friend and Methodist class leader in 1847, and Mary Ann Hill's uncle. It was built by Charles Franks of Ubley and George Simmons of Priddy. The chapel is now a private residence.						Former Wesley Methodist chapel at Shipham, Somerset
Jubilee clock tower	Churchill	Clock tower	20 June 1897	Joseph Foster Wood of Foster and Wood of Bristol. (Note: Joseph Foster Wood was the son and nephew of the founders of Foster & Wood.)	1129198	51°20′02″N 2°47′59″W	Jubilee clock tower, built in 1897 to mark Queen Victoria's Diamond Jubilee
Jubilee clock tower	The clock tower, chimes, and drinking fountain were built to commemorate Queen Victoria's Diamond Jubilee in 1897. (Note: The following is inscribed around the tower: "June 20, 1897 this tower & clock was erected by Sidney Hill JP of Langford House in this parish to commemorate the sixty years of the beneficent reign of her most gracious majesty Queen Victoria.") In 1976, the clock and chimes were refurbished and renovated by the then trust that managed the clock tower. In the following year, for the Queen's Silver Jubilee, the tower was cleaned by a team of volunteers led by Arthur Raymond Millard (Ray Millard), former chairman of Churchill Parish Council.						Jubilee clock tower, built in 1897 to mark Queen Victoria's Diamond Jubilee
Memorial Jubilee Wesley Methodist chapel	Cheddar	Methodist chapel	28 September 1897	Foster and Wood of Bristol	Not listed	51°16′39″N 2°46′33″W	Wesley Methodist chapel in Cheddar, Somerset
Memorial Jubilee Wesley Methodist chapel	Hill funded and furnished a manse and a new chapel. It was built by the local firms of John Scourse and Son and Isaac Ford and Son. The old chapel was converted to a school. Running around the chancel, beneath the east window, is a brass plate bearing the following inscription: This memorial jubilee church is erected to the glory of God by Sidney Hill, J.P., of Langford House, Langford, to record the donor's introduction into Methodism, September, 1847, also in memory of one of the most excellent of women, for ten years the partner of his life.						Wesley Methodist chapel in Cheddar, Somerset
Memorial Centenary Wesley Methodist chapel	Sandford	Methodist chapel	11 October 1900	Foster and Wood of Bristol	1320686	51°19′47″N 2°50′02″W	Wesley Methodist Centenary chapel on Hill Road, Sandford, Somerset
Memorial Centenary Wesley Methodist chapel	The chapel was designed in Perpendicular Gothic style and built of Rowberrow stone with Doulting freestone dressings. Hill gifted the chapel on condition that the old chapel was converted into a school. It was built by Thomas Ford, John Scourse, and John Coles, builders and masons at Cheddar.						Wesley Methodist Centenary chapel on Hill Road, Sandford, Somerset
Wesley Methodist Centenary chapel and schoolroom	Blagdon	Methodist chapel	12 June 1907	Sir Frank William Wills	Not listed	51°19′37″N 2°43′09″W	Former Wesley Methodist chapel at Blagdon, North Somerset
Wesley Methodist Centenary chapel and schoolroom	The chapel was dedicated to the memory of Thomas Francis Christopher May, a lifelong friend of Hill. The foundation stone was laid on 19 October 1906 by May's widow, Ann Reece, née Bowyer. Hill had given £1,500 to fund the building of the chapel. The chapel and school was opened by Hill and a caretaker's cottage was also completed at a later date. The chapel and school are now private residences.						Former Wesley Methodist chapel at Blagdon, North Somerset
Sidney Hill Cottage Homes	Churchill	Wesleyan almshouse	December 1907	Silcock and Reay of Bath and London	1129199	51°20′07″N 2°48′17″W	Sidney Hill Wesleyan Cottage Homes at Churchill, North Somerset The Harbour of Refuge by Frederick Walker (1872)
Sidney Hill Cottage Homes	The homes were intended to provide comfortable and furnished homes for the "deserving poor", and a fund was set aside to produce an income of £400 a year for their maintenance. Twelve cottages were built, arranged on three sides of a quadrangle, about 37 metres (120 feet) square, with landscaped gardens. The third, or south side, was enclosed by a low terrace wall with wrought iron gates. A large stone sundial, with a spreading base, was placed in the centre of the quadrangle. Each house had a living room, with a small scullery, larder, coal house, and one bedroom with a large storeroom. The cost of the buildings, including the furniture, the trustees' room, a cottage for the matron, a small, but fully equipped, laundry and other out-buildings, amounted to just under £13,000, with the gardens and planting costing £900. The sundial and matron's cottage are listed separately by Historic England. The architect's coloured drawing of the homes was sufficiently well thought of to be included in the 1906 Royal Academy Exhibition. It was said to be inspired by the painting "Harbour of Refuge", painted in 1872 by Frederick Walker, and now in the Tate Gallery.						Sidney Hill Wesleyan Cottage Homes at Churchill, North Somerset The Harbour of Refuge by Frederick Walker (1872)

== Arms ==
In 1882, arms were granted and confirmed. According to Fox‑Davies in Armorial Families (1895), Hill bore:

Coat of arms of Sidney Hill
Notes Hill's coat of arms is displayed over the entrance to Victoria Jubilee Homes, Langford, North Somerset. For an image of the Hill arms, see Armorial Families (1895), page 1311, image 5, plate 92. Crest Upon a wreath of the colours, a talbot's head couped argent, charged with a chevron nebuly, and holding in the mouth a fleur‑de‑lis azme. Helm Upon the escutcheon is placed a helmet befitting his degree, with a mantling azure and argent. Escutcheon Azure, a chevron nebuly argent, charged with three pallets gules, between two fleurs‑de‑lis in chief and a talbot's head erased in base of the second. Motto Omne bonum Dei donum, translates as "Every good thing is a gift of God", and is taken from James, chapter 1, verse 17.

== See also ==
- Cape Colony
- Churchill, North Somerset
- Lower Langford
- Wesleyan Methodist Church (Great Britain)
