= George Sandys (politician) =

British politician (1875–1937)

Captain George Sandys
- Sandys in 1910

Member of Parliament for Wells
- In office 15 January 1910 – 14 December 1918
- Prime Minister: H. H. Asquith
- Preceded by: Thomas Ball Silcock
- Succeeded by: Harry Greer

Personal details
- Born: George John Sandys; 23 September 1875 Slade House, Stroud, Gloucestershire
- Died: 3 September 1937 (aged 61) Antibes, France
- Party: Conservative
- Spouse: Mildred Helen Cameron (m. 1905; div. 1921)
- Relations: Laura Sandys (granddaughter); Edwina Sandys (granddaughter)
- Children: Duncan Sandys (b. 1908)
- Parent: James Sandys (father)
- Education: Clifton College; Pembroke College, Oxford
- Profession: Diplomat

Military service
- Allegiance: United Kingdom
- Branch/service: British Army
- Rank: Lieutenant (British Army and Royal Marines)
- Unit: 5th Dragoon Guards
- Battles/wars: South African War

Captain George John Sandys (/ˈsændz/; 23 September 1875 – 3 September 1937) was a British diplomat and Conservative politician.

== Early life ==
Sandys was the son of James Sandys, of Slade House, Stroud, Gloucestershire, and was educated at Clifton College and Pembroke College, Oxford.

== Military career ==
He was commissioned as a second lieutenant and served with the Glamorgan Yeomanry in the Second Boer War from 1899, then transferred to the regular army when he became a second lieutenant in the 5th Dragoon Guards on 15 August 1900, receiving a promotion to lieutenant on 28 August 1901 while still in South Africa. After the war ended, he transferred to the 2nd Life Guards in November 1902, leaving the army in 1905. He rejoined to serve in the British Expeditionary Force in the First World War and was wounded at Ypres.

== Parliamentary and diplomatic career ==
Sandys was a Member of Parliament for Wells from 1910 to 1918. He later joined the diplomatic service, serving as an Honorary Attaché in the British Legation in Bern (1921–22) and Paris (1922-25).

== Personal life ==
He married Mildred Helen, née Cameron, daughter of Duncan Cameron, of Canterbury, New Zealand in 1905. They had one child, a son Duncan Sandys. Duncan became a member of parliament and cabinet minister, and Duncan's daughter Laura Sandys, also a Conservative politician, was elected to represent South Thanet in 2010. Sandys divorced Mildred in January 1921. He died in Antibes, France on 3 September 1937.

Parliament of the United Kingdom
Preceded by Thomas Ball Silcock	Member of Parliament for Wells; 1910–1918	Succeeded by Harry Greer
