= Lily Goddard =

- Born: 14 March 1916; Vienna, Austria
- Died: 7 March 2002 (aged 85)
- Education: Vienna School of Art
- Known for: Textile design

Lily Goddard FRSA FCSD (1916 – 2002) was an Austrian textile designer. She attended the Vienna School of Art where she was taught by, among others, Professor Ernst Gombrich, Professor Joseph Hoffmann and Professor Czisek.

She joined the Chartered Society of Designers (then the Society of Industrial Artists and Designers) in 1950, being very active in the 1960s and 1970s in the Fashion and Textiles Group. She specialised in printed textiles, paper products and carpets and her clients included Liberty textiles, Deeko paperware, Crossley carpets and Sanderson wallpapers. Several examples are available online at VADS - the online resource for visual arts (link below),

Goddard was granted Fellowship of the CSD in 1976. Part of her huge collection of designs, manufactured samples and her cuttings books are housed in the Victoria and Albert Museum, London (see link below). She was made a Fellow of the Royal Society of Arts in 1978.

She taught art at primary, secondary and further education levels and lectured extensively in England and Ireland. She wrote and published four books, one on coal hole covers and other street furniture and three volumes of poetry.

She married Sidney in 1950 who died in 1976. She died in March 2002 leaving a son, Larry and a granddaughter, Stephanie.

== Publications ==
- Goddard, Lily (1979). Coalhole Rubbings: the Story of an Artefact in our Streets. Midas Books. ISBN 0859361896.
- Goddard, Lily (1983). Nostalgia without Tears: Reflections in prose and verse. Lily Goddard. ISBN 0950890901.
- Goddard, Lily (1987). The Whispering Heart: Poems. Lily Goddard. ISBN 095089091X.
- Goddard, Lily (1990). Twilight: Poems. Spellmount Publishers Ltd. ISBN 0946771081.
- Goddard, Lily (2020). Carrie; the story of a survivor. Amazon. ISBN 979-8590578276.
