= Thomas Raffles Davison =

English architect, architectural illustrator and journalist (1853–1937)

- Born: 1853; Stockton-on-Tees, England
- Died: 5 May 1937 (aged 84); Woldingham, Surrey, England
- Occupation(s): Architect, illustrator, editor of The British Architect
- Known for: Architectural illustration

Thomas Raffles Davison ARIBA (1853 – 5 May 1937), usually credited as Raffles Davison or T. Raffles Davison, was an English architect, architectural illustrator and journalist of the late 19th and early 20th centuries. His work featured in The British Architect and Northern Engineer for over 40 years from 1874, and he became editor of the publication in 1878 until it merged with The Builder in 1919.

== Early life ==
He was born in Stockton-on-Tees in 1853, the second son of a Congregational minister. Educated privately at Shrewsbury, he showed a rare talent for drawing from an early age and it was partly for this reason that he was articled to the architect W H Spaull in Oswestry. On completion of his articles he worked for a time as architectural assistant in offices in Nottingham and in the office of H J Paull of Manchester.

== Career ==
Although he subsequently carried out some minor architectural commissions on his own account, it was his drawing skills that would lead him to become the leading architectural illustrator of his generation.

== The British Architect ==
His arrival in Manchester coincided with a move by several local architects to set up an architectural magazine to rival the London-based Builder. Davison became a major contributor to The British Architect and Northern Engineer and was appointed editor in 1878. In 1896, by which date the magazine had relocated to London, Davison became an Honorary Associate of the Royal Institute of British Architects; he was later active in the work of the London Society.

== Architectural illustration ==
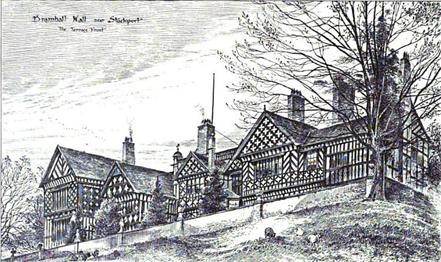
Sketch of the south end of Bramall Hall

Some of his sketches - published in the magazine as Rambling Sketches (also the title of a book published in 1883) - were exhibited at the Royal Academy Summer Exhibitions, and at the Modern Gallery in 1907, in New York City after 1919 and in the RIBA Galleries in 1924. His presentation of architects' designs made him popular with many of the country’s leading architects, some of whom supported a book Record of Life and Work from 1870 to 1926 marking his retirement in 1927, with an introduction by Sir Reginald Blomfield RA. Then Sir Aston Webb wrote:

"To architects he has been known for nearly half a century for his peculiar power in transferring their elevations and sections into perspective form, not only understandable by the layman but truthfully portraying the design of the architect."

== Death ==
Raffles Davidson died on 5 May 1937, aged 84. at his home, “Whistler’s Hollow,” Woldingham, Surrey. This house had been designed by W Rupert Davison, although has also been credited to T. Raffles Davison himself. Davison had himself commented, "It would be idle to deny that to an architect the allurement of the art of drawing is sometimes divergent from his architecture. The consolation is that some men are so allured that they end up making very good drawings which are stimulative and useful, whilst they are saved from doing some very bad architecture."

=== Obituaries ===
- "Obituary". The Builder. 7 May 1937. p. 967.
- "Obituary". The Builder. 14 May 1937. p. 1024.
- W T Plume (22 May 1937). "Memoir of Davison". RIBA Journal. 44. London: Royal Institute of British Architects: 753.

== Works ==
=== Architecture ===
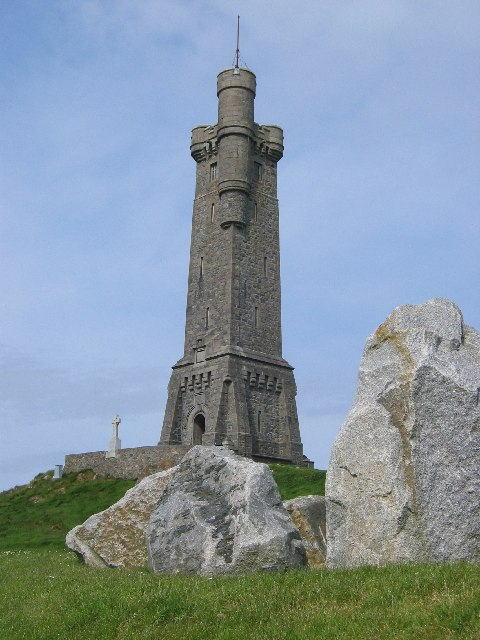
Lewis War Memorial, Stornoway

- 1920 Stornoway Town Improvement Scheme Stornoway, Lewis, Ross and Cromarty Scotland
- 1926 King's College, Elphinstone Hall, Aberdeen, Scotland Prepared perspective exhibited at Royal Scottish Academy later reproduced in The Builder
- 1927 Stornoway War Memorial Stornoway, Lewis, Ross and Cromarty, Scotland In conjunction with Viscount Leverhulme

=== Publications ===
- Rambling Sketches.
- Down to the Land's End. The British Architect. 1887.
- Modern Homes. Bell & Company. 1909.
- Pen & Ink Notes, Glasgow Exhibition (dedicated to Queen Victoria ed.). Virtue & Co.
- Memorials of the Past.
- Port Sunlight. Batsford. 1916.
- T Raffles Davison, ed. (1909). The Arts Connected With Building: Lectures On Craftsmanship And Design Delivered At Carpenters Hall. Batsford.
- Lectures Delivered By R. W. Schultz, C. F. A. Voysey, E. Guy Dawber, Laurence A. Turner, F. W. Troup, A. Romney Green, M. H. Baillie Scott, Charles Spooner and J. Sharkie Gardner.
- Lakeman, Albert (1918). Concrete Cottages Bungalows and Garages. illus. T. Raffles Davison. Concrete Publications.
