= Robert Richard Hieronimus =

American artist (born 1943)

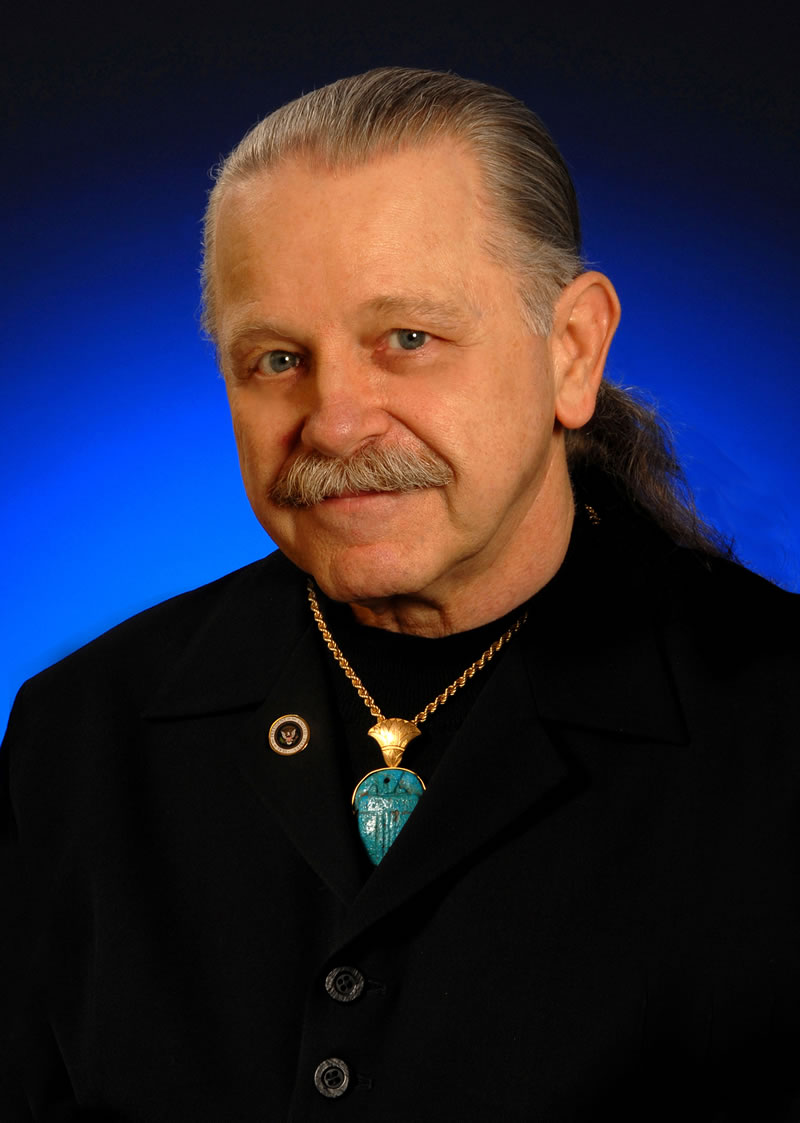
- Born: September 16, 1943 (age 83); Baltimore, Maryland, U.S.
- Movement: New Paradigm

f

Robert Richard Hieronimus (born September 16, 1943) is an American educator, artist, author, activist. He is known for his murals and artcars which earned him acknowledgment as a pioneer of the "New Paradigm" movement in the late 60s and 70s in Baltimore, MD. Most famously, his painted Volkswagen Bus "LIGHT" made headlines when an Associated Press photographer captured it at the 1969 Woodstock Festival of Music & Arts. Beginning in 1986, he hosted the radio show 21st Century Radio with his collaborator and wife Dr. Zohara Hieronimus. The show provided a platform for the Hieronimuses to share their training in esoteric wisdom traditions with a wider audience.

== Early years and education ==
Hieronimus received a B.S. degree in teaching from Towson State Teacher's College (now Towson University) and he taught art for two years to grade school children.

== Art and esoterica ==
In the late 1960s Hieronimus traveled with Elektra Records and recording artists such as Jimi Hendrix, the Doors, and Janis Joplin to design posters and album covers and share info on esoterica. In 1969 he co-founded AUM, the first state-approved school of esoteric studies in the country which granted certificates in the occult sciences, mystic arts and religious metaphysics. PBS documented his leadership and contributions in 1971 with the feature, "The Artist of Savitria" produced by Maryland Public Television. He continued his study of ancient cultures and symbolism independently, with a particular emphasis on the founding of America. In 1981, Hieronimus was awarded a Ph.D. from Saybrook Graduate School for his doctoral thesis, "An Historic Analysis of the Reverse of the American Great Seal and Its Relationship to the Ideology of Humanistic Psychology."

=== Murals ===
Hieronimus has a long career as a muralist and painter. His occult and symbolic murals include the 2,700-square-foot (250 m^{2}) prophetic Apocalypse completed during 1968–1969 at the Johns Hopkins University. The Historic Views of Baltimore 1752–1858 mural was completed in 1976 and is housed in the War Memorial Building Baltimore, Maryland.

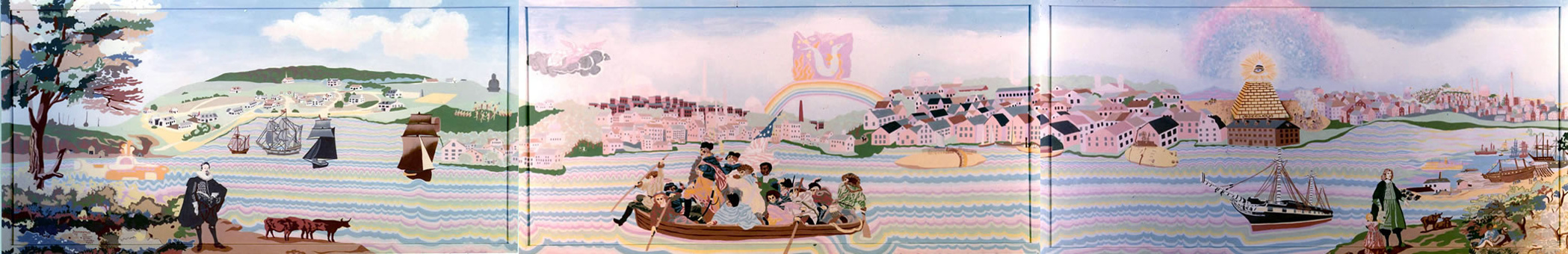
Historic Views of Baltimore 1752–1858, a mural by Hieronimus that has been on display at the Baltimore War Memorial Building

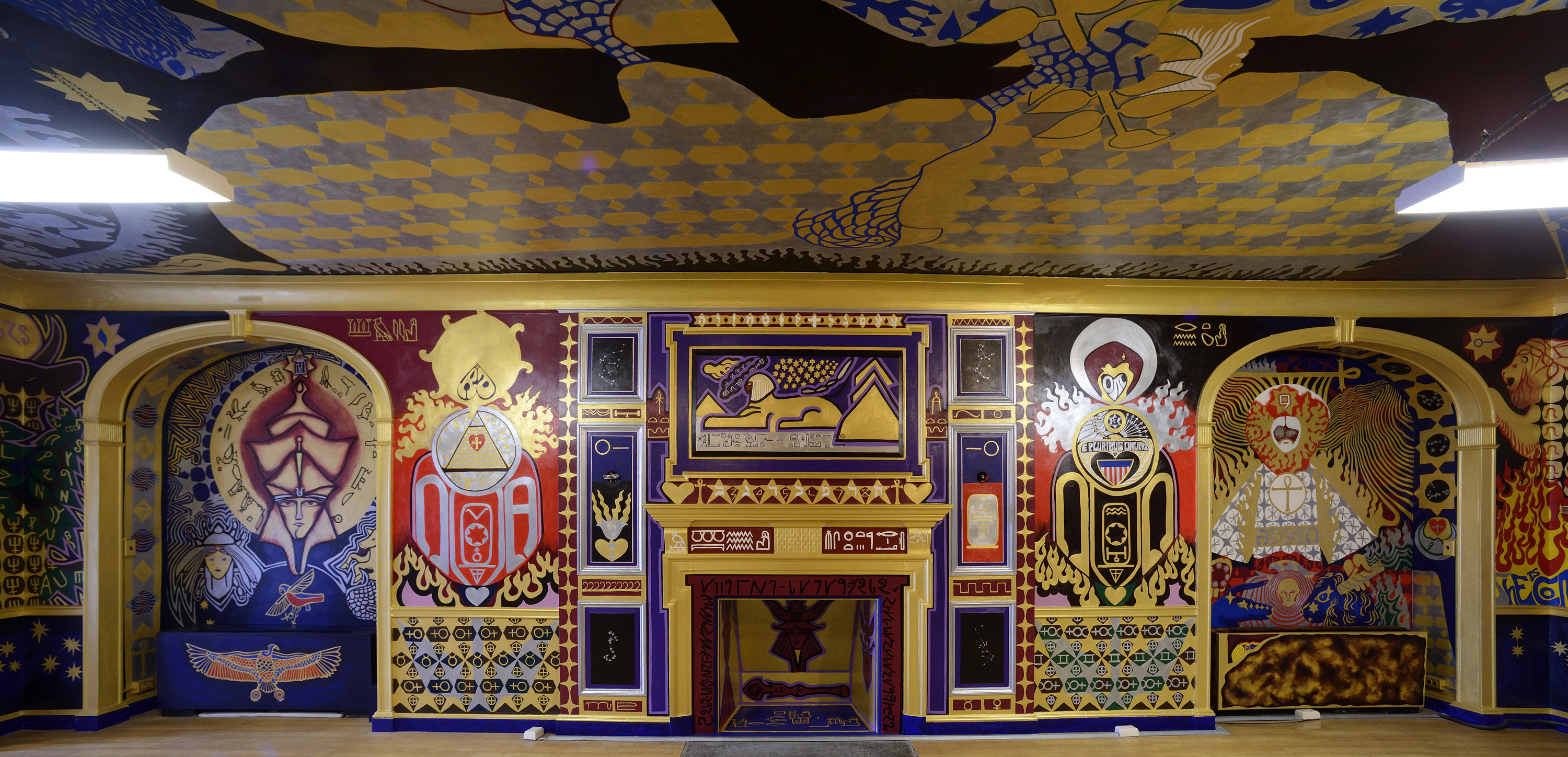
Photograph of the Egypt wall (plus ceiling) at Hieronimus' full-room Apocalypse mural, located in Johns Hopkins University's Levering Hall.

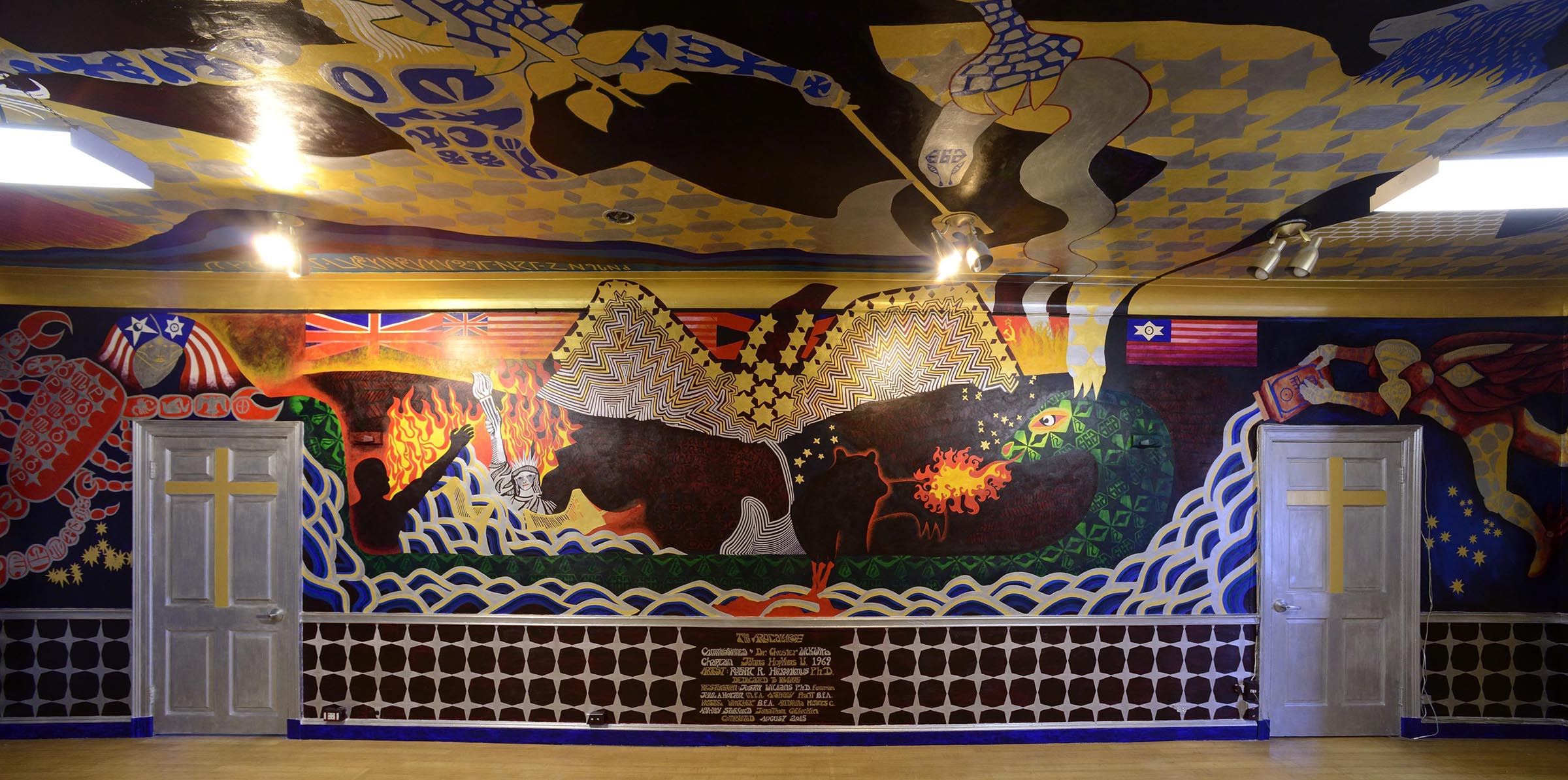
Photograph of the Eagle wall (plus ceiling) at Hieronimus' full-room Apocalypse mural, located in Johns Hopkins University's Levering Hall.

=== The Great Seal of America and U.S. symbolism ===
Hieronimus's research on the Great Seal has been used in the speeches, literature, and libraries of the White House (1976, 1982), the State Department (1978), and the Department of Interior (1982). His Independence Hall speech on the Great Seal's bicentennial was published in the Congressional Record (1983, 1984), and his research was shared in a personal meeting with the late Egyptian President Anwar El-Sadat. Together with his wife, Zohara Meyerhoff Hieronimus, Robert Hieronimus lobbied the House and Senate on the Great Seal Act (1982–1986). Inner Traditions published a popular version of Hieronimus's doctoral thesis in 1989, entitled America's Secret Destiny: Spiritual Vision and the Founding of a Nation. This book was revised and expanded in 2006 under the title Founding Fathers, Secret Societies: Freemasons, Illuminati, Rosicrucians and the Decoding of the Great Seal. As a result of this book, Hieronimus was featured on documentaries on the National Geographic, Discovery and History Channels. Founding Fathers, Secret Societies has been translated into German, French, Russian, and Spanish.

In 2008, New Page Books released his book, United Symbolism of America: Deciphering Hidden Meanings in America's Most Familiar Art, Architecture and Logos, an account of how the Statue of Liberty, the Liberty Bell, the flag, the eagle, the Great Seal, and Washington, D.C., became American icons. Each is examined from a humanistic psychological point of view with interpretations from world cultures, religions, secret societies, archetypes and popular usage. Hieronimus takes a position contrary to growing anti-American sentiment. This book was turned into a 2-hour special on the Discovery Channel called Secret America, a special on the History Channel called Secrets of the Founding Fathers, and was featured in a segment on Canada's Vision TV called "Occult Architecture: Washington DC."

=== The Woodstock bus ===
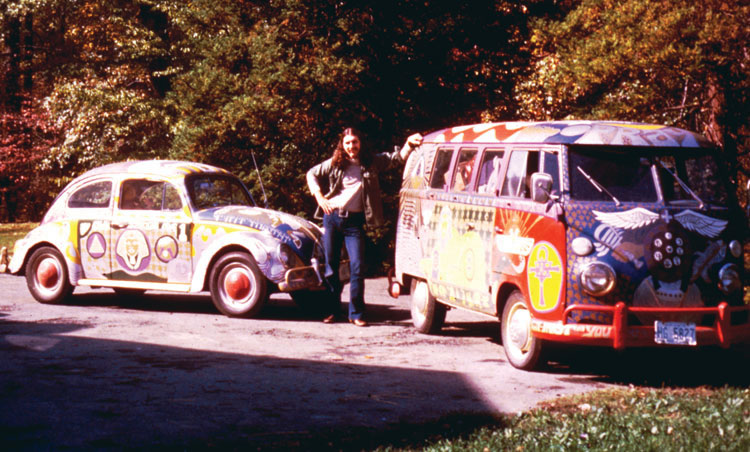
Musician Bob Grimm beside the Woodstock VW "Light", painted by Hieronimus.

Hieronimus's most famous artcar is the Volkswagen bus "Light," better known as "the Woodstock bus." The vehicle was photographed by the Associated Press and Rolling Stone at the original 1969 Woodstock. Referencing esoteric spiritual ideas such as divine femininity, astrology, and ancient Egyptian religious practices, it became an icon for the countercultural ideas of the era. 50 years after the festival, the bus was recreated and presented in the John Wesley Chisolm's documentary The Woodstock Bus.

A diecast model of Hieronimus’s painted Woodstock bus was produced by Sunstar Diecast in 2009 in recognition of Woodstock's 40th anniversary.

== Yellow Submarine ==
In 2002, Hieronimus published Inside the Yellow Submarine: The Making of the Beatles Animated Classic, which has been called "an indispensable companion to the movie." The companion volume It's All in the Mind: Inside The Beatles' Yellow Submarine vol. 2 was published in 2021 with the addition of co-author Laura E. Cortner. His books include interviews with all the principle creators of the original film as well as a symbolic and archetypal analysis of this classic film.

== Negro league baseball ==
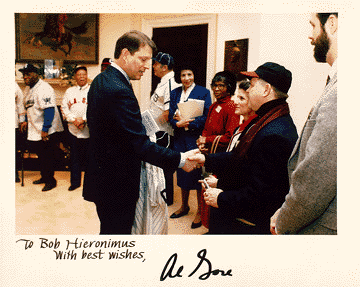
Al Gore greets Hieronimus at the White House.

Robert Hieronimus and Zohara Meyerhoff Hieronimus champion environmental and social causes including supporting the Negro league baseball players who suffered racial discrimination. Hieronimus campaigned for Leon Day's recognition in the 1995 MLB Hall of Fame, featuring Day and other Negro League baseball players on 21st Century Radio. He served on the Negro League Baseball Players Association (NLBPA) Board of Directors, they were instrumental in arranging for representatives of the NLBPA to participate at a lecture and reception for Black History Month in the East Room of The White House.

== Media appearances ==
Hieronimus has been a frequent guest on radio and television talk shows across the country since 1967 sharing his research in metaphysical symbolism, the founding fathers, America's Great Seal, UFOs and the paranormal, and even synchronistic methods for picking winning lottery numbers.

In January 1988 Hieronimus launched 21st Century Radio, first on WFBR in Baltimore, then on over 100 stations nationwide on the American Radio Network and then on WCBM 680 in Baltimore, Maryland USA Sunday nights. He interviewed leading-edge authorities on their unusual findings or opinions. The programming included visits from cultural heroes and icons. In later years, his wife and collaborator, Dr. Zohara Hieronimus, became a regular co-host. 21st Century Radio last aired on live radio in April 2025.
