= Lower Langford =

Village in Somerset, England

Coordinates: 51.34°N 2.782°W

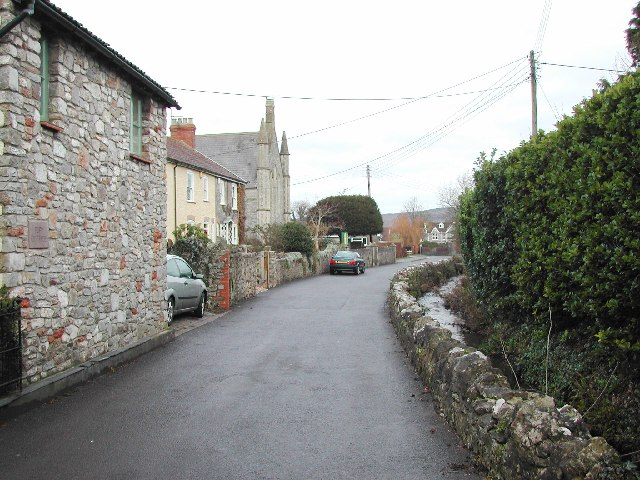
- Lower Langford

- Location within Somerset
- Population: 600
- Civil parish: Churchill
- Unitary authority: North Somerset
- Ceremonial county: Somerset
- Region: South West
- Country: England
- Sovereign state: United Kingdom
- Post town: Bristol
- Postcode district: BS40
- Dialling code: 01934
- Police: Avon and Somerset
- Fire: Avon
- Ambulance: South Western
- UK Parliament: Wells and Mendip Hills

Lower Langford is a village within the civil parishes of Churchill and Burrington in the unitary authority of North Somerset, England. It is located on the western edge of the Mendip Hills about 8 miles (13 kilometres) east of Weston-super-Mare. It was a village built around the estate of Sidney Hill who was the original inhabitant of the village. The estate is now the Bristol Veterinary School of the University of Bristol.

== School ==
Churchill C.E.V.C. Primary School is the primary school serving both Churchill and Langford. It has around 200 pupils ages 4 to 11. The school was newly built in 2002 after relocating from its former location at Ladymead Lane. Churchill Community Foundation School and Sixth Form Centre is the state-run secondary school and specialist Arts College serving the villages of North Somerset. It has around 1,540 students between the ages of 11 and 18 and is located in the adjacent village of Churchill.

== Amenities ==
The village has one pub, The Langford Inn. The village also has a football club, Budgens, hairdresser and had a post office until it closed in May 2010. The village is also served by nearby pubs the Stag and Hounds and the Churchill Inn, Churchill Memorial Hall, and served by the Mendip Vale Medical Practice. Also in the parish are a fish and chip shop, the Winston Manor Hotel and a bed and breakfast, all of which are close to the Churchill-Langford border.

== Churches ==
The village is home to two churches, St Mary's and Langford Evangelical Church. Both churches are fairly small in size. St Mary's is used by the various Christian oriented children's clubs.

St Mary's was built in 1900 on land donated by Sir Lintorn Simmons, G.C.B., G.C.M.G, R.E.

== Landmarks ==
Langford Court was built in 1651 and renovated in the early 19th century and again in 1875. It has been designated as a Grade II listed building. The village is the home of the former Meat Research Institute (now Langford Vets) and the Langford House School of Veterinary Science.
