= Mary White (designer) =

Mary White (born Mary Laidley Mort, in 1912, in Mount Morgan, Queensland, Australia) was a designer and crafts adviser.

In 1932 she married Rupert Vivian White in Sydney.

In 1950 she began her career with Russell Roberts as a freelance designer. A year later she was one of the founding members of the Society of Interior Designers of Australia. In 1954 she opened a shop in Edgecliff, selling custom furniture made from her own drawings.

Commissions include:

- Australian Consolidated Press House in Canberra
- Sydney Morning Herald office
- office of James Fairfax
- Senate conference room at University of Sydney
- Australian Medical Association conference room
- Weston's biscuit factory at Camperdown, and
- A special design for Holden

In 1961 she converted the shop to the Mary White School of Art. The school taught about colour and the skills of an interior decorator. A full design course was offered and public lectures were held in the evenings. For the next two years, to manage the running costs of the school, she worked as a consultant and conducted a series of public lectures on Art History and Modern Art, with H.D. Nicholson and H.G. Kaplan.

From 1962 to 1971 she was the president of the Society of Interior designers of Australia. In 1964 she was a founding member of the Craft Association of New South Wales. Later that same year she was the chair of the steering committee for the Foundation of the Crafts Council of Australia. From 1965 to 1972, she was the state representative to the Australian Society for Education through the Arts.

Between 1967 and 1968, she wrote a series of monthly articles on homes, and her own photographs were used. In 1971, she was also appointed craft adviser on aboriginal projects to the Craft Council. In that same year, she closed her school and moved to Adelaide, to work for the Department of Aboriginal Affairs. In 1976 she was appointed Senior Community Adviser in Dubbo. A year later she retired at age 65 from Commonwealth Public Services and the year after, she visited the Solomon Islands for the World Crafts Council. In 1979 she was part of the South Pacific Commission and that same year she taught with the Aboriginal Land Fund Commission.

White died in 1981 aged 69, and was buried in the Wellington General Cemetery.
