= Thomas Ball Silcock =

British politician (1854–1924)

Thomas Ball Silcock MP, circa 1906

Thomas Ball Silcock (19 September 1854 – 1 April 1924), was a British Liberal Party politician in the radical tradition.

== Background ==
He was born in Bradford on Avon, Wiltshire to Thomas Ball Silcock and Amelia Milsom. He was educated at Bristol Grammar School. He got a BSc. from London University. He married in 1881, Mary Frances Tarrant of Bath. They had three sons and two daughters.

== Career ==
He worked as an architect and surveyor. He was Mayor of Bath from 1900 to 1901 and again from 1910 to 1911. He was a Justice of the Peace. He was elected Liberal MP for the Wells Division of Somerset at the 1906 General Election, gaining the seat from the Conservatives. He was defeated by the Conservatives at the following general election in January 1910. He did not stand for parliament again.

Parliament of the United Kingdom
| Preceded by Robert Edmund Dickinson | Member of Parliament for Wells; 1906–1910 | Succeeded by George John Sandys |
