= Coal hole =

Hatch in the pavement above an underground coal bunker

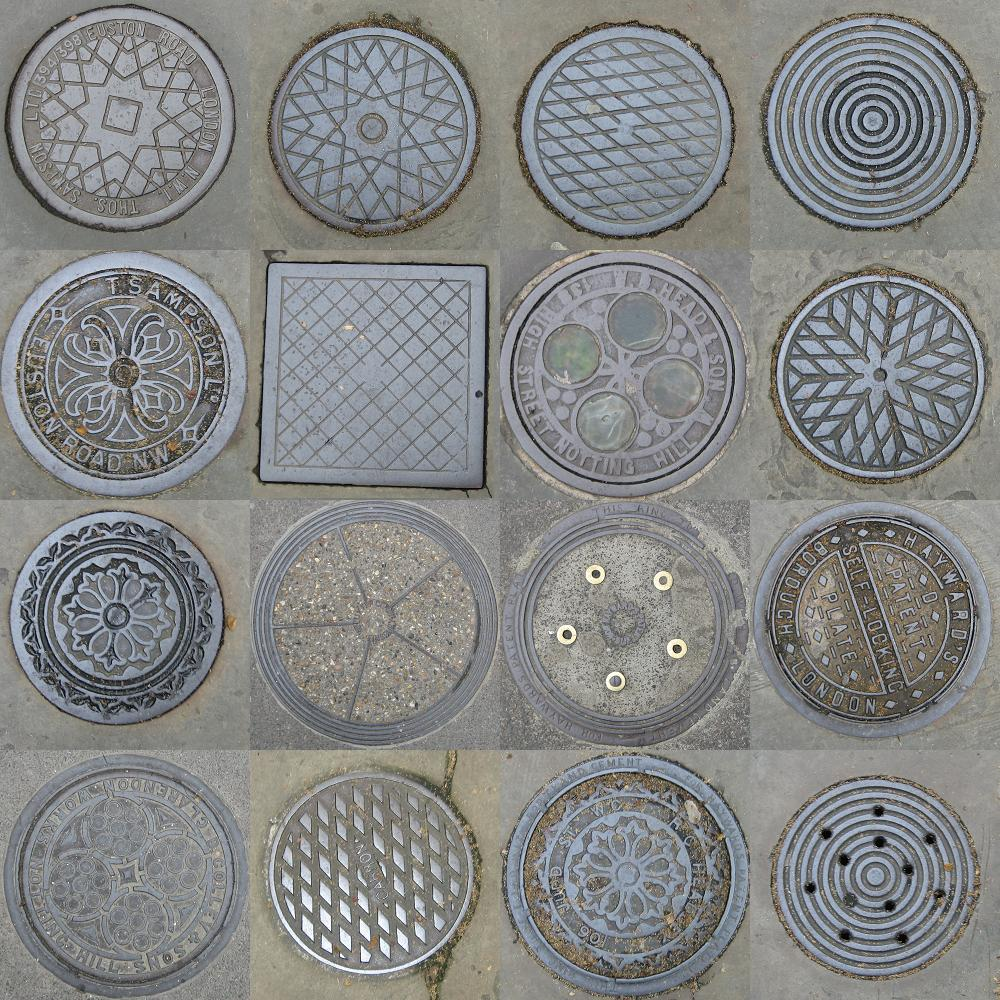
A selection of coal hole covers from Gordon Square, London and surrounding streets

A coal hole is a hatch in the pavement (sidewalk, in US usage) above an underground coal bunker. They are sometimes found outside houses that existed during the period when coal was widely used for domestic heating from the early 19th century to the middle 20th century. In Britain they became largely obsolete in major cities when the Clean Air Act 1956 forced a move toward oil and gas for home heating.

The coal hole allowed the easy delivery of coal into the house's coal bunker, generally in sacks and often from the horse-drawn carts of the coal merchants. The location of the coal hole on the street minimised the distance the sacks needed to be carried and meant that sooty sacks and delivery men need not enter the house.

The hatch is typically about 12 to 14 inches (30 to 35 cm) in diameter and consists of a cast iron ring set into the pavement, with a circular cover, often made of cast iron alone but sometimes containing concrete or glass panes or small ventilation holes. There are three main reasons for the circular shape of the coal hole plate: a circular disc cannot accidentally fall through its own hole (unlike a square or rectangular one); because of its weight, it is helpful that it can be rolled rather than lifted and carried; and the absence of corners allows for a reduced risk of damage to it. Hatches have an internal latch that prevents the cover being lifted from the outside. On some streets there are a variety of types of cover, reflecting the fact that the coal holes were installed at different times by different builders after the houses were constructed.
