= Mary White (textile designer) =

English textile designer (1930–2020)

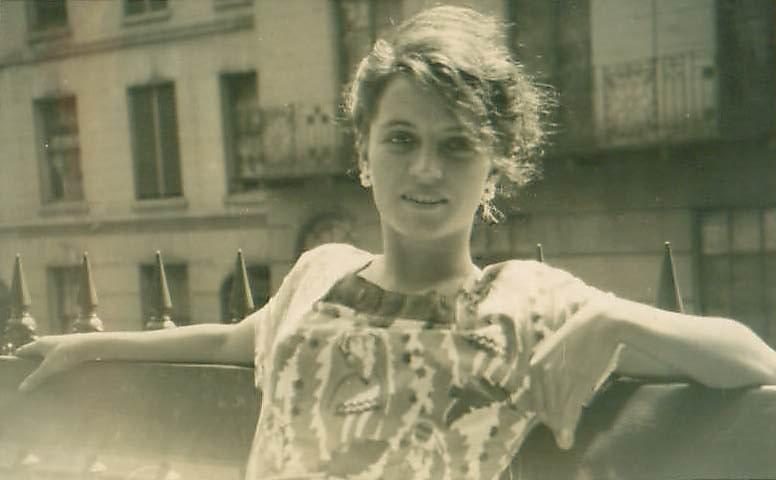
- Mary White in 1947
- Born: 22 January 1930; Margate, Kent, England
- Died: 20 May 2020 (aged 90); Westgate, Kent
- Other name: Mary Dening
- Education: Thanet School of Art and Crafts
- Known for: Textile design and pottery

Mary Lillian White later Mary Dening (22 January 1930 – 20 May 2020) was an English textile designer known for several iconic textile prints of the 1950s. Her designs were very popular and extensively copied in many 1950s homes, as well as in cabins aboard the RMS Queen Mary and at Heathrow Airport. She was also a commercial potter and ceramist, who in the 1960s founded Thanet Pottery, in partnership with her brother David White.

== Biography ==
White was born in 1930, in the town of Margate in Kent. She was trained as a textile designer and studied textile design at the Thanet School of Art and Crafts. She married Claude Irving Dening in January 1951 and often used her married name for commercial work.

=== Textiles ===
Mary White enjoyed a reputation in the 1950s as one of the leading mid-century fabric, textile and pattern designers of the era. She was prolific in her design creation between 1950 until 1957. In the 1950s she worked as a textile designer contracted with the design studio of David Whitehead, which included other designers and artists such as John Barker, Afro Basaldella, Eileen Bell, Gerald Downes, J. Feldman, Barbara Pile, Humphrey Spender, Robert Tierney, Lisa Gronwall and Maj Nilsson. White was designing during the same period as British textile designer, Lucienne Day.

To create her designs White drew on the work of William Morris, images of flowers and of the countryside where she grew up and lived throughout her life. In turn her work has influenced leading fashion designers such as Mary Quant, Laura Ashley and Sir Terence Conran. White created hundreds of designs in her career, some of her most famous creations are Coppice, Cottage Garden and Zinnia which were best sellers in outlets such as Liberty and Heals. The design Cottage Garden was made available by Heals in 1955, at a price of 10s 9d per yard, coming onto the market at a time when a greater number of people than ever were accepting "contemporary" design.

White's Coppice patterned textile print was reproduced as a rug and sold in John Lewis as recently as 2010.

Examples of White's designs are held by several British museums including the Victoria and Albert Museum in London, the Warner Textile Archive in Essex and the Whitworth Art Gallery in Manchester. White's textiles were used on the RMS Queen Mary ocean liner and, as curtains and coverings, at Heathrow Airport. White's design work is included in books on the subject of 1950s textile design, such as 20th Century Pattern Design (2002) by Lesley Jackson.

=== Pottery ===
White was also involved in Thanet Pottery, having also studied pottery at Thanet School of Art and Crafts. Thanet Pottery was a collaboration between White (then using her married name of Dening) and her brother, David White. Thanet Pottery made hand painted slip cast earthenware pottery and their items were sold to High Street chains in the early 1960s.

Mary White was interviewed and included in the BBC One show The 1952 Show, Episode 2 which aired on 27 March 2012.
