= Wilding =

Wilding may refer to:

== People ==
- Alexa Wilding (c. 1847 – 1884), one of the favourite models of the Pre-Raphaelite artist Dante Gabriel Rossetti
- Anthony Wilding (1883–1915), New Zealand world No. 1 tennis player and soldier
- Cora Wilding (1888–1982), New Zealand physiotherapist and artist
- Faith Wilding (born 1943), Paraguayan American multidisciplinary artist
- George Wilding, director of the UW Carbone Cancer Center
- Mark Wilding, American television producer and screenwriter

=== Britain ===
- Alison Wilding (born 1948), English artist
- Barbara Wilding (born 1950), British retired senior police officer
- Craig Wilding (born 1981), English former professional footballer
- Dorothy Wilding (1893–1976), English professional portrait photographer
- Michael Wilding (1912–1979), English stage, television, and film actor
- Michael Wilding (writer) (born 1942), British-born writer and academic
- Peter Wilding (born 1968), former professional footballer
- Rav Wilding (born 1977), British television presenter and former police officer
- Richard Wilding (born 1965), British academic and business professional

== Media ==
- Coral and Jason Wilding, characters from the British soap opera Family Affairs
- Matt Wilding, character from the British television drama series Waterloo Road
- Wilding: The Return of Nature to a British Farm, a 2018 non-fiction book on nature conservation
- Wilding (film), a British documentary film

== Other ==
- Wilding, a misinterpreted description of suspects' actions in the 1989 Central Park jogger case
- Wilding conifer, invasive trees in the high country of New Zealand
- Wilding series, a series of definitive postage and revenue stamps
- Wilding (1788 ship)
- Wildings, former retail company with its main department store based in Newport, Wales

== See also ==
- Rewilding (disambiguation)
