= All Saints Church, Sandford =

Church in Somerset, England

All Saints Church
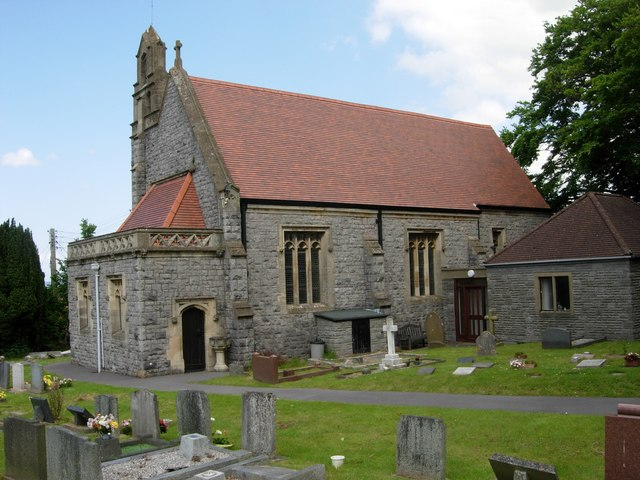

Religion
- Affiliation: Church of England
- Ecclesiastical or organizational status: Active
- Year consecrated: 1884

Location
- Location: Sandford, Somerset, England
- Interactive map of All Saints Church
- Coordinates: 51.3323°N 2.8313°W

Architecture
- Architects: Hans Price and William Wooler
- Type: Church

All Saints Church is a Church of England church in Sandford, Somerset, England. Designed by Hans Price and William Wooler, it was built in 1883–84 and has been a Grade II listed building since 1983. Today the church is in a local ecumenical partnership with Sandford Methodist Church.

== History ==
All Saints was built as a chapel of ease to the parish church of St James in Winscombe. Plans for the establishment of a church at Sandford originated with the offer of a plot of land by the Dean and Chapter of Wells, but it was not until 1882 that fundraising began through the efforts of the vicar of Winscombe, Rev. R. F. Follett, and others. A circular was issued in February 1882 detailing the need for a church and resident clergyman at Sandford. At the time, the hamlet and its surrounding area had a population of over 400, with most inhabitants being two to three miles from the parish church.

A committee was formed, made up of the vicar and churchwardens of Winscombe, the Rev. Prebendary Stephenson (rural dean), Mr. Poole of Underhill Farm and Mr. Reece of Winscombe. The appeal, which aimed to raise £1,000, was successful in generating funds by public subscription, with major donors including Mr. Sidney Hall of Langford House, Mrs. A. G. Lethbridge and Rev. J. A. Yatman. A grant was also received from the Incorporated Church Building Society.

The plans for the church, drawn up by Messrs Price and Wooler of Weston-super-Mare, were approved in December 1882, and Mr. James Wilcox of Weston-super-Mare was hired as the building contractor in February 1883. Construction commenced soon after and the church was consecrated on 10 January 1884 by the Bishop of Bath and Wells, the Right Rev. Lord Arthur Hervey. The church cost an approximate £1,100 to build, £850 of which had been raised by the time of its consecration.

== Architecture ==
All Saints is built of local stone, with dressings in Bath stone and plain tiles on the roof, in the Perpendicular style. It was designed for 100 persons and made up of a two-bay nave, chancel, vestry and west porch. A bellcote tower is located on the west side of the building. Many of the original fittings are of polished pitch pine, except the doors of oak and the wagon roof of stained red Baltic timber. The flooring is all of timber, except the aisle and chancel floor which are laid with tiles. The church's furniture was gifted by Rev. P. Willis, late curate of Axbridge. The carved work was carried out by Harry Hems of Exeter and the ornamental glass windows supplied by Messrs Joseph Bell of Bristol.
