= University of Wisconsin Carbone Cancer Center =

US cancer research center

- Industry: Healthcare
- Genre: Healthcare
- Headquarters: Madison, Wisconsin, USA
- Area served: Wisconsin
- Key people: Howard Bailey, Director
- Parent: UW Health
- Website: www.cancer.wisc.edu

The University of Wisconsin Carbone Cancer Center (UWCCC) is a comprehensive cancer center in Wisconsin, as designated by the National Cancer Institute (NCI), the lead federal agency for cancer research. It is an integral part of both the University of Wisconsin (UW) and the University of Wisconsin Hospital and Clinics. It is located in Madison, Wisconsin.

== History ==
Cancer research on the University of Wisconsin-Madison campus has a history starting with the McArdle Laboratory for Cancer Research, established in 1940. Harold Rusch served as the first director of the McArdle Laboratory until 1972.

After the National Cancer Act of 1971, Rusch submitted a proposal to create a new comprehensive cancer center at the University of Wisconsin. The resulting Clinical Cancer Center was one of six original NCI-designated comprehensive cancer centers and was awarded NCI designation in 1973.

Paul Carbone was recruited from the NCI in 1975 to lead the UW's Division of Clinical Oncology, and after Rusch's retirement in 1978, Carbone was named the Director of the Comprehensive Cancer Center. Carbone led the UW Comprehensive Cancer Center from 1978 to 1997 through a period of exceptional scientific and clinical growth while promoting further interdisciplinary science through collaborations across departments.

John Niederhuber served as UW Comprehensive Cancer Center director from 1997 to 2002. His most notable accomplishment was the consolidation of NCI cancer center support grants for the McArdle Laboratory for Cancer Research and the University of Wisconsin Comprehensive Cancer Center. This consolidation led to one NCI-designated grant on the UW-Madison campus. Niederhuber went on to become director of the National Cancer Institute, serving from 2006 to 2010.

Following Niederhuber's departure, George Wilding served as interim director before being named director in January 2004. Wilding guided the UW Comprehensive Cancer Center through tremendous growth from 2004 to 2013, which included over 30 tenured faculty recruitments and $250 million in cancer funding, and an emphasis on transdisciplinary research that fostered changes in the management structure, physical growth of facilities and overall multidisciplinary approach.

In 2006, the Cancer Center was renamed the University of Wisconsin Carbone Cancer Center (UW Carbone) to honor the legacy of Paul Carbone.

In September 2013, Howard Bailey became interim director of UW Carbone. Bailey has been a faculty member since 1994, with near continuous peer reviewed funding, and a member of the NCI subcommittee A ("Parent Committee") for Core Grant review since 2012.

Howard Bailey was appointed Director in April 2015.

UW Carbone space is now approaching a three-fold increase to approximately 389,000 square feet of contiguous space on the west end of campus, and the administrative and scientific leadership structure has been considerably strengthened through the addition of Associate and Assistant Director roles. Clinical services have grown with continued expansion of clinical facilities, staff and organizational structure.

== Organization, research, and outreach ==
UW Carbone is a matrix cancer center, allowing it to extend its influence through multiple departments and schools on the University of Wisconsin-Madison campus. UW Carbone unites physicians and scientists who work together in translating discoveries from research laboratories into new treatments that benefit cancer patients; the center conducts research, provides treatment and offers training. The center engages with more than 2,300 UW faculty and staff across the UW campus and treats more than 30,000 patients per year.

UW Carbone formed the Wisconsin Oncology Network, a regional network to allow community health centers from throughout Wisconsin and northern Illinois to enroll patients in select cancer clinical trials that are open at UW Carbone.

=== Research areas ===
Organized around six scientific programs. UW Carbone programs encompass laboratory research, clinical research, population sciences and advanced research training:

- Developmental Therapeutics: Discovering new targets and therapeutic agents and moving them into clinical trials.
- Cancer Genetic and Epigenetic Mechanisms: Discovering novel cancer genetic and epigenetic mechanisms and translating mechanistic insights derived principally from mouse models and primary human cancer samples to human cancer patients.
- Human Cancer Virology: Researching the viruses that cause 15 to 20 percent of all human cancers, including the viral gene functions that are required both for tumor development and also for continued survival of malignant cells in the final tumor.
- Imaging and Radiation Sciences: Pursuing basic, translational and clinical research involving ionizing and non-ionizing radiation in the diagnosis, staging, and treatment of cancer.
- Cancer Prevention and Control: Identifying effective approaches to reduce the burden of cancer for patients, their families, and communities through improved prevention, early detection, and survival.
- Tumor Microenvironment: Studying cancer cell interactions within the context of their local environment.
