= Fannie B. Linderman =

English-born American teacher, entertainer and writer (1875-1960)

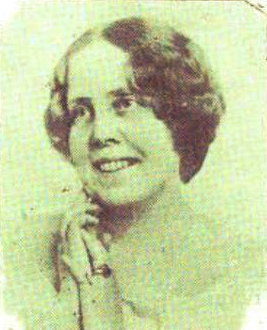
- Born: Fannie Beatrice Fry; August 1875; Winscombe, Somerset, England
- Died: October 9, 1960 (aged 85); Rockford, Illinois, U.S.
- Other names: Lady Lind; Poet of the Commonplace
- Occupations: educator; entertainer; writer
- Spouses: William Cordova Linderman (m. 1891; died 1936); Benjamin Harling (m. 1943; died 1946)
- Children: 1

Signature
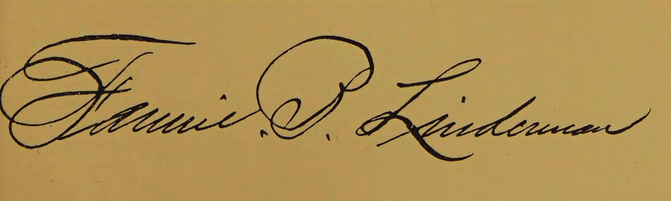

Fannie B. Linderman (née, Fry; after first marriage, Linderman; after second marriage, Harling; pen name, Lady Lind; August 1875 – October 9, 1960) was a British-born American teacher of dramatic arts, an entertainer, and a writer. She was a member of the faculty of Chicago Musical College, Department of Dramatic Art, and for 17 years, served as the school's dean of women. She also conducted a studio where dramatic art and public speaking courses were given. Known as the "Poet of the Commonplace" and described as an artist-teacher and an author-reader, she made a reputation as a reader of her own compositions.

== Early life and education ==
Fannie Beatrice Fry was born in Winscombe, Somerset, England, (Note: According to her obituary in the Belvidere Daily Republican (1960), Fannie was born in Summerset Shire, England.) August 1875. She was the daughter of Robert and Susanna Tripp Fry. Susanna was a direct descendant of Henry VIII. Robert was wealthy and Fannie's first nine years were spent in luxury. When she was nine, the family emigrated to the U.S., the father having been caught in the maelstrom of financial disaster. They settled near Belvidere, Illinois. Existence on the Illinois farm was very different from the life in England; it was a struggle. At home, it usually devolved upon Fannie to keep the family circle from becoming too serious.

In the small country school which she attended, Fannie was the ring-leader in every sport.

== Career ==
On December 12, 1891, in Boone County, Illinois, she married William Cordova Linderman, a highly educated man. The young wife took on the responsibilities of a house on a big farm. She hated housework, farm life and all that it entailed. But, utilizing her knowledge of English landscape gardening, she beautified the immediate surrounding. While she worked in the kitchen, she made herself memorize a poem or some inspiring quotation pinned upon the wall. One day, she saw a copy of Bartolomé Esteban Murillo's The Angels' Kitchen, which made her understand that it was not what we do in life, but how we do it that counts.

The couple's daughter, Vivian Willard Linderman, was born in December 1892. The baby became Mrs. Linderman's greatest inspiration toward striving for higher education, travel, and study.

Although she placed home life above all else, Linderman became a student-traveler, visiting the leading art and literary centers of Europe. On one of these trips abroad, she found herself in Paris at the Louvre, and there saw for the first time the original of Murillo's The Angels' Kitchen. Flooded with memories of her early years as a housewife, Linderman purchased a copy of this picture, and hung it in her kitchen back home as a constant reminder that the dignity of all labor consists in your attitude. Linderman studied art and literature in England, France, Italy, and Germany, and finished with Shakespearean study at Stratford. With a gift for writing, she began to make up verse. A deep-seated desire to make closer contact with an audience led her to become a reader, entertainer, and lecturer.

The daughter, Vivian, became an artist, musician and composer, earning the degree of Doctor of Music in the Chicago Musical College. After Vivian's marriage in 1917, and removal to Washington, D.C., Mrs. Linderman became busy writing, lecturing, and giving recitals. She joined the faculty of the Chicago Musical College as Director of Public Speaking, Psychology and Self-development; she also served as dean of women.

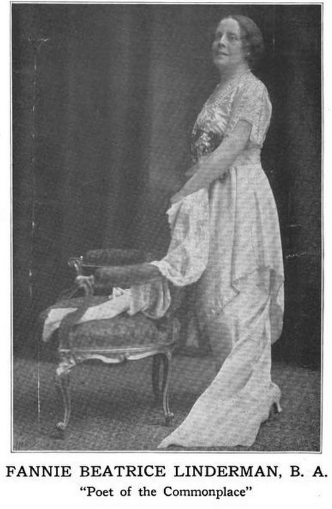
(undated)

Around 1922, Linderman opened a studio in Kimball Building, and her copy of The Angels in the Kitchen hung on the studio's wall. She taught poetical reading, fluency of speech, vocabulary building, and platform speaking. Linderman's public programs included Shakespearean plays, Bible readings, pianologues, book reviews, and cuttings from modern plays.

Linderman possessed a diversified style of writing in prose and verse. In her book, The Home of the Purple Flower, she told the story of her beautiful garden. To the Parkway hotel was published in 1922 using the pen name, "Lady Lind". Called "The Poet of the Common Place", she published a volume of poems, Through The Years (1952). Many of her poems appeared in the American Poetry and in other magazines. The poems, "They That Go Down To The Sea In Ships" and "Deep Calleth Unto Deep" were included in Anthology of American Poetry. She also was the author of Personality; The Debt That Art Owes to Religion; Pilgrimages to the Homes of the Great, and of textbooks on dramatic art.

Linderman was a member of Poetry Lovers of America; Illinois Woman's Press Association; Allied Arts of Chicago; Rockford Mendelssohn Club; and she served as vice-president of The Literary Association of America, of which the American Poetry Magazine was the official organ.

== Personal life ==
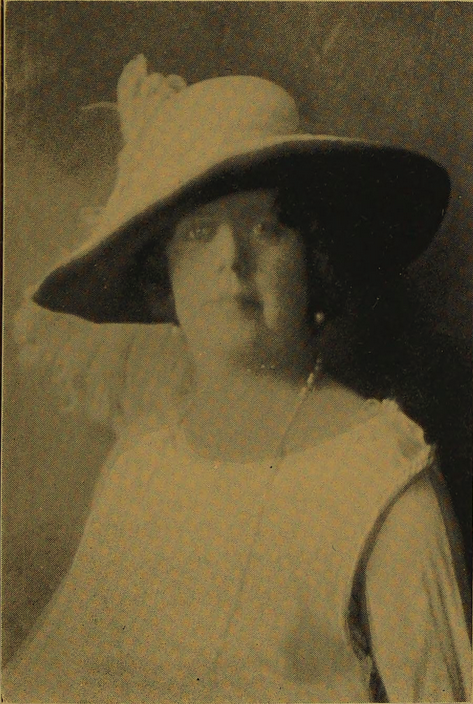
(undated)

Mr. Linderman died in 1936. On April 28, 1943, she married Benjamin Harling (1869-1946) in Belvidere, Illinois.

When free from professional duties, Linderman spent time at her country home, "Lilac Lodge", in Marengo, Illinois. Surrounded by beautiful grounds, which showed her skill in English landscape gardening; this retreat became a place for rest.

In religion, she affiliated with the Presbyterian church.

Fannie B. Linderman died at Swedish American Hospital in Rockford, Illinois, October 9, 1960.

== Awards and honors ==
- 1946, member, Chicago chapter, American Academy of Arts and Letters

== Selected works ==
=== Books ===
- The Home of the Purple Flower
- Personality; The Debt That Art Owes to Religion
- Pilgrimages to the Homes of the Great
- To the Parkway hotel, 1922

=== Poetry collections ===
- Through The Years, 1952

=== Poems ===
- "They That Go Down To The Sea In Ships"
- "Deep Calleth Unto Deep"
