= Mahua Dey =

American neurosurgeon and brain tumor immunotherapy researcher

- Born: Dehradun, India
- Known for: Research on personalized vaccines and immunotherapies for glioblastoma
- Scientific career
- Fields: Neurosurgery, Neuro-oncology, Cancer immunotherapy
- Workplaces: University of Wisconsin School of Medicine and Public Health; UW Health Carbone Cancer Center

Mahua Dey is an American neurosurgeon and academic. She is associate professor of neurological surgery and director of the surgical neuro-oncology program at the University of Wisconsin School of Medicine and Public Health. Her research focuses on developing immunotherapies and personalized therapeutic vaccines for malignant brain tumors, particularly glioblastoma.

== Early life and education ==
Dey grew up in Dehradun, India. She earned a B.A. (Hons.) in Economics from Jadavpur University in Kolkata in 1998. She immigrated to the United States in 1999. She subsequently earned a B.S. in economics, summa cum laude, from the University of Houston in 2003 and her M.D. from Baylor College of Medicine in Houston, Texas, in 2007.

== Career ==
Dey completed her neurosurgery residency and a postdoctoral fellowship in neuro-oncology at the University of Chicago Medical Center. She previously practiced as a surgical neuro-oncologist at Indiana University School of Medicine and Goodman Campbell Brain and Spine.

She is board-certified in neurological surgery and specializes in the surgical management of benign and malignant brain and spinal cord tumors, including tumors in eloquent brain regions that require awake functional mapping. At UW-Madison she directs the surgical neuro-oncology program while leading a translational research laboratory focused on brain tumor immunology.

== Research ==
Dey leads a translational laboratory investigating immune responses to primary and metastatic malignant brain cancers. Her work centers on developing personalized therapeutic vaccines and other immunotherapies for glioblastoma.

A key project involves a personalized, gene-modified tumor vaccine (GIFT-7 fusokine approach) created from a patient's own glioblastoma cells. In preclinical mouse models, the vaccine has shown a 100% tumor response rate and induced lasting immunological memory that protects against tumor rechallenge. The research is advancing toward early-phase clinical trials, including preparation of an Investigational New Drug application to the U.S. Food and Drug Administration.

Progress toward human trials faces potential delays from federal funding uncertainties that affect NIH-supported laboratory infrastructure and regulatory processes. The laboratory also develops biomarkers for real-time treatment monitoring and explores multimodal strategies that combine vaccines with standard therapies.

Her publications have been cited more than 5,900 times.

== Awards and honors ==
- Nominated for the Wisconsin Alumni Research Foundation (WARF) Innovation Award in 2023 for development of a personalized therapeutic vaccine for glioblastoma.
- Recipient of the K12 Neurosurgery Research Career Development Award from the National Institute of Neurological Disorders and Stroke (NINDS).

== Selected publications ==
- Chang, Alan L.; Miska, Jason; Wainwright, Derek A.; Dey, Mahua; et al. (2016). "CCL2 produced by the glioma microenvironment is essential for the recruitment of regulatory T cells and myeloid-derived suppressor cells". Cancer Research. 76 (19): 5671–5682. doi:10.1158/0008-5472.CAN-16-0144. PMC 5050119. PMID 27530322.
- Wainwright, Derek A.; Chang, Alan L.; Dey, Mahua; et al. (2014). "Durable therapeutic efficacy utilizing combinatorial blockade against IDO, CTLA-4, and PD-L1 in mice with brain tumors". Clinical Cancer Research. 20 (20): 5290–5301. doi:10.1158/1078-0432.CCR-14-0514. PMC 4182350. PMID 24691018.
- Auffinger, Brenda; Tobias, Adam L.; Han, Yu; Lee, Gina; Guo, Dongmei; Dey, Mahua; et al. (2014). "Conversion of differentiated cancer cells into cancer stem-like cells in a glioblastoma model after primary chemotherapy". Cell Death & Differentiation. 21 (7): 1119–1131. doi:10.1038/cdd.2014.31. PMC 4207480.
- Filley, Anna C.; Henriquez, Mario; Dey, Mahua (2017). "Recurrent glioma clinical trial, CheckMate-143: the game is not over yet". Oncotarget. 8 (53): 91779–91794. doi:10.18632/oncotarget.21586. PMC 5710964.
