= Sandford, Somerset =

Village in Somerset, England

Coordinates: 51.3317°N 2.8267°W

Sandford
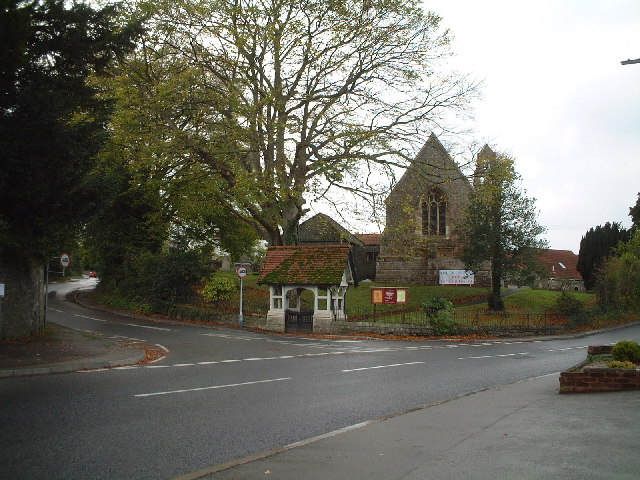
- All Saints Church

- Location within Somerset
- OS grid reference: ST425595
- Civil parish: Winscombe and Sandford
- Unitary authority: North Somerset
- Ceremonial county: Somerset
- Region: South West
- Country: England
- Sovereign state: United Kingdom
- Post town: WINSCOMBE
- Postcode district: BS25
- Dialling code: 01934
- Police: Avon and Somerset
- Fire: Avon
- Ambulance: South Western
- UK Parliament: Wells and Mendip Hills

Sandford is a village between Churchill and Banwell on the A368 in North Somerset, England.

The Parish of Winscombe and Sandford, centred on the Parish Church of Saint James, includes the villages of Barton, Oakridge, Sandford, Sidcot and Woodborough.

The Sandford Parish Church of All Saints was built in 1883–85 by Hans Price, and is a Grade II listed building. It was constructed as a Chapel of ease to St James the Great in Winscombe.

It is believed the name Sandford means 'The sand ford' from the Old English sand and ford.

Sandford is home to one of the region's main cider producers, Thatchers Cider.

Sandford once had its own railway station on the Cheddar Valley line, which ran from Yatton to Wells. The now-disused station is a Grade II listed building. It is the subject of some controversy in the village as developers submit plans for its redevelopment.

The Railway Inn is the only public house in Sandford.
