= UW Med Flight =

Air ambulance service

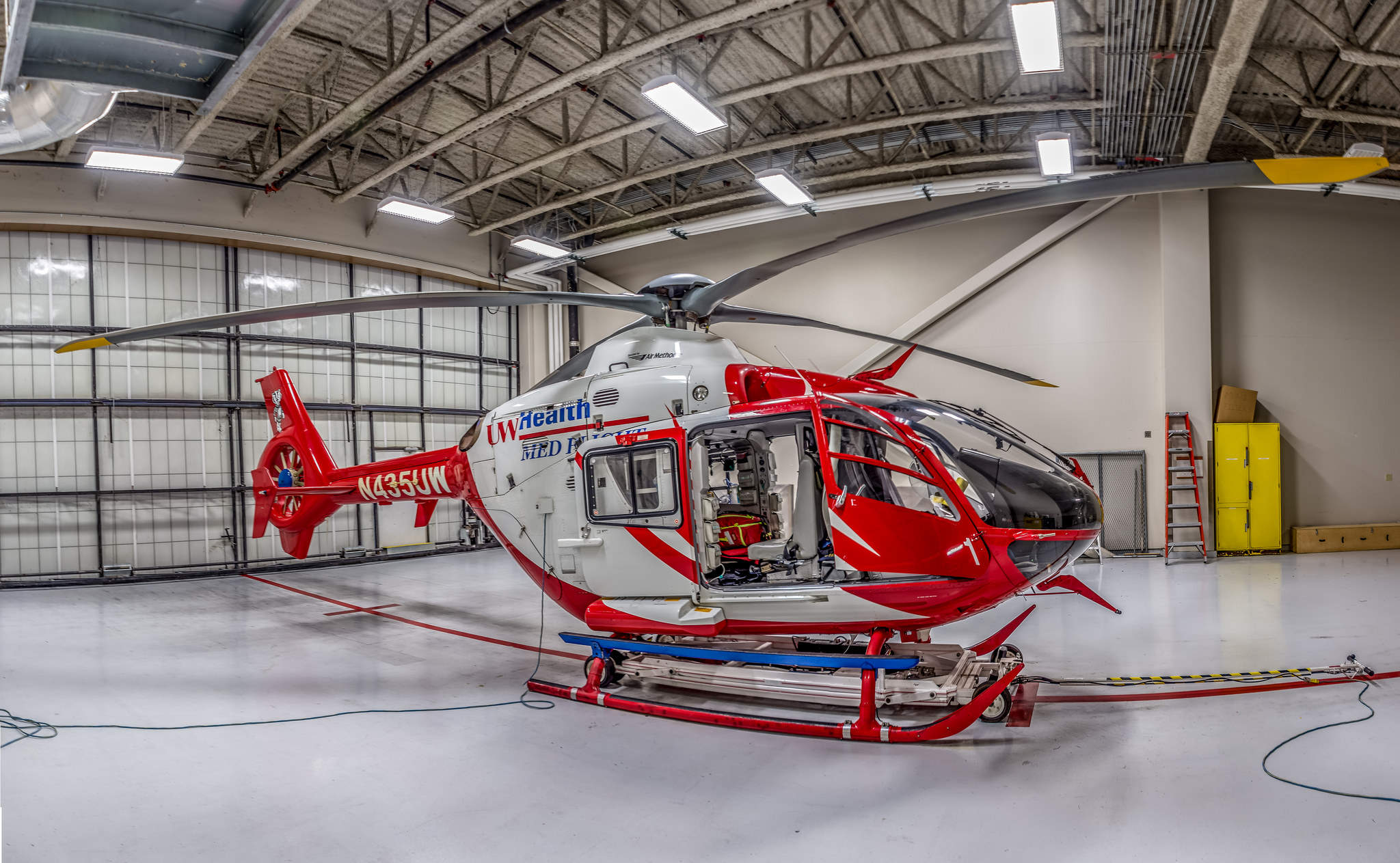
Med Flight in Hangar at University Hospital. P Rankin.

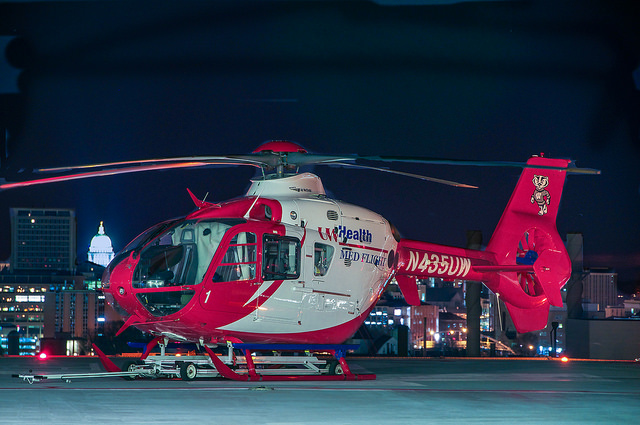
Med Flight on the pad at University Hospital. P Rankin

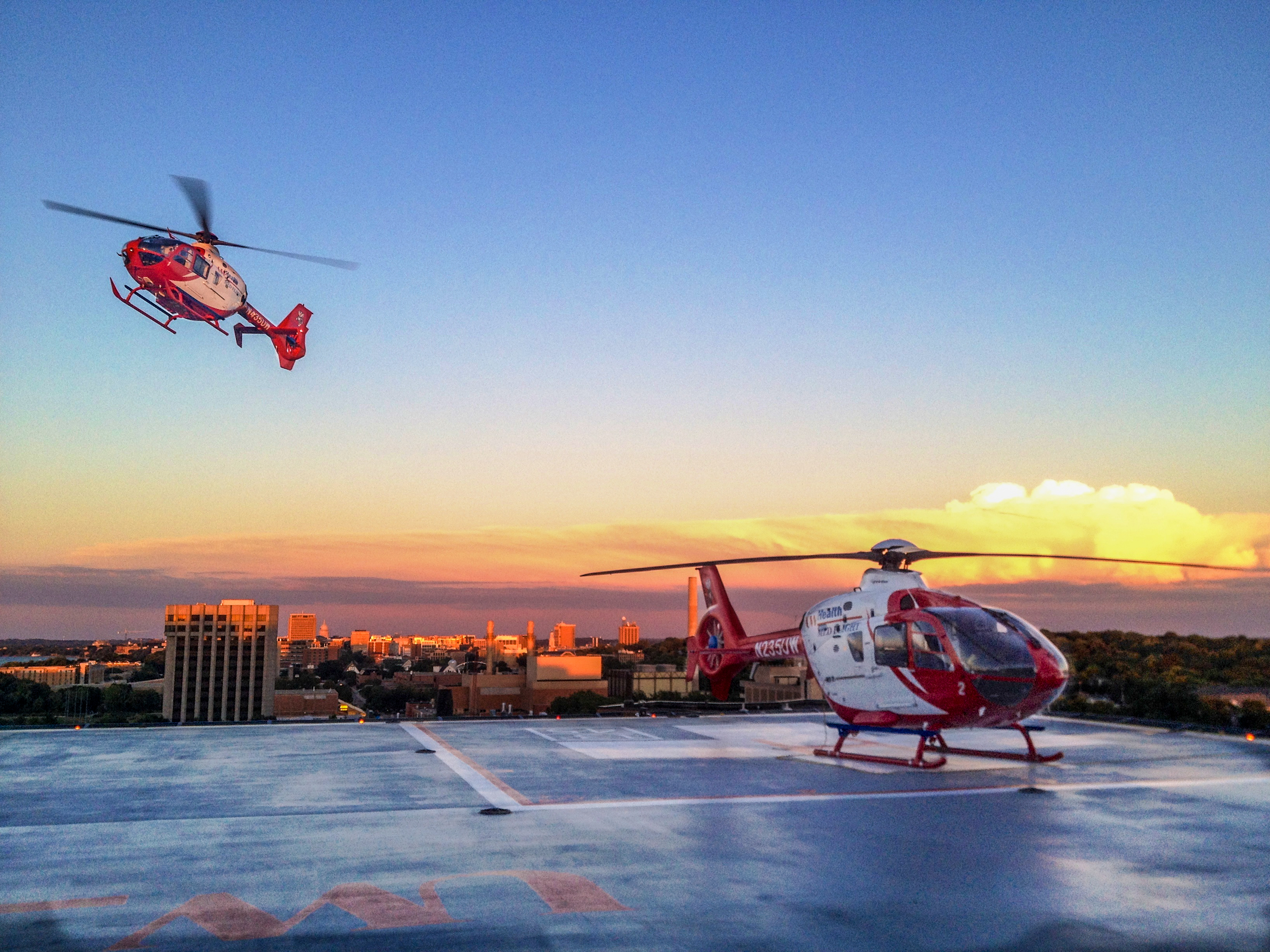
UW Med 1 and 2 at University Hospital. P Rankin

UW Health Med Flight is an air ambulance service based at University of Wisconsin Hospital in Madison, Wisconsin, US. Med Flight was established in 1985, and as of 2025 operates from bases in Madison, Mineral Point, Janesville, and Portage.

== History ==
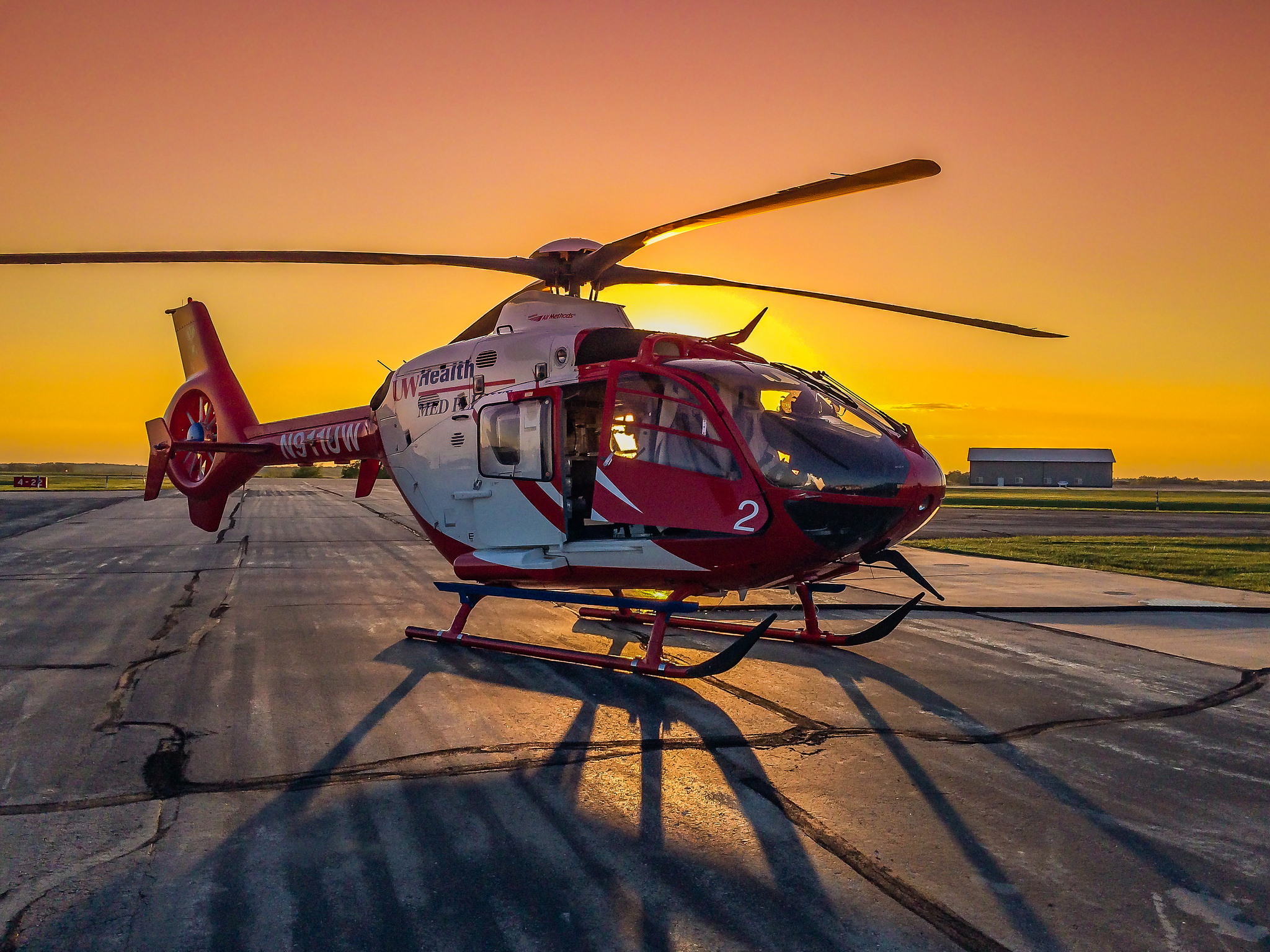
UW Med Flight 2 At Iowa County base. P Rankin

The first operational flight was in April 1985 and carried a heart attack patient from Coloma, Wisconsin who survived. The initial staff was three doctors, six nurses, three pilots and one mechanic. There was no aircraft hangar and maintenance on the aircraft was performed outside with a helipad in the parking lot. There was also some controversy in nearby Shorewood Hills, Wisconsin over noise from the helicopter. 20 years later, it was staffed by a rotating crew of 23 doctors, 12 nurses, eight communications specialists and six pilots and had three helicopters and a ground ambulance. In 2005, an $8 million project created a heliport on the 8th floor rooftop of the hospital replacing the parking lot landing pad and created larger hangars to support three aircraft. The ambulance was added in 2004 for inter-hospital transports to reduce costs and free a helicopter for emergency transports.

== Fleet ==
Since 2020, the Med Flight fleet consists of two Airbus EC 145 helicopters and one EC 135 helicopter operated by Metro Aviation. In 2014, the Med Flight fleet included two Eurocopter EC 135 helicopters, N911UW and N435UW. N435UW replaced N135UW, which was destroyed in a fatal crash on May 10, 2008. N911UW replaced N235UW in October 2014 as a part of an upgrade to standardize the interior layout of the two helicopters. In July 2007 the EC 135 helicopters, costing $4 million each and currently operated and maintained by Air Methods, replaced two Agusta A109E 'Power' helicopters, two of which were N1UW and N12UW, operated and maintained by CJ Systems Aviation Group.

== Incidents ==
One of the Agusta aircraft was forced to make a precautionary landing in a field in the town of Rutland, Wisconsin on Friday July 28, 2006, after an equipment warning light activated.

On May 10, 2008, helicopter N135UW, known as Med Flight 1, crashed near La Crosse, Wisconsin, fatally injuring all three crew members. Initial reports indicated that the helicopter "may have flown into a hill and or struck some trees." Impact debris and rotor blade fragments were found near the top of the 1,160 feet elevation ridgeline about 4.5 miles south of La Crosse Airport. Main debris was located 600 feet below that point around 930 feet elevation. La Crosse Municipal Airport field elevation is 654 feet. On September 3, 2010, the NTSB released its report, finding that the probable cause of the accident was, "The pilot's failure to maintain clearance from trees along the top of a ridgeline due to inadequate preflight planning, insufficient altitude, and the lack of a helicopter terrain awareness and warning system."
