= Lake–Peterson House =

Historic house in Illinois, United States

- Lake-Peterson House
- U.S. National Register of Historic Places

- Location within Illinois Location within the United States
- Interactive map showing the location of Lake-Petersen House
- Location: 1313 E. State St., Rockford, Illinois
- Coordinates: 42°15′59″N 89°4′30″W
- Area: less than one acre
- Built: 1873
- Built by: John Lake
- Architectural style: Victorian Gothic Revival
- NRHP reference No.: 80001424
- Added to NRHP: June 25, 1980

The Lake–Peterson House, also known as Jenny's, is a Victorian Gothic Revival home in Rockford, Illinois, United States. The house was built in 1873, probably by prominent Rockford citizen John Lake - its first owner, but its architect is unknown. The house is a significant example of Gothic Revival architecture and is considered one of the finest such homes in the U.S. state of Illinois. The Lake–Peterson House is owned and maintained by Swedish American Hospital in Rockford and stands adjacent to the main hospital complex along Business US 20 (East State Street). The building and its carriage house were added to the U.S. National Register of Historic Places in 1980.

== History ==
The Lake–Peterson House was built in 1873, most likely by its first owner, John Lake and stands in front of the main complex for Rockford's Swedish American Hospital along Business U.S. Route 20. Lake was an early and prominent citizen of Rockford as a party to partnerships in the lumber trade. He came to Rockford in 1837 and by the 1870s was one of the city's most important and wealthy citizens. Lake lived in the house until he died in 1907. In 1918 the house was purchased by Pehr August Peterson, a figure in the Rockford furniture industry.

Peterson came to Rockford in 1852 among the first wave of Swedish immigrants and in 1876 was named secretary of the Union Furniture Company. By 1892 Peterson directed 7 of the 20 furniture companies in Rockford; at the time, Rockford was surpassed only by Chicago and Grand Rapids concerning furniture manufacture. When Peterson died in 1927 he was president of more than 12 industrial companies. Peterson, a philanthropist, donated the Lake–Peterson House to the Swedish American Hospital in 1919, provided he and his wife be allowed to remain in it until they died. Peterson's wife died in 1964 and the house became a residence for the hospital's School of Medical Technology. In 1973 a volunteer organization from the hospital, the Jenny Lind Society, undertook preservation of the house.

== Architecture ==
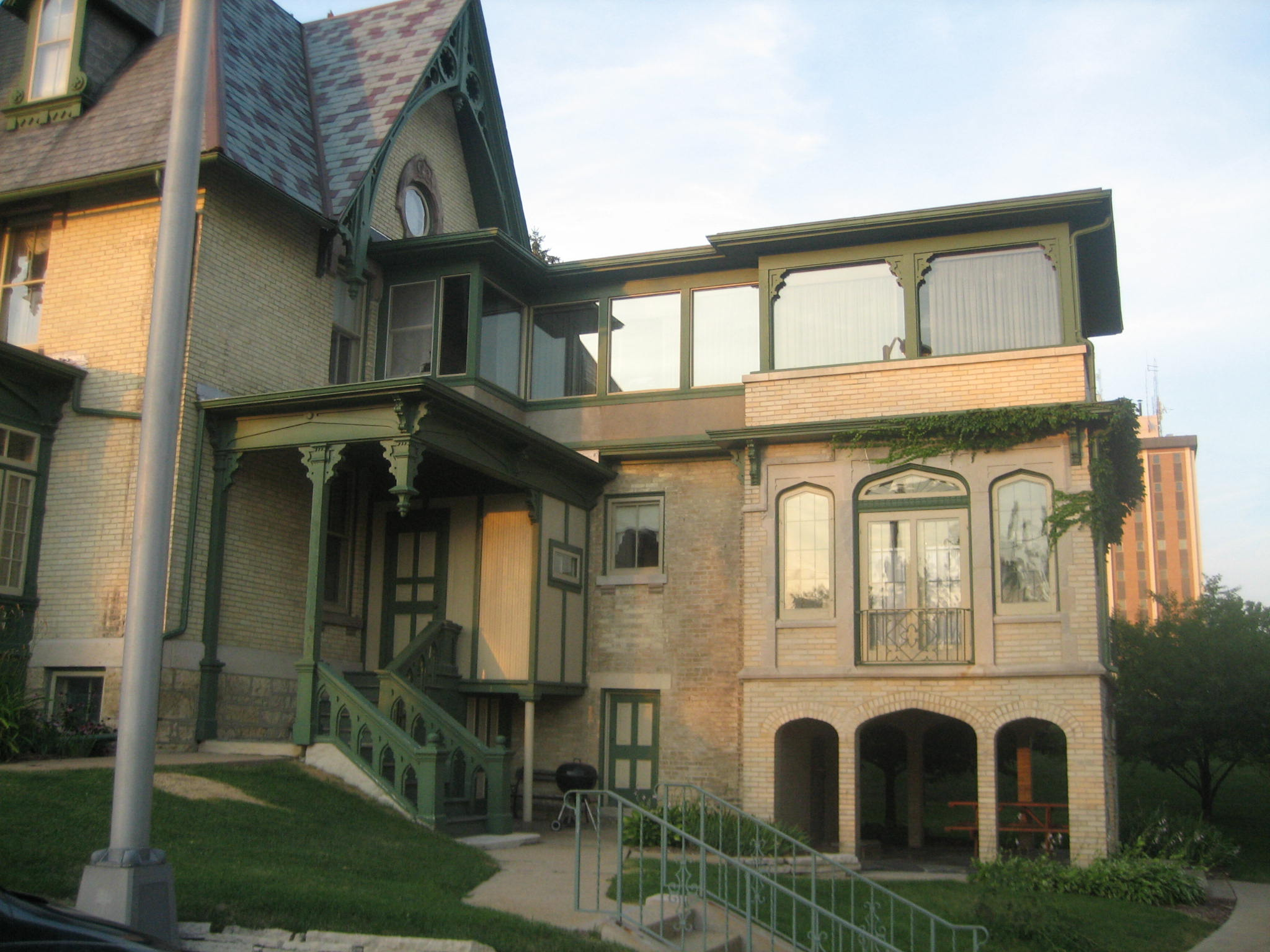
The three-story porch was a post-1918 addition to the house.

The Lake–Peterson House is one of the U.S. state of Illinois' finest examples of Gothic Revival architecture, specifically Victorian Gothic. The asymmetrical two-story residence is constructed of yellow brick and sits upon a stone foundation. Its steeply pitched roof is clad in slate tiles and each of the four sides of the original home features a decorative gable. The house also features tall brick chimneys with corbelled chimney caps, dormers, bay windows and a large veranda. The architect, if there was one, is unknown, though it is probable that Lake himself was the builder. One possibility is that John Lake obtained the architectural plans in England, his native land, where he had returned from as construction on the house began in 1873.

This example of Gothic Revival architecture is particularly noteworthy for its exterior trim details. Typically, the gable ends, at the edges, feature curvilinear (or gingerbread-type) vergeboards in residential Gothic Revival styled buildings. The Lake–Peterson House has simple pointed arches with ornamented pendants. The windows are also somewhat unusual in their variety. Three of the home's four sides have bay windows and other windows are topped by limestone hood molds. The windows themselves show differing forms as well, including the double-hung sash windows on the second floor and the diamond-paned windows with colored glass in the sitting room.

Sometime after 1918 the Lake–Peterson House underwent its only major alterations. An addition was added to the southeast portion of the home, it features a smooth stone finish and window groupings characteristic of late period Gothic Revival. At around the same time, a three-story enclosed porch was added to the same area of the house.

== Carriage house ==
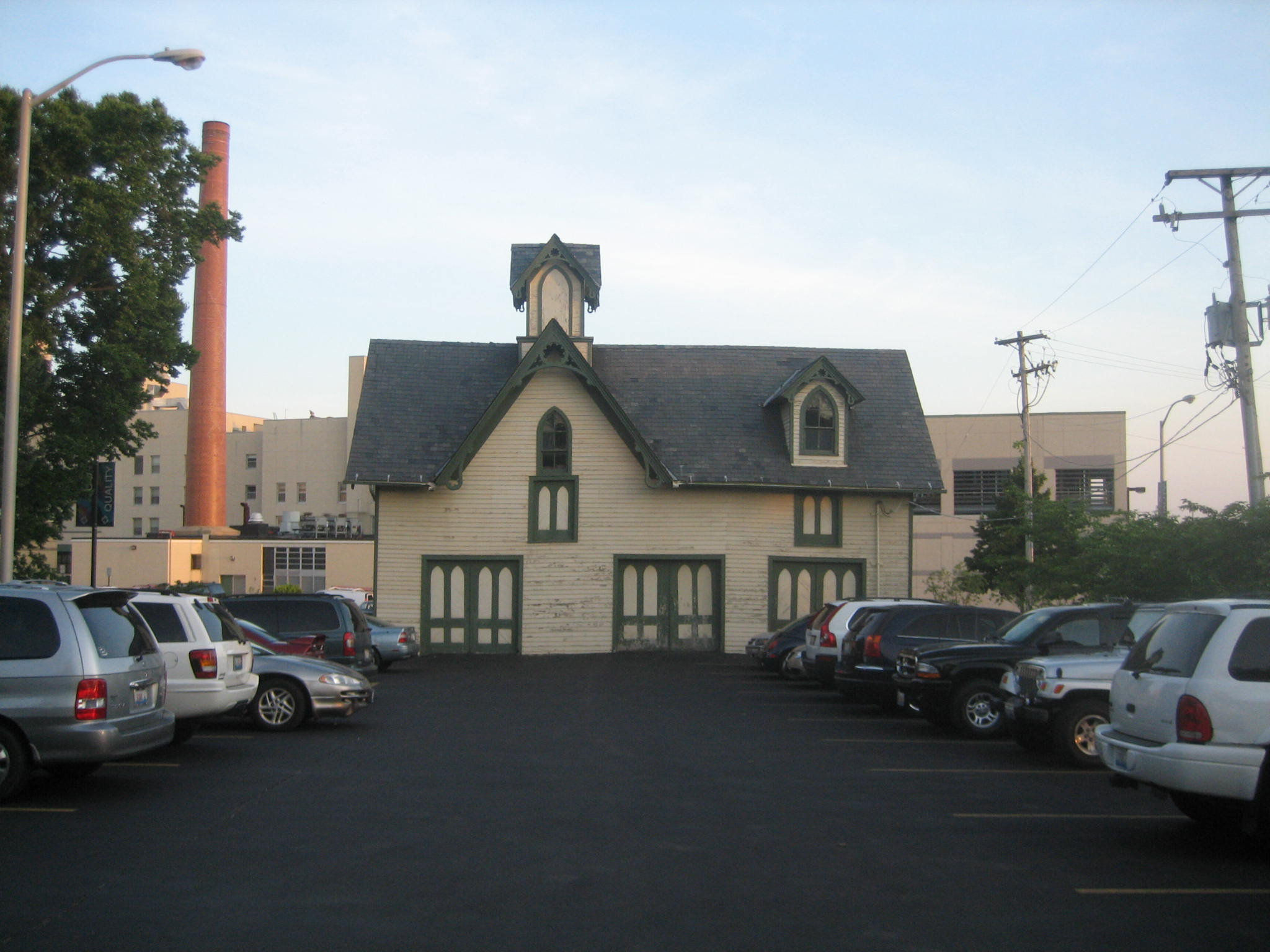
The carriage house, like the main house, is cast in the Gothic Revival style.

The Lake–Peterson House property has an extant outbuilding, the carriage house, which is also cast in the Gothic Revival style. The Lake-Peterson Carriage House was built around the same time as the main house. The building features clapboard siding, arched windows and decorative vergeboards. The carriage house's most striking feature is its multi-gabled louvered cupola. Surviving, contemporary outbuildings are unusual. The carriage house, aside from the Lake–Peterson House itself, was identified as architecturally significant by the Illinois Historic Sites Survey in 1974.

== Significance ==
The Lake–Peterson House is architecturally significant on a statewide scale, being one of Illinois finest examples of Gothic Revival architecture. Indeed, the 1974 Illinois Historic Sites Survey cited the house as architecturally significant, as well as significant in the area of industry because of its prominent owners. The Lake–Peterson House displays nearly all elements described by architectural historian John Blumenson as embodying the Victorian Gothic style as opposed to later or earlier manifestations of the style. The Lake–Peterson House is listed as a local landmark by the city of Rockford. On June 25, 1980, the house was listed on the U.S. National Register of Historic Places, included as a contributing property to the listing was the carriage house.
