= Thatchers Cider =

English cider brewery

Coordinates: 51°20′01″N 2°50′10″W

Thatcher Cider

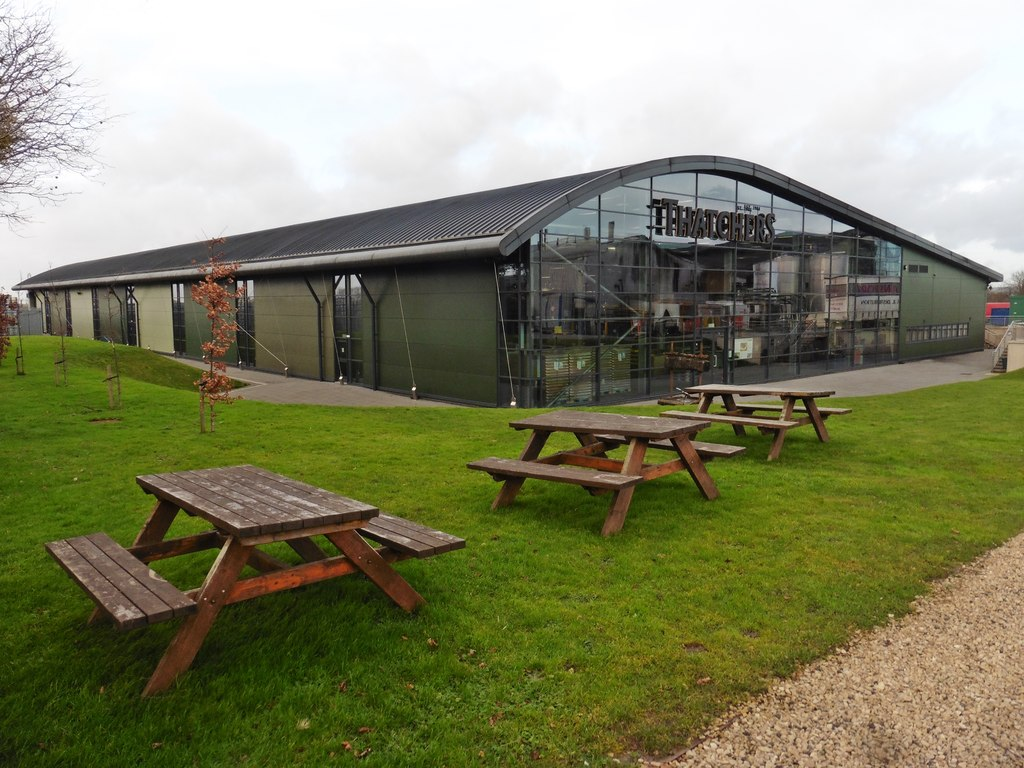
- Factory in Sandford, 2018
- Interactive map of Thatcher Cider
- Location: Sandford, Somerset, England
- Opened: 1904; 122 years ago
- Owner: Independent
- Website: thatcherscider.co.uk

Thatchers Cider is a family-owned cider maker in the village of Sandford in North Somerset, England.

== History ==
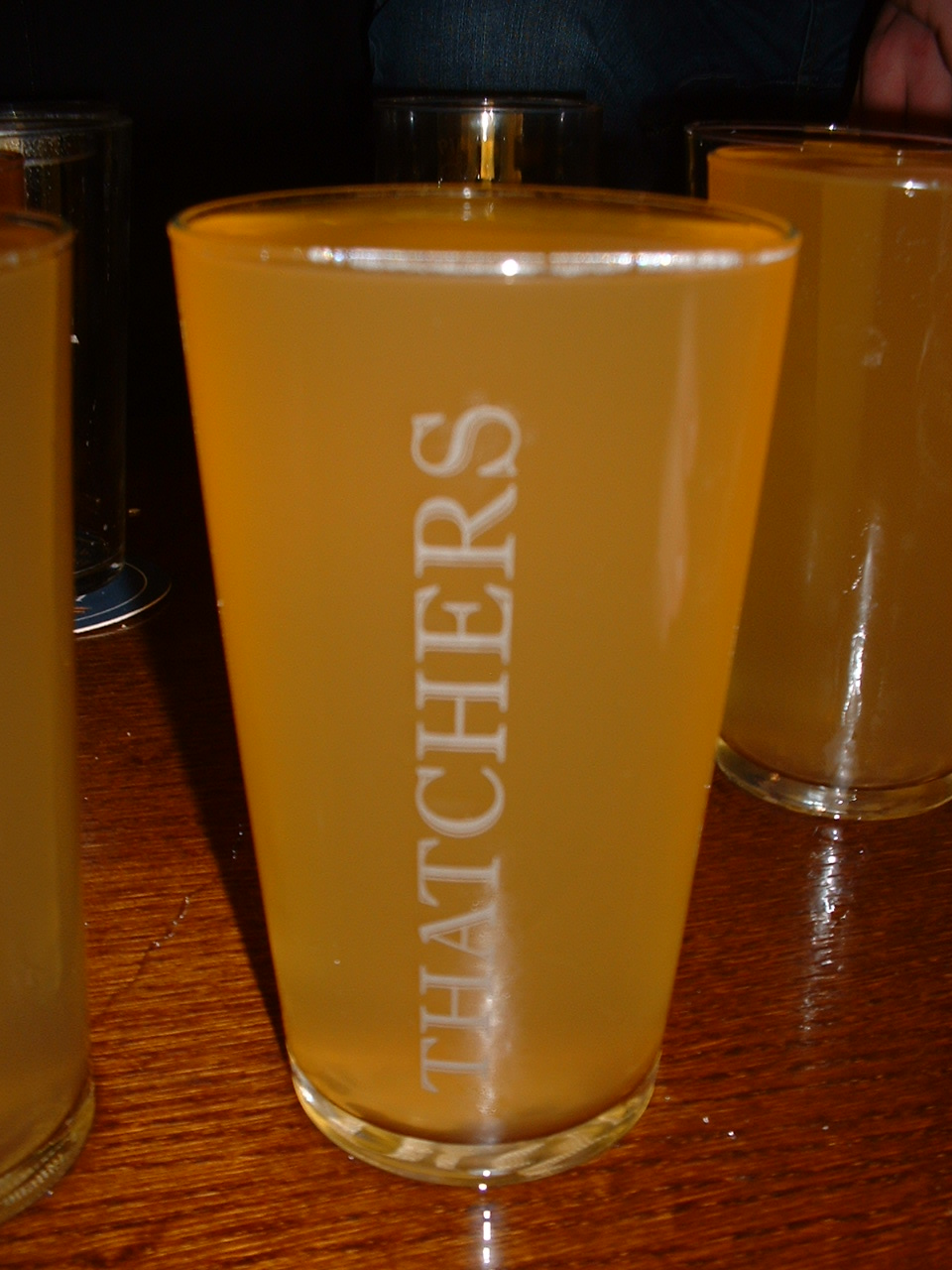
Thatchers traditional dry draught cider in a pint glass, as served in a pub

The Thatchers company was founded by William Thatcher in 1904. His son Stanley Thatcher, born in 1910, began selling draught cider to pubs in Somerset and the company's presence in the area grew. The company is still family owned and employs around 200 people. In 1992 Martin took over from his father, John Thatcher, as managing director.

It has 500 acres of its own orchard, as well as using apples from other growers in the area. Alongside its bush orchards, Thatchers has pioneered a method of growing its apple trees in a hedgerow style. Trained on wires, this enables easier harvesting and also helps to ensure the fruit has the optimum combination of sunlight and rain. It has also led to the development of a new bespoke harvester. At the height of season, Thatchers can press 500 tonnes of apples per day. Thatchers also maintains an exhibition orchard in which over 458 different varieties of apple tree are grown. Many of the traditional ciders produced at Myrtle Farm are matured in 100-year-old oak vats, which gives the cider a distinctive taste although much of their range has a higher than average alcohol content.

In addition to its cider production, Myrtle Farm is the UK's biggest processor of blackcurrants, dealing with 90 per cent of the UK's total crop, which it processes on behalf of Ribena.

== Sponsorships ==
Thatchers Cider is available in many sports clubs and events across the South West. They are involved with teams including Winscombe R.F.C., Bath Rugby, Somerset County Cricket Club, Bristol Bears, Bristol City, Yeovil Town, Gloucestershire County Cricket Club, Bristol Rovers, Southampton, Plymouth Argyle, Exeter City and Torquay United.

Thatchers are also involved in many local events and festivals including: the Glastonbury Festival, the Royal Bath and West Show, the Bristol International Balloon Fiesta and the Cambridge Folk Festival.

Thatcher's lost their ongoing cider sponsorship of the Glastonbury festival in 2019 to Mallets cider.

== TV advertisements ==
Thatchers aired on national TV with Time Stops in 2015, with the concept of showcasing the 12:30pm tasting that happens every Friday at Myrtle Farm, claiming the cider isn't released until Martin Thatcher has tasted each batch after arriving in a balloon.

== See also ==
- Cider in the United Kingdom
