= William Cookson (cricketer) =

Indian-born English cricketer (1862-1922)

Personal information
- Full name: William Whicher Cookson
- Born: 29 August 1862; Mussoorie, India
- Died: 23 December 1922 (aged 60); Winscombe, Somerset, England

Domestic team information
- Years: Team
- 1882: Somerset

Career statistics
Competition	FC
Matches	1
Runs scored	8
Batting average	8.00
100s/50s	0/0
Top score	8
Catches/stumpings	0/–
- Source: CricketArchive, 22 December 2015

William Whicher Cookson (29 August 1862 – 23 December 1922) was an Indian-born English cricketer who played for Somerset. He was born in Mussoorie and died in Winscombe. He was educated at Clifton College and RMA Woolwich. Cookson made a single first-class appearance for the side, during the 1882 season, against Marylebone Cricket Club. Batting as a tailender, he scored eight runs in the only innings in which he batted during the match.
