= Wildings =

Welsh department store group

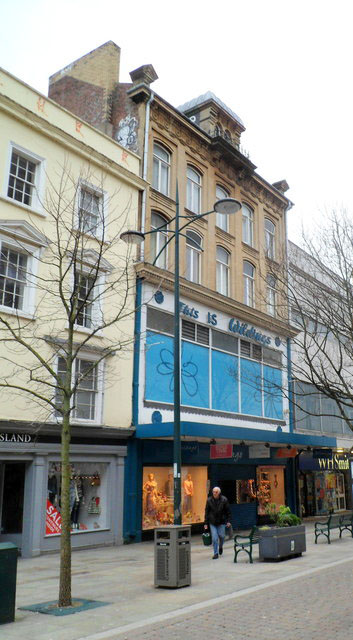
Wildings, Commercial Street, Newport

Wildings was a retail company with its main department store based in Newport, Wales, which closed in 2019 after 144 years of trading.

== Background ==
The first Wildings shop was opened in 1874 by Alfred Wilding, a 21-year-old hatter from Newport, Shropshire. By the mid 1970s there were 14 branches of Wildings across South Wales. By the 1990s only the Newport store remained, though in 1997 Wildings acquired an existing department store business in Commerce House, Thornbury, Gloucestershire. Wildings substantially reduced the size of its Thornbury shop in 2017.

The flagship Newport store had been trading from its site on Commercial Street, Newport since 1931. It underwent a major £140,000 refurbishment in 2014. Wildings Group also ran the Rossiters shops in Bath and Cardiff. Wildings Ltd is now a small property company with interests in Bath, Newport and Thornbury.

== Closure ==
In October 2016 the Newport store closed two floors of its shop, discontinuing its menswear clothing and women's lingerie sections. 14 staff lost their jobs. In August 2018 the store announced it would close completely, laying off the 23 staff. A closing-down sale began in October 2018. The Newport store was finally closed on 19 January 2019.

In October 2023, a police raid at the premises identified a large-scale cannabis factory which had been established across three floors of the building. As at April 2026 the property remains vacant.
