= Church of St James, Winscombe =

Church of St James
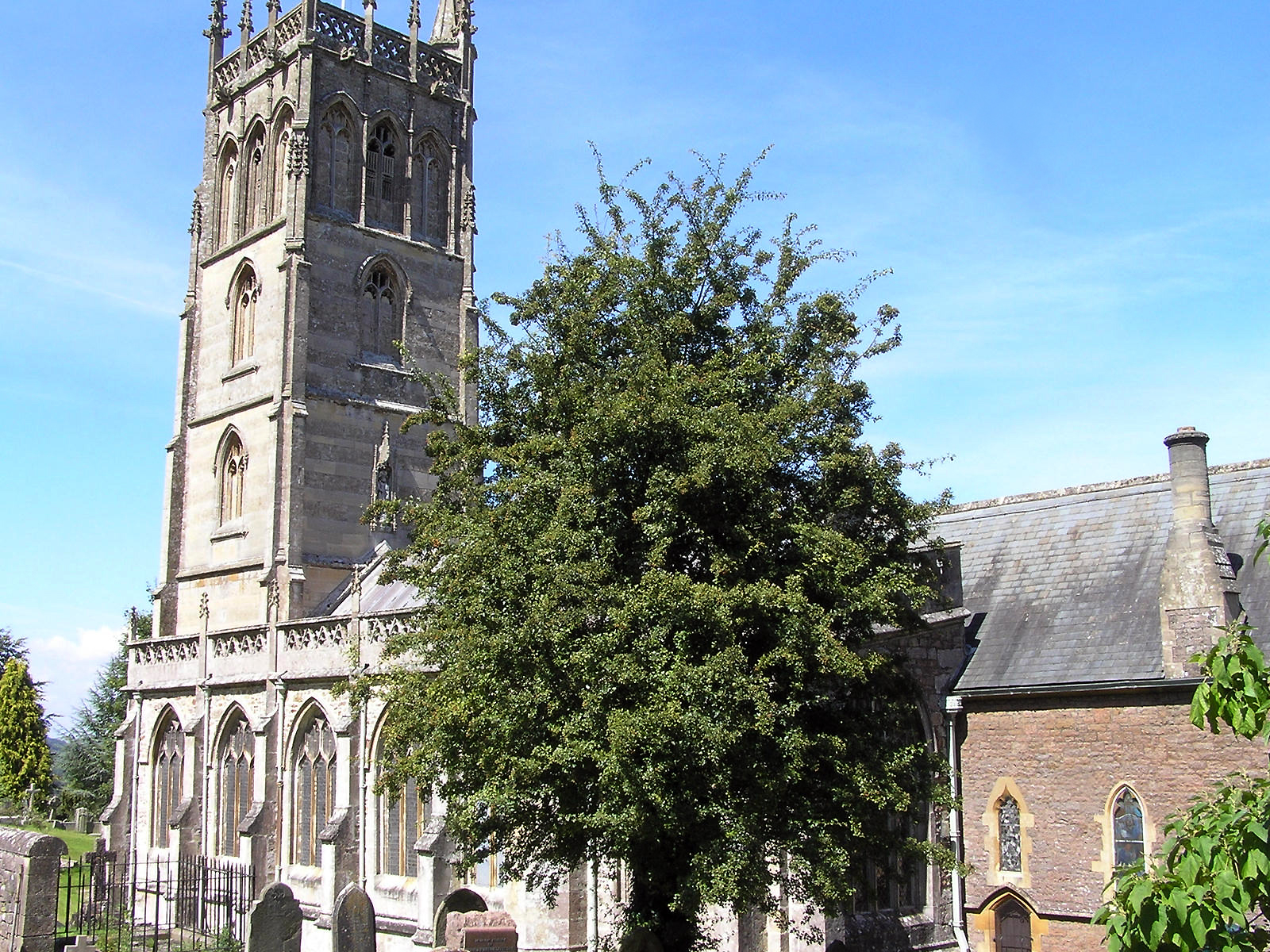

- Location within Somerset
- 51.305913°N 2.845658°W
- Location: Winscombe, Somerset
- Country: England
- Denomination: Church of England
- Churchmanship: Central
- Website: www.achurchnearyou.com/church/11151/

History
- Status: Active
- Dedication: St James the Great
- Consecrated: 26 August 1236

Architecture
- Functional status: Parish church
- Heritage designation: Grade I
- Designated: 9 February 1961
- Completed: 15th century

Administration
- Diocese: Diocese of Bath and Wells
- Archdeaconry: Archdeaconry of Bath
- Parish: Winscombe and Sandford

The Church of St James in Winscombe, Somerset, England, has 12th- or 13th-century origins but the present building dates from the 15th century. It is a Grade I listed building.

There are no records remaining of the Norman church on the site, though the font and a single lancet window date from the period, and a Deed of Gift survives confirming that the church was consecrated by Bishop Jocelin on 26 August 1236. It was given by him to the Dean and Chapter of Wells Cathedral three years later. The four-stage 100-foot (30.5 m) tower ("one of the most elegant" in Somerset) was added around 1435, by Bishop John Harewell, and at the same time stained glass was added.

The church was restored and a new chancel added in 1863. The rebuilding of the chancel was undertaken by William Burges. He was commissioned by the Reverend John Augustus Yatman, whose brother had been Burges's main client for painted furniture. Burges and his team, including Fred Weekes and Gualbert Saunders, also undertook the design of three stained-glass lancet windows in the chancel, in memory of Yatman's mother. Pevsner appreciated their quality, "much better aesthetically is the glass in the chancel," but erroneously attributed them as "one of the best examples of Morris glass in existence and quite unrecorded." The Carsleigh Window in the north wall of the chancel (c. 1520) is decorated with silver stain, "marking the close of the Middle Ages and the arrival of the Renaissance". There is medieval glass in the two windows in the north wall of the side chapel, and in the window next to the organ.

The bells of St James have long called people to worship, the original bells being cast in 1773 by local founders the Bilbie family. Two newer bells were added in 1903 by Taylors Founders. The eight bells are in the key of E flat and the tenor weighs 18–1–8 (18 hundredweight, 1 quarter of a hundredweight and 8 lb, or 930 kg). St James holds regular services on Sundays, with bell ringing being provided for both the morning service and evensong.

== See also ==
- List of Grade I listed buildings in North Somerset
- List of towers in Somerset
- List of ecclesiastical parishes in the Diocese of Bath and Wells
