= George Wilding =

George Wilding, MD
- Occupation(s): Director, UW Carbone Cancer Center; Anderson Professor of Clinical Oncology, UW-Madison

George Wilding was the director of the UW Carbone Cancer Center and Anderson Professor of Clinical Oncology of the Department of Medicine of the UW School of Medicine and Public Health and an internationally recognized leader and clinician in the fields of oxidative stress and prostate cancer prevention and therapy. He is a member of the editorial board of the journal “The Prostate”.

== Biography ==
Wilding is the principal inventor of Colby Pharmaceutical Company's prostate cancer therapeutic drug and a major collaborator with Hirak Basu in the invention of CPC-200. As the UW Carbone Cancer Center Director of Clinical Research, he oversees peer-reviewed cancer research funding at UWCCC. About 250 clinical trials are available for patient enrollment at the center, with more than 700 patients participating each year.

Wilding graduated from the University of Massachusetts Medical School, where he also completed his training in internal medicine. He underwent training in medical oncology at the National Cancer Institute. He joined the UW School of Medicine and Public Health faculty to focus on the development of new cancer therapies, particularly aimed at progressive and advanced prostate cancer. He is currently the principal investigator on grants funded by the National Cancer Institute, the Department of Defense, and the Prostate Cancer Foundation. His research teams are conducting laboratory and in clinical studies aimed at developing and testing new cancer treatments, particularly therapies targeting angiogenesis, cell signaling and differentiation.

== See also ==
- Reactive oxygen species
- Oxidative stress
