= Rewilding (disambiguation) =

Rewilding is a form of ecological restoration that returns habitats to their natural states.

Rewilding may also refer to:

- Rewilding Europe, a programme to bring about rewilding in Europe
- Pleistocene rewilding, a form of species reintroduction
- Rewilding Institute, an organization concerned with the integration of traditional wildlife and wildlands conservation
- Rewilding (anarchism), the reversal of human "domestication"
- Rewilding (horse), a thoroughbred racehorse

== See also ==
- Species reintroduction, the deliberate release of a species into the wild
