= Swedish American Hospital =

SwedishAmerican Hospital
- UW Health
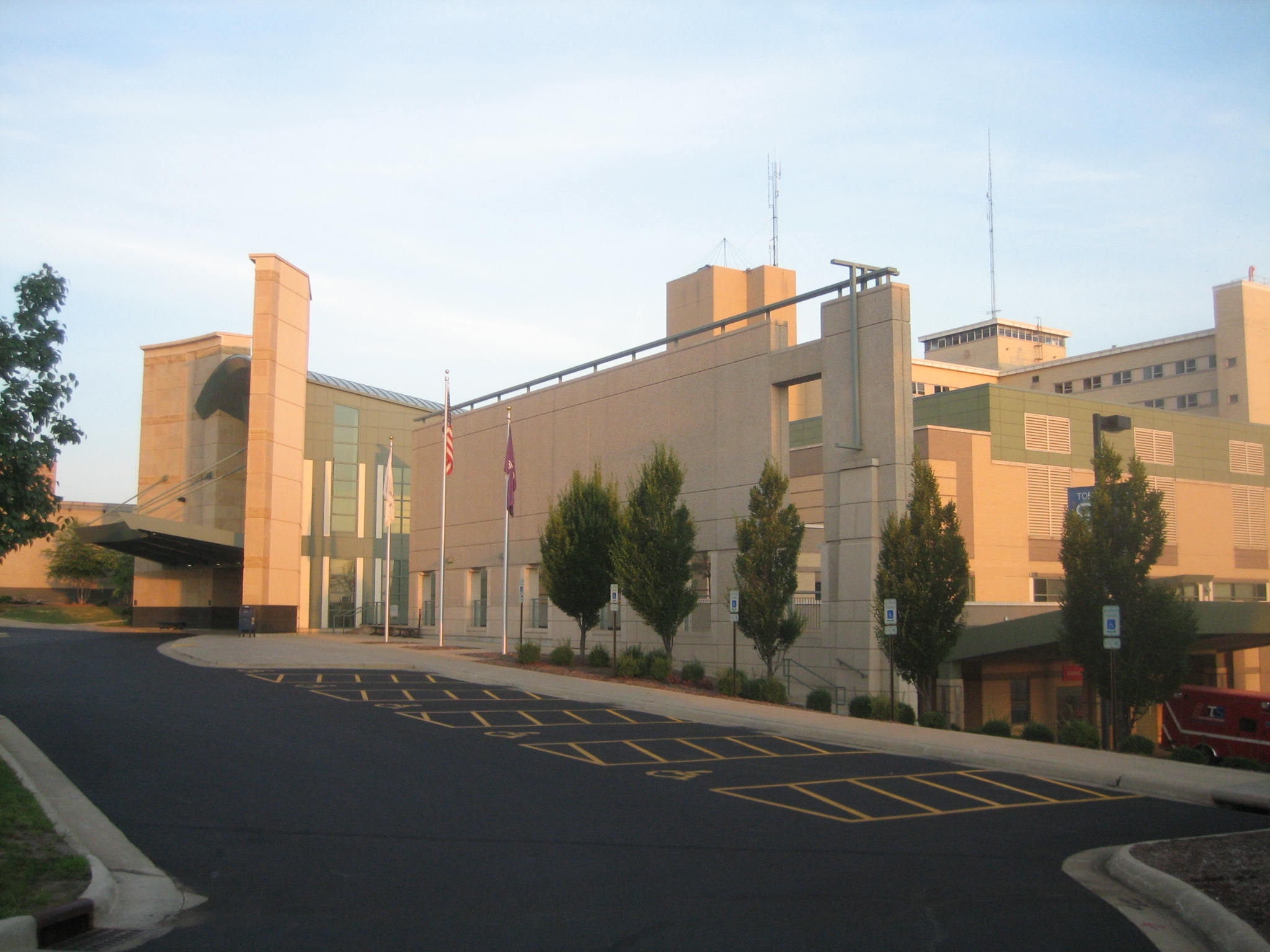

Geography
- Location: Rockford, northern Illinois, Southern Wisconsin, Illinois, United States
- Coordinates: 42°15′55.4″N 89°4′27.7″W

Organization
- Type: Teaching
- Affiliated university: University of Illinois-Rockford

Services
- Emergency department: Level II trauma center
- Beds: 333

History
- Founded: 1918

Links
- Website: www.uwhealth.org/about-us/uw-health-northern-illinois
- Lists: Hospitals in Illinois

SwedishAmerican Hospital is a 357-bed non profit, teaching hospital located in Rockford, Illinois. The hospital is a division of UW Health. The hospital was founded in 1911, opening its doors in 1918 following a period of fund raising. In the mid-1990s the hospital proposed a major campus overhaul that was eventually approved by the city of Rockford, providing SwedishAmerican assistance in recovering a blighted neighborhood nearby. The hospital employees more than 350 physicians and includes an emergency department that is a level II trauma center.

== History ==
In 1911, in response to a great need for healthcare services in Rockford, the city's growing Swedish community, under the leadership of Pehr August Peterson, decided to build a new hospital. Swedish American Hospital, founded in 1911, opened its doors to its first patient on July 18, 1918 with the completion of a 55-bed, US$175,000 facility. The hospital's completion followed a period of fund raising to pay for it.

During the mid-1990s officials at Swedish American proposed a long term hospital campus modernization and expansion. Part of the proposal was a request to the city of Rockford was to reroute Charles Street, which passed through the middle of the existing hospital campus. The city agreed, provided Swedish American help renovate and revitalize the blighted neighborhood south of the hospital. The hospital acquired 31 properties in a six-block area south of the complex and committed $2 million to the project. By 2001 dilapidated structures had been demolished and the hospital, along with the city and Habitat for Humanity began construction on the area's first new homes.

Concurrently Swedish American Hospital began its own revitalization project of its campus and in June 2006 a $44 million heart hospital opened on the campus of Swedish American. The 94 bed heart hospital gave Swedish American Hospital a new look along with allowing them to better treat cardiovascular diseases. In total, between 2000 and 2006, Swedish American Health System spent $100 million on campus and neighborhood improvements.

== Services ==
SwedishAmerican Hospital is a 357-bed non-profit hospital which serves the greater Rockford, Illinois region; that area includes northern Illinois and southern Wisconsin. Swedish American is also a teaching hospital which has an affiliation with the University of Illinois College of Medicine. The hospital employees more than 350 physicians across 40 different specialties and features an outpatient surgery center which approximately 6,000 people utilize annually. The emergency department at SwedishAmerican is a Level II Trauma Facility. The hospital is owned and operated by UW Health, and was formerly owned and operated by Swedish American Health System.

== Facilities ==
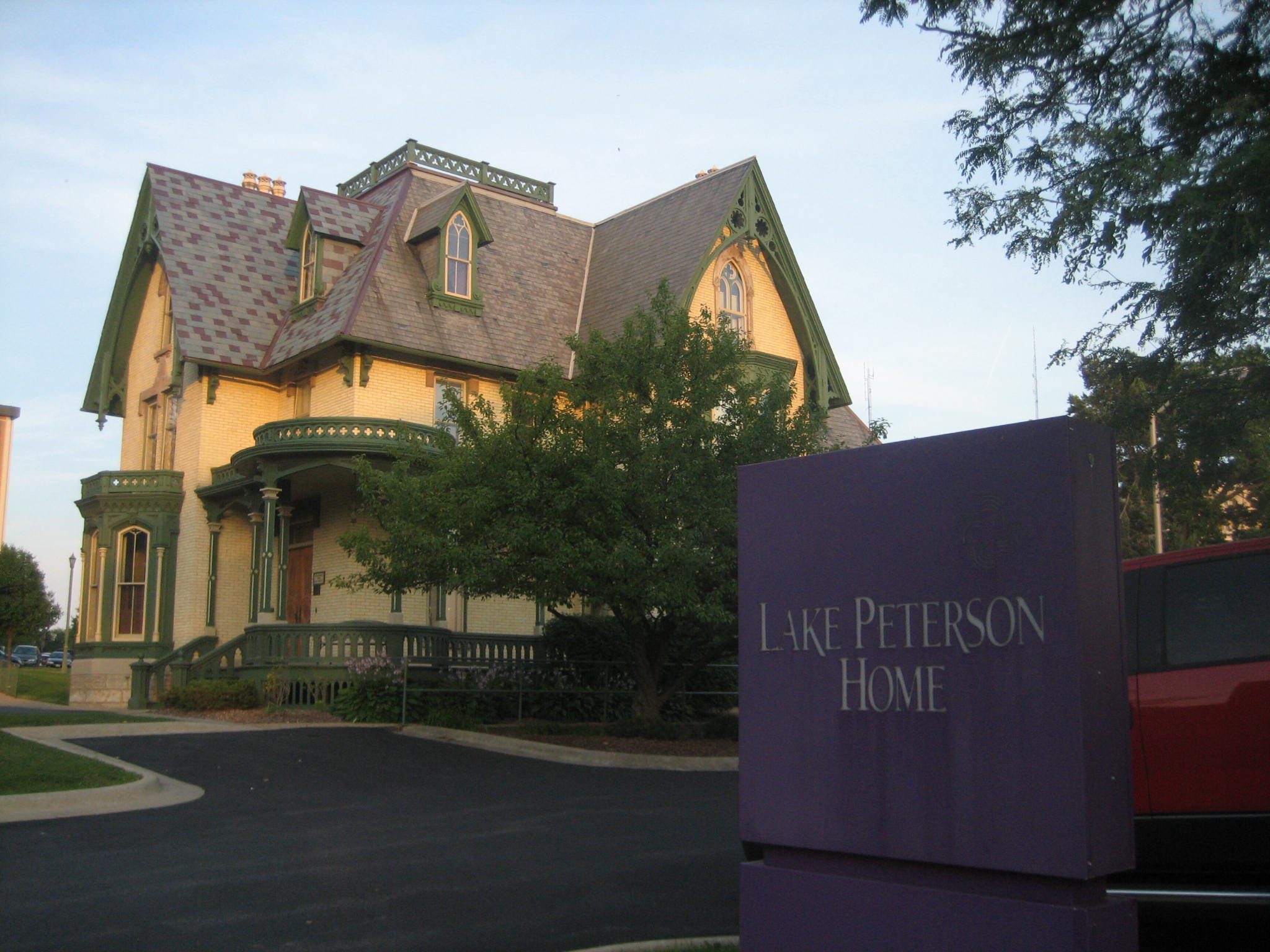
The Lake-Peterson House stands on the ground of the main complex of the hospital.

Following the expansion of the campus Swedish American Hospital now includes several separate and interconnecting structures. The main campus is bounded by East State Street (US 20) on its north and by East Charles Street on its south-southwest side. Intersecting Charles and State Streets at the hospital's west boundary is Ninth Street, to the east is Williams Park. The buildings within the main Swedish American complex include the 94 bed heart hospital, SwedishAmerican Regional Cancer Center, a state of the art radiology and oncology center, opened in July 2013, Camelot Tower, the Renaissance Pavilion, the two main wings, and two other buildings which are located on the periphery of the main campus. The Ninth Street Center is located across Ninth Street from Swedish American Hospital and the L.P Johnson Building is located in the complex's far northwest corner. The hospital also owns an 1873 Gothic Revival house, known as the Lake-Peterson House which was donated by the estate of Pehr August Peterson. The house stands on the main Swedish American campus and is listed on the U.S. National Register of Historic Places. The emergency department entrance at Swedish American is located on the buildings west facade and is entered via a driveway that stretches from Charles Street, across the complex, to State Street.

== Performance and awards ==
According to a 2005 survey, 98% of Swedish American patients would recommend Swedish American Health Systems to their friends and family.

Clinical Quality

- Top 100 Hospital Quality Award (Total Benchmark Solutions)
- 100 Top Hospital Designation (Solucient)
- Distinguished Hospital Award (J.D. Power and Associates)
- National Quality Cup (Rochester Institute of Technology)
- Cardiac Surgery Excellence Award (HealthGrades)
- Outstanding Achievement Award (American College of Surgeons Commission on Cancer)
- "Best in Hearts" Designation (HealthGrades)
- Consumer Preference/Patient Satisfaction
- Consumer Choice Award (National Research Corporation)
- Patient Satisfaction Award (Arbor and Associates)

Community Impact

- On the Bus Award (Crusader Clinic)
- Corporate Award (Salvation Army)
- Community Impact Award (MidTown District)

Workplace Excellence

- Top 100 Integrated Healthcare Network (Verispan)
- Lincoln Award for Excellence (Lincoln Award for Performance Excellence)
- Governor's Family Investment Award (State of Illinois)
- Gold Award of Well Workplace USA (Wellness Councils of America)

Information Technology

- Most Wired Hospital (Hospitals & Health Networks Magazine)
