= UW Health =

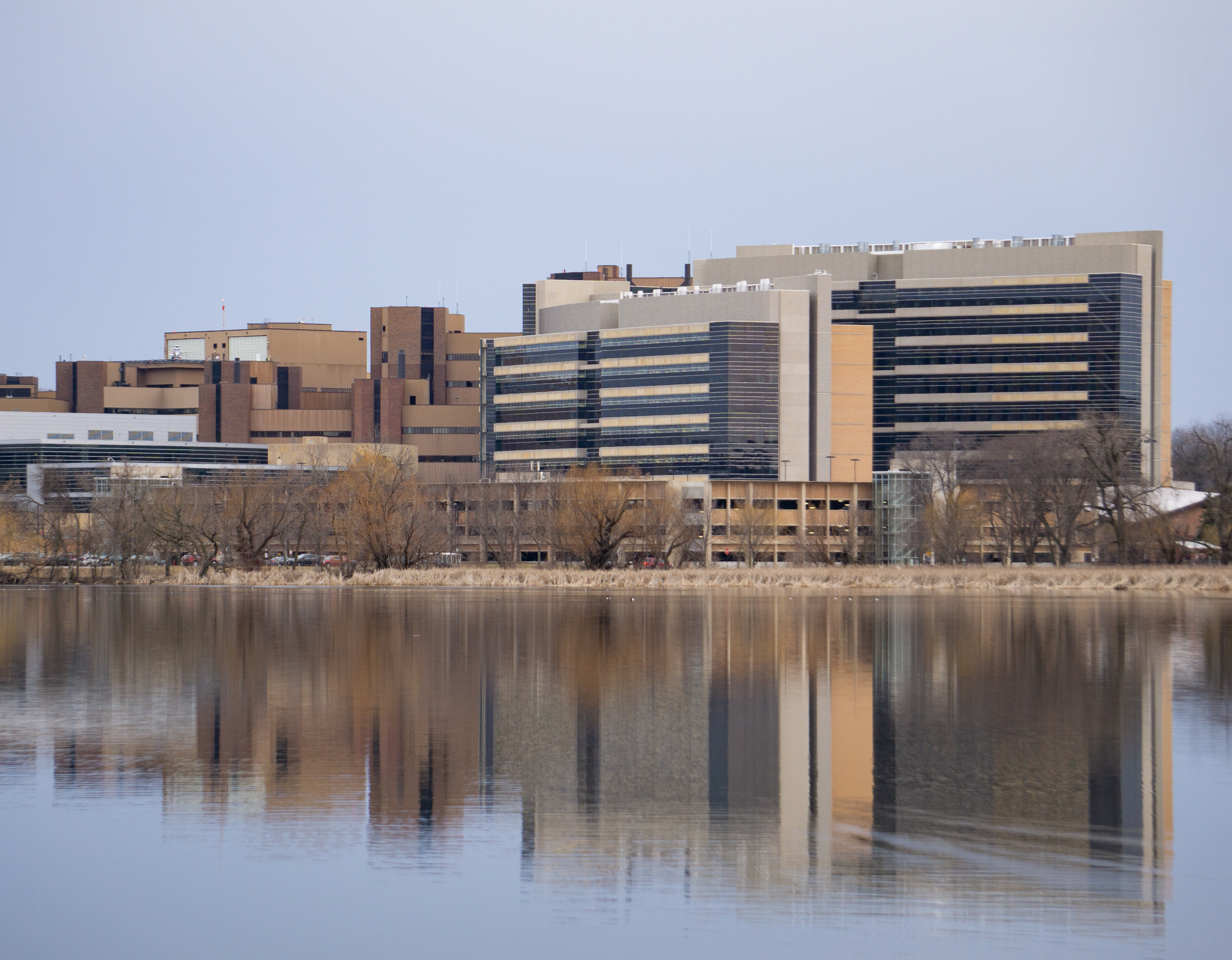
- Company type: Public hospital
- Industry: Health care
- Founded: Madison, Wisconsin (1924)
- Headquarters: Madison, Wisconsin, United States
- Area served: Wisconsin, Illinois
- Key people: Alan Kaplan, MD (CEO)
- Number of employees: 24,000
- Website: www.uwhealth.org

The University of Wisconsin Hospitals and Clinics Authority, branded as UW Health, is a public hospital system based in Madison, Wisconsin. Organized under Wisconsin state law, UW Health has been independent from the University of Wisconsin System since its reorganization in 1996. The system merged with the SwedishAmerican Health System of Rockford, Illinois in 2015. UW Health operates seven medical centers and 105 outpatient clinics in Wisconsin and northern Illinois.

== History ==
The precursor of the UW Health system was Wisconsin General Hospital, established by the University of Wisconsin–Madison in 1924. The current University Hospital building, now UW Health's flagship medical center, opened in 1979.

In 1989, University chancellor Donna Shalala appointed a committee to consider reforms to the university hospital administration. The committee unanimously recommended privatization of the hospital in November 1990, although Shalala did not publicize the committee report. The privatization proposal became controversial among faculty and hospital staff when it was made public the following year. The University of Wisconsin System Board of Regents approved a modified version of the proposal in 1992, where the hospital would be removed from the university's administration but remain state-owned, with the university retaining control over its budget. Governor Tommy Thompson included this reform in his 1995 state budget.

Before the authority's creation, the University Board of Regents operated Health Professionals, Inc., as a non-profit corporation responsible for establishing a health care network between University Hospital and private physicians. However, in June 1994, state Attorney General Jim Doyle issued the opinion that the creation of Health Professionals, Inc., was improper, as it diverted state funds to a private agency which did not follow open records laws. Doyle advocated for an audit of the hospital's finances. The creation of the authority resolved this issue, as the authority's funds were no longer part of the state budget. The clinics operated by Health Professionals, Inc., were rebranded as University Community Clinics and incorporated into the new authority's remit.

Former logo of UW Health from 1997 to 2021.

The University of Wisconsin Hospitals and Clinics Authority was established on July 1, 1996, taking over management of the hospital from the university. Later that year, it issued $50 million in bonds to fund the construction of two new primary care clinic buildings in the Madison area and the purchase of a building where some of its medical offices were already located. It also expanded its network of affiliated clinics throughout the state. To reflect these changes, the authority adopted the shortened "UW Health" name for branding purposes in August 1997.

UW Health merged with SwedishAmerican Health System of Rockford, Illinois, in 2015. All SwedishAmerican facilities adopted the UW Health branding in 2021.

In 2017, UW Health established a joint partnership with one of Madison's other major medical centers, UnityPoint Health - Meriter.

== Board of directors ==
The authority is governed by a board of directors consisting of sixteen members. Six members are nominated by the Governor of Wisconsin and confirmed by the Wisconsin State Senate for terms lasting five years. The president of the University of Wisconsin System Board of Regents may choose three regents to serve on the board. The dean of the UW School of Medicine and Public Health serves on the board ex officio. The two co-chairs of the Wisconsin Legislature Joint Committee on Finance, the chancellor of the University of Wisconsin–Madison, and the State Secretary of Administration all have ex officio seats on the board, although they may choose designees to work on their behalf. The chancellor may also appoint one department chair from the School of Medicine and Public Health faculty and one department chair from another health-related school (such as the School of Nursing or the School of Pharmacy) to the board.

The board of directors is responsible for appointing a chief executive officer for UW Health. Since May 2016, the system's CEO has been Alan Kaplan, MD.

== Purpose ==
The hospital and clinics are directed by statute to: "maintain, control and supervise the use of the University of Wisconsin Hospitals and Clinics, for the purposes of:

1. Delivering comprehensive, high−quality health care to patients using the hospitals and to those seeking care from its programs, including a commitment to provide such care for the medically indigent.
2. Providing an environment suitable for instructing medical and other health professions students, physicians, nurses and members of other health−related disciplines.
3. Sponsoring and supporting research in the delivery of health care to further the welfare of the patients treated and applying the advances in health knowledge to alleviate human suffering, promote health and prevent disease.
4. Assisting health programs and personnel throughout the state and region in the delivery of health care."

== Facilities ==
=== University Hospital ===
UW Health's flagship Level I trauma center, University Hospital, is located in downtown Madison and is a teaching hospital with 614 beds and a Level I Trauma and Emergency Center. University Hospital was ranked by the U.S. News & World Report as the 16th best hospital in the United States and the #1 hospital in Wisconsin in the publication's 2021-2022 Best Hospitals Honor Roll, earning national rankings in 10 adult and 6 pediatric specialties. Additionally, UW Health University Hospital was ranked as the 22nd best hospital in the United States and #84th Best Hospitals in the world by Newsweek in 2022.

==== University of Wisconsin Carbone Cancer Center ====
Located at University Hospital, the UW Carbone Cancer Center is Wisconsin's only Comprehensive Cancer Center, as designated by the National Cancer Institute. UW Health also operates five regional cancer centers in Beloit, Johnson Creek, Pewaukee, and Wisconsin Rapids, as joint partnerships between Carbone and the local medical centers there, and at the SwedishAmerican Hospital in Rockford, Illinois.

=== American Family Children's Hospital ===
American Family Children's Hospital (AFCH) is a pediatric acute care hospital located adjacent to UW Health University Hospital in Madison, Wisconsin. The hospital has 101 beds and is affiliated with The University of Wisconsin School of Medicine and Public Health. The hospital is a member of the University of Wisconsin Hospital and Clinics. The hospital provides comprehensive pediatric specialties and subspecialties to infants, children, teens, and young adults aged 0–21 throughout Wisconsin and surrounding states. American Family Children's Hospital features the only pediatric Level 1 Trauma Center in the region, and 1 of 2 in the state.

UW Health opened the American Family Children's Hospital on August 29, 2007. The $78 million facility was funded by $41 million in private donations, which included $10 million contributed by American Family Insurance, and $37 million in bonds.

=== UW Health East Madison Hospital (EMH) ===
UW Health also operates UW Health East Madison Hospital, located in the American Center business park on the northeast side of Madison. The hospital, which opened in 2015, includes 83 beds and an emergency room with a rating of Level 4 Trauma Center. The campus also includes the UW Health Rehabilitation Hospital, and 0.5 miles away and the UW Health East Clinic. On April 12, 2022, UW Health announced that The American Center Hospital would be renamed to "UW Health East Madison Hospital".

=== UW Health SwedishAmerican Hospital (SwedishAmerican Hospital) ===
SwedishAmerican Hospital is located in downtown Rockford, Illinois. It opened in 1911 and was acquired by UW Health in 2015.

=== UW Health Eastpark Medical Center ===
Eastpark Medical Center is located in the far northeastern portion of Madison, near Sun Prairie, Wisconsin. It opened to patients on October 28, 2024. The seven-story building offers specialty care, including Wisconsin's first Integrated Specialty Care for Women Program.

=== UW Health Belvidere Hospital ===
Belvidere Hospital in Belvidere, Illinois, was formerly SwedishAmerican Medical Center-Belvidere, before it was merged along with the rest of the SwedishAmerican system in 2015.

== Personnel ==
As of 2023, UW Health employed approximately 24,000+ employees throughout all of its hospitals, clinics and supportive centers. 1,850+ Physicians (MD's and DO's), 1,000+ Advanced Practice Provider, 5,650+ Registered Nurses, 1,340+ Nursing Assistants/Techs, and 730+ Resident and Fellows.

== Recognition ==
- In 2022, UW Hospital and Clinics (UWHC) was named the top hospital in Wisconsin by U.S. News & World Report for the eleventh consecutive year.
- UW Hospital and Clinics received "magnet hospital" designation by the American Nurses Credentialing Center in 2009.
- UW Hospital and Clinics was named the #1 academic medical center nationwide for outstanding nursing quality in 2009 by American Nurses Association, based on performance on the National Database of Nursing Quality Indicators (NDNQI).
- UW Hospital and Clinics ranked among the top five academic health centers nationwide in a University HealthSystem Consortium benchmarking study of safety, mortality, clinical effectiveness and equity in delivering care, 2008.
- UW Hospital and Clinics ranked among the top 50 in the nation in 15 medical specialties in the most recent (2016) U.S. News & World Report hospital ranking. Additionally, the American Family Children's Hospital was ranked among the top 50 in the nation in five medical specialties in the same report.”
- UW Hospital and Clinics named among "100 Best Companies" in the nation by Working Mother magazine in 2007 and 2008.
- The Hospital and Clinics' Heart and Vascular Care program listed among top 100 hospital programs in the Thomson Reuters Cardiovascular Benchmarks for Success, 2004–2008.
- In 2023,
  - U.S. News & Word Report’s Best Hospitals: #1 hospital in Wisconsin for the 11th year, 5 specialties ranked among the best in the nation and 5 specialties ranked as high performing
  - Practice Greenhealth: 2 national awards for Achievements in Sustainability
  - Human Rights Campaign Foundation: Leader in LGBTQ+ Healthcare Equality
  - Watson Health: One of the Nation’s 50 Top Cardiovascular Hospitals
  - Becker’s Hospital Review: 100 Great Hospitals in America
  - Magnet®-designated facilities: University Hospital, East Madison Hospital, American Family Children’s Hospital, SwedishAmerican Hospital
