= Winscombe =

Village in Somerset, England

Coordinates: 51.3136°N 2.8263°W

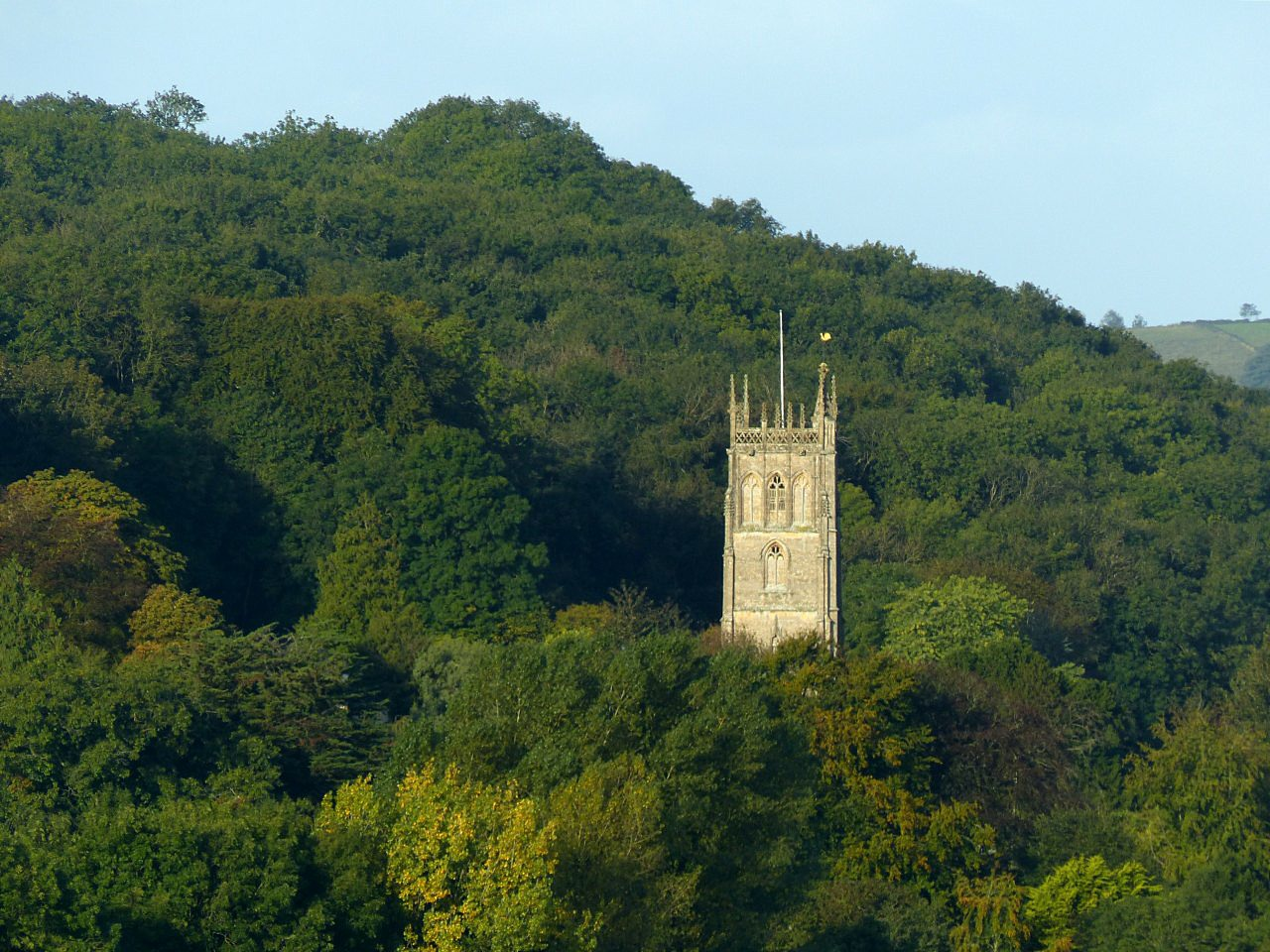
- Winscombe Church tower

- Location within Somerset
- Population: est. 4,500
- OS grid reference: ST425575
- Civil parish: Winscombe and Sandford
- Unitary authority: North Somerset
- Ceremonial county: Somerset
- Region: South West
- Country: England
- Sovereign state: United Kingdom
- Post town: WINSCOMBE
- Postcode district: BS25
- Dialling code: 01934
- Police: Avon and Somerset
- Fire: Avon
- Ambulance: South Western
- UK Parliament: Wells and Mendip Hills

Winscombe is a large village in the North Somerset unitary district of Somerset, England, close to the settlements of Axbridge and Cheddar, on the western edge of the Mendip Hills, 7 miles (11 km) southeast of Weston-super-Mare and 14 miles (23 km) southwest of Bristol. The Parish of Winscombe and Sandford, centred on the Parish Church of Church of St James the Great, includes the villages/hamlets of Barton, Hale, Oakridge, Nye, Sidcot and Woodborough.

Winscombe has a few shops and businesses focused in the centre of the village, along Woodborough Road and Sandford Road. There is a doctor's surgery in the village, a vet and two dentists.

West of the village is the Max Bog biological Site of Special Scientific Interest.

== History ==
It has been suggested that the name means a valley belonging to a Saxon named Wine.

The parish was part of the Winterstoke Hundred.

Winscombe was the subject of a historical and archaeological study led by Professor Mick Aston, published in the Proceedings of the Somerset Archaeological and Natural History Society.

In April 1973, many residents died in Invicta International Airlines Flight 435, the worst aviation accident in Swiss history, with those from Axbridge and Cheddar.

== Governance ==
From 1894 to 1974 Winscombe was part of the Axbridge Rural District. When this was abolished under the Local Government Act 1972 it became part of the Woodspring district in the new county of Avon. In 1996 this became the North Somerset unitary authority, which remains part of the ceremonial county of Somerset.

The village is part of the Wells and Mendip Hills parliamentary constituency.

== Geography ==
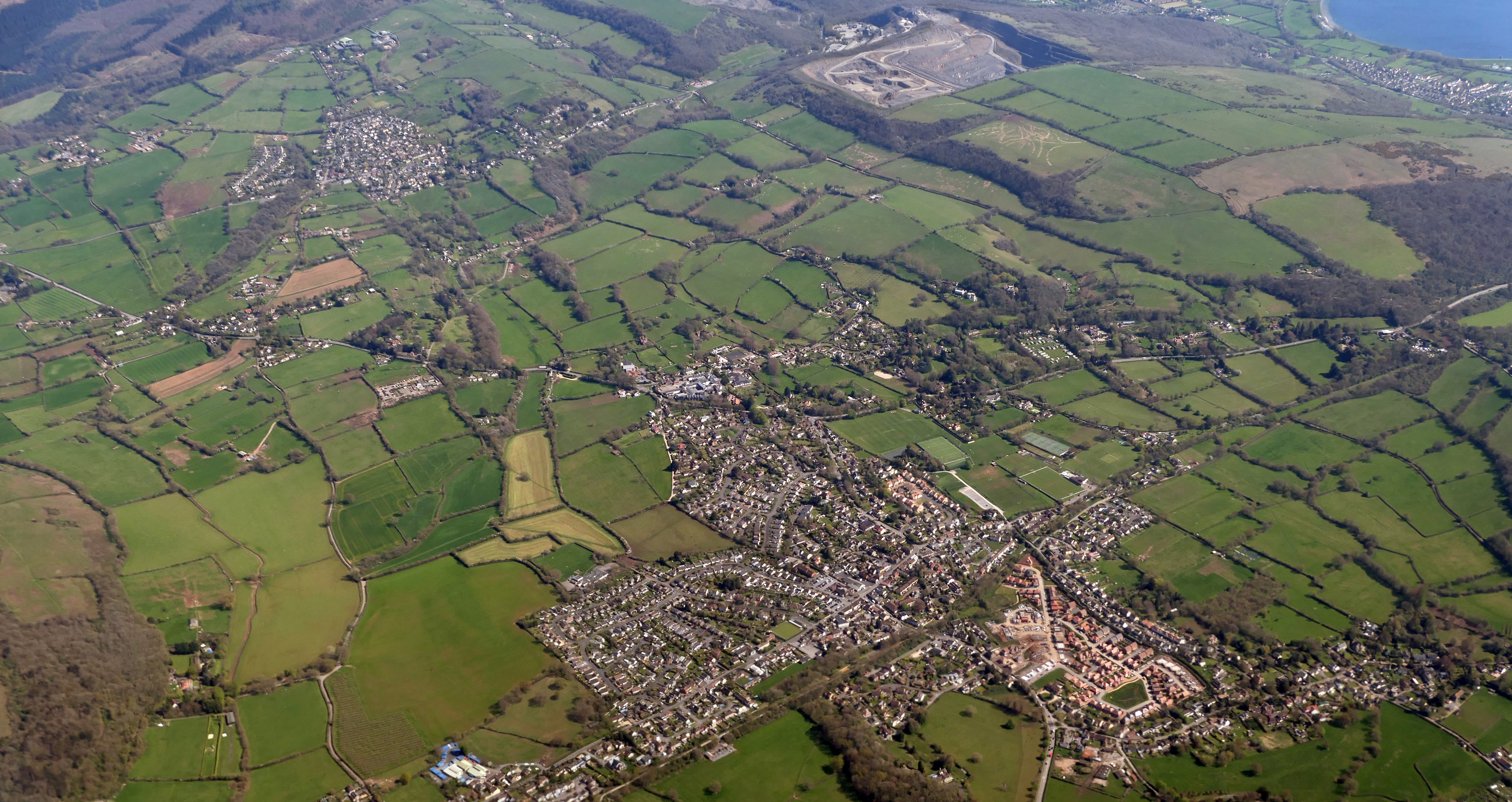
View of Winscombe, with Shipham and Cheddar reservoir in the distance

Slader's Leigh is a local nature reserve. It is a wildflower meadow with plants including devil's-bit scabious, cowslip, betony, common spotted orchid and tormentil which provide a habitat for a range of butterflies.

== Transport ==
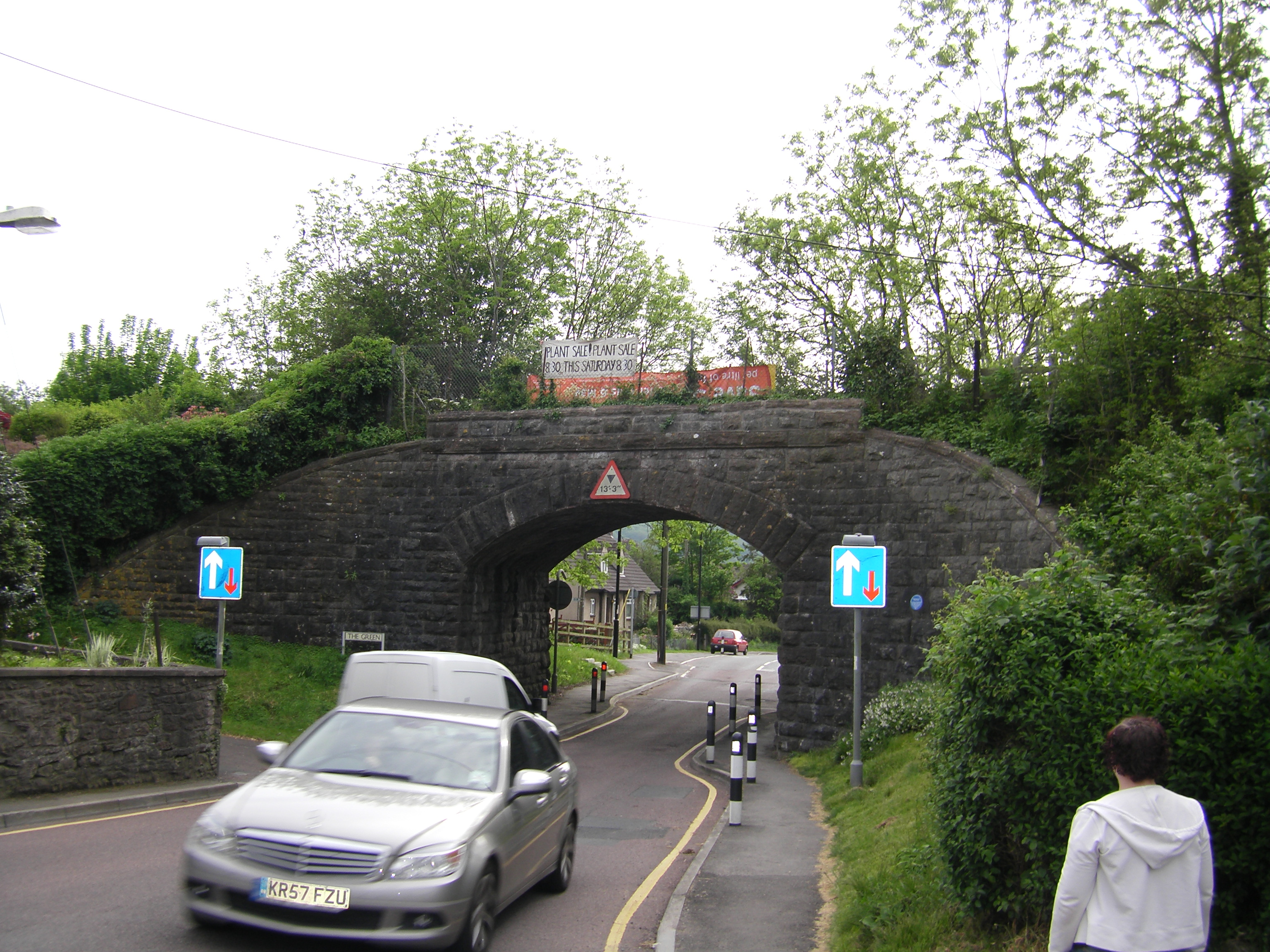
The bridge going over Woodborough Road in Winscombe on the A371, which used to be the old railway bridge and is now used for the Strawberry Line railway walk and cycle path

Winscombe grew in the 19th century with the arrival of a branch of the Great Western Railway, opened in 1869. This was the Cheddar Valley line, also known as the Strawberry Line, which ran from Yatton to Wells via Cheddar. The railway was closed in 1963, and today the route is a public footpath and cycle track; the site of the former Winscombe railway station is now the Millennium Green. It is possible to walk, or cycle, from the railway station to the coast at Clevedon via Sandford, Congresbury and Yatton, and in the opposite direction through the railway tunnel at Shute Shelve Hill to Axbridge and Cheddar.

The railway station was originally named Woodborough, that being the part of the parish of Winscombe where it was; Winscombe was originally the settlement up by the church. The railway station was soon renamed Winscombe to avoid confusion with another railway station in Wiltshire named Woodborough. The railway station was closed in 1963 as part of the Beeching cuts to rail services. Part of the original track can still be seen from a platform by the Millennium Green.

The village is on the A371 and A38 roads.

== Education ==
There are three schools in the village, as well as community and sports facilities. State secondary education is provided at nearby Churchill Community School. Sidcot is a nearby fee-paying independent school run by the Society of Friends. Winscombe Primary School is a primary school in the village that provides education from Reception to Year 6 and is run by the Wessex Learning Trust.

== Sports ==
There is a well-established recreational ground a short distance from the centre of Winscombe, which accommodates a variety of different sports, including cricket, tennis, hockey, bowls, football (Winscombe AFC), and a rugby union team (Winscombe RFC).

The rugby club hosts three annual tournaments for mini and junior players: a mini rugby tournament for local schools; a regional championship for under 8s; and the Mendip Sevens rugby sevens tournament for ages under 13s–under 16s.

== Religious sites ==
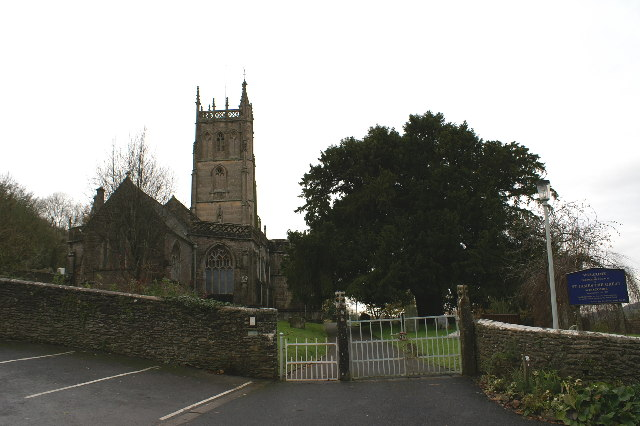
Church of St James, Winscombe

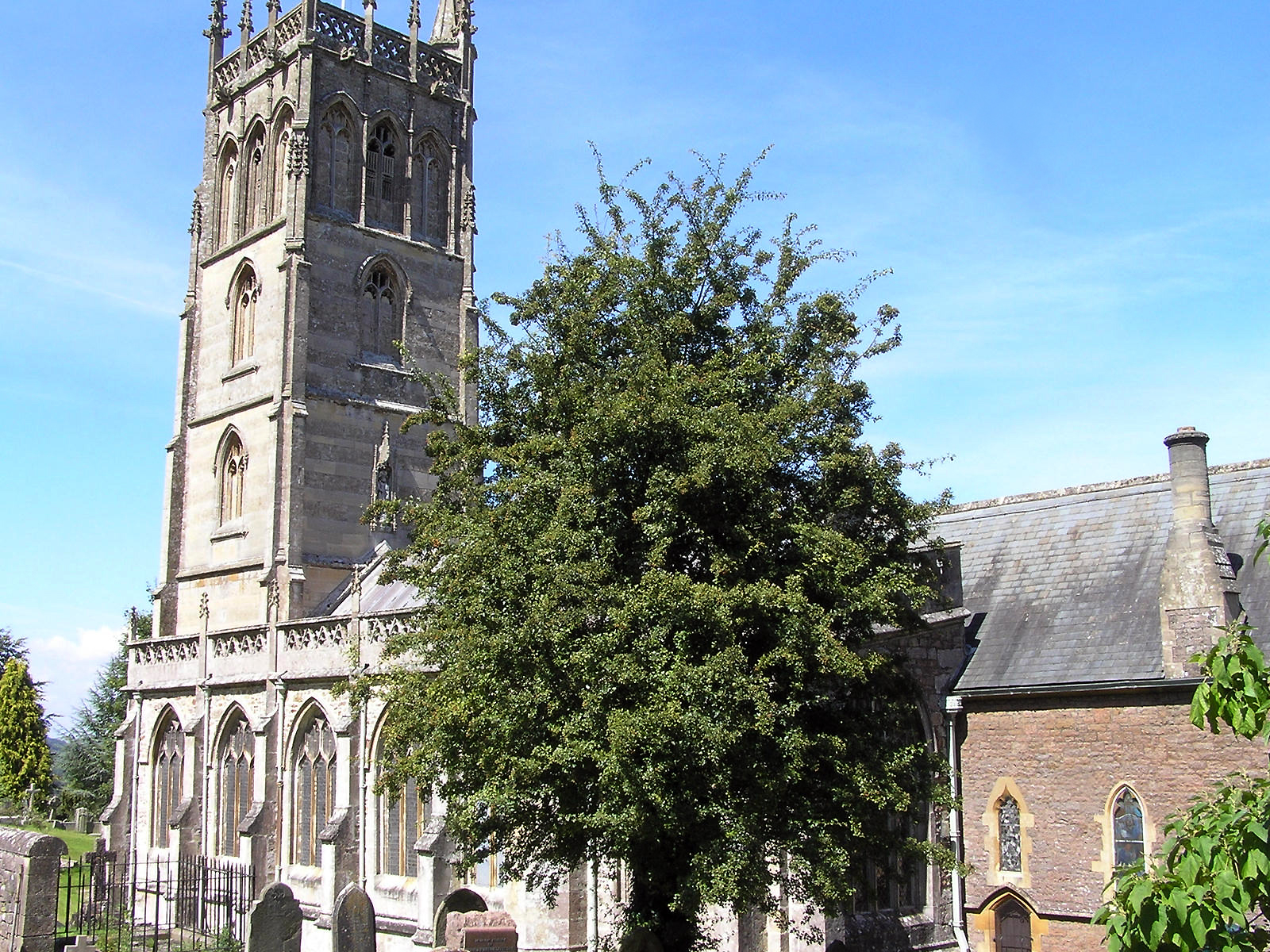
View of the rear of St James the Great, Winscombe

The Church of St James has origins from the 12th century. The church is in the middle of the original hamlet of Winscombe. The church has 13th-century origins but the present building dates mainly from the 15th century, with restoration and a new chancel in 1863. It is designated as a Grade I listed building. The bells of St James have long called people to worship, the original bells being cast in 1773 by local founders the Bilbie family. Two newer bells were added in 1903 by Taylors Founders. The eight bells are in the key of E flat and the tenor weighs 18-1-8 – 18 hundredweight, 1 quarter of a hundredweight and 8 lb (930 kg). St James holds regular services on Sundays, with bell ringing being provided for both the morning service and evensong.

== Culture ==
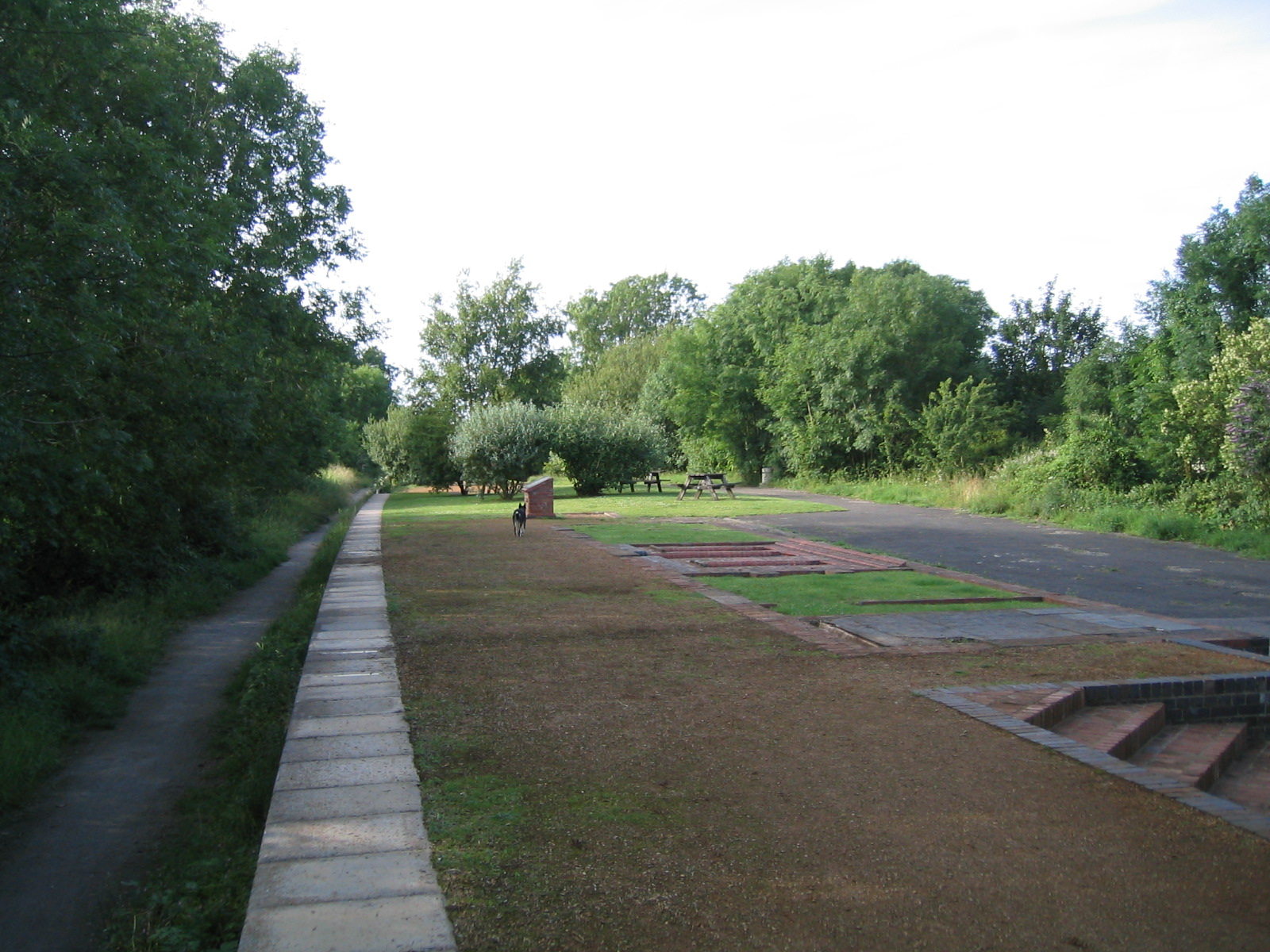
The Millennium Green at Winscombe, on the site of the former railway station

The former railway station site now hosts an annual May fair, on the Saturday closest to May Day, and has a variety of activities, entertainments and stalls selling various products and promoting many local charities and organisations.

In September, the village hosts the annual Michaelmas fair in the community centre, a chance for villagers to show their handiwork, handicraft and produce.

The local headquarters of the Royal British Legion is near the centre of the village in Sandford Road, opposite the village bowls club. It houses the Winscombe Club.

The former British headquarters of Moose International forming Moose International in Great Britain used to be found at Kildare house in the village.

== Notable people ==
- Mick Aston (1946–2013), English archaeologist known for Time Team, died in Winscombe
- William Whicher Cookson (1862–1922), Indian-born English cricketer, died in Winscombe
- Fannie B. Linderman (1875–1960), English-born American teacher, entertainer, and writer
