= UW Health University Hospital =

Hospital in Madison, Wisconsin, U.S.

UW Health Hospital & Clinics
- UW Health
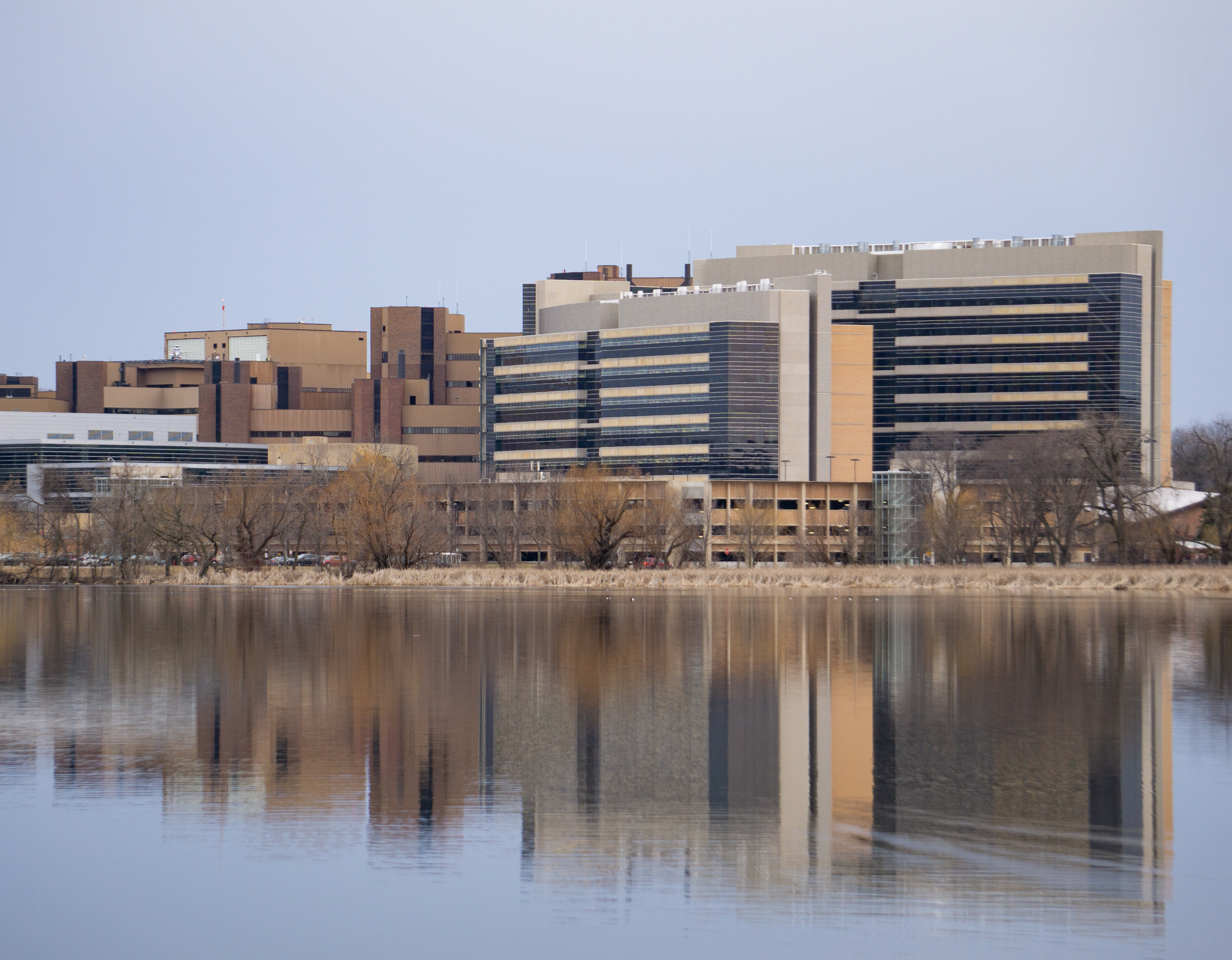
- A view of UW Health University Hospital, the Health Sciences Learning Center, and the Wisconsin Institutes for Medical Research rising above Lake Mendota

Geography
- Location: 600 Highland Avenue, Madison, Wisconsin, United States
- Coordinates: 43.07633°N 89.43075°W

Organization
- Type: Teaching Hospital; Academic Medical Center
- Affiliated university: University of Wisconsin School of Medicine and Public Health

Services
- Emergency department: Level I Trauma Center
- Beds: 614 adult beds (University Hospital); 110 pediatric beds (American Family Children's Hospital)

Helipads
- Helipad: UW Med Flight (IATA: WS27)

History
- Constructed: 1922 and 1974
- Founded: October 14, 1924 (102 years ago)

Links
- Website: www.uwhealth.org
- Lists: Hospitals in the United States

UW Health University Hospital (UW Health, University of Wisconsin Hospital and Clinics or UWHC) is a 614-bed academic regional referral center with 127 outpatient clinics, operated by UW Health, located on the western edge of the University of Wisconsin–Madison's campus in Madison, Wisconsin, United States. It is an American College of Surgeons designated Level I adult and pediatric trauma center, one of only two in Wisconsin.

The hospital is the primary teaching affiliate of the University of Wisconsin School of Medicine and Public Health (whose main building, the Health Sciences Learning Center, is connected to UW Health University Hospital). It is also the primary teaching affiliate of the University of Wisconsin–Madison's School of Nursing and School of Pharmacy, and is a teaching affiliate of Edgewood College's Henry Predolin School of Nursing.

UW Health University Hospital is home to the University of Wisconsin Carbone Cancer Center, one of 40 National Cancer Institute-designated Comprehensive Cancer Centers.

== History ==
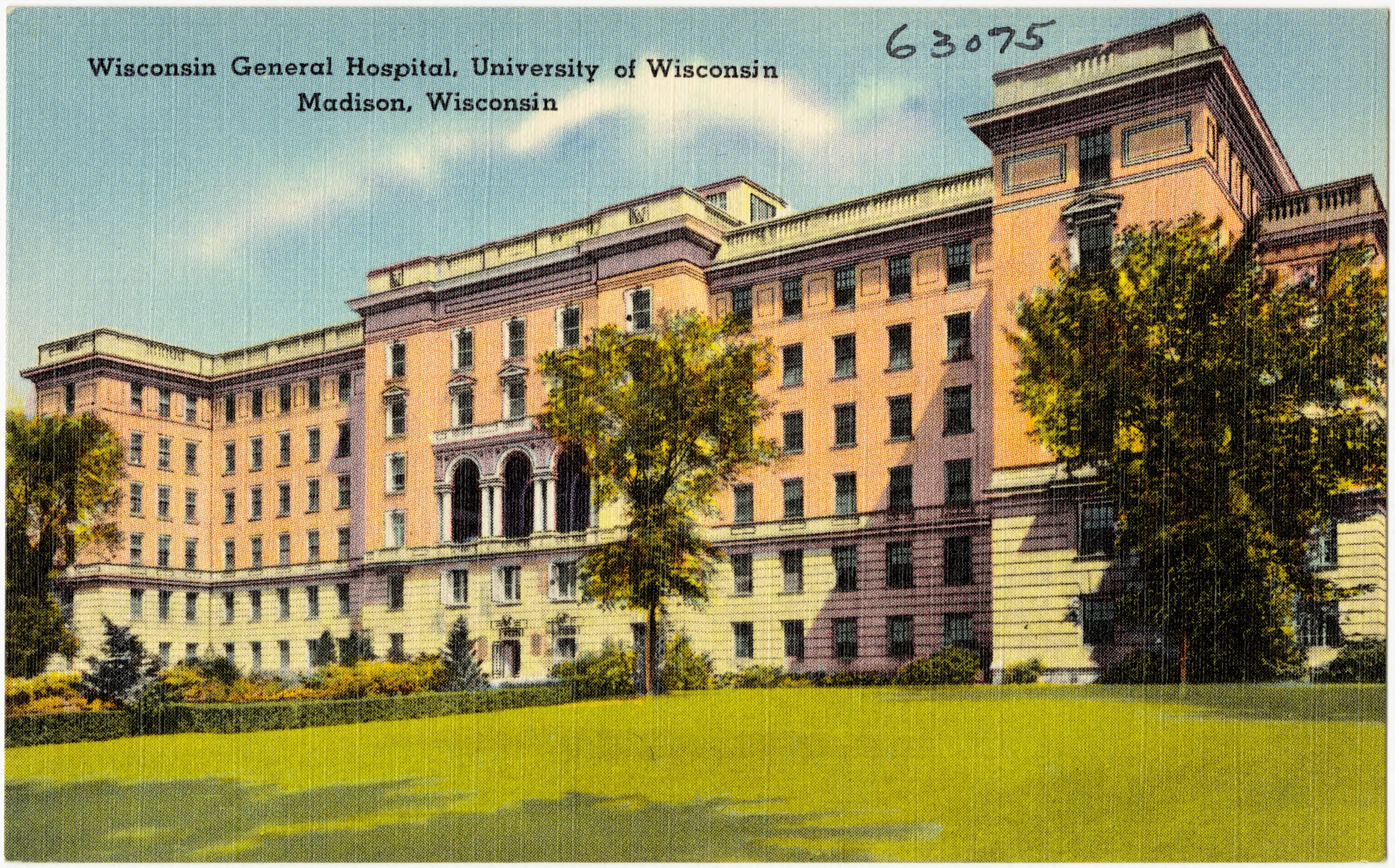
Wisconsin General Hospital in the 1930s. Built in 1924, this building served as the home of UWHC until 1979. It is today known as the Medical Sciences Center and continues to house UW–Madison's physical therapy program and anatomy laboratory, along with several other university departments

Wisconsin General Hospital was established as a teaching hospital, alongside the creation of the University of Wisconsin–Madison's four-year medical school program, by action of the Wisconsin Legislature in May 1920. The foundation was laid for the original hospital building, located at 1300 University Avenue, later that year, but work on the building itself did not begin until 1922. It first accepted patients on October 14, 1924, transferring some from the University's two previous medical facilities, the Bradley Memorial Hospital for children and the student infirmary. Wisconsin General Hospital was officially dedicated, as a memorial to Wisconsin soldiers who had served in World War I, on April 29, 1925.

In its first decades, the teaching hospital almost exclusively provided charity care, for which it was compensated by the state and the home counties of indigent patients. As Wisconsin General Hospital was combined with Bradley Memorial Hospital, the Wisconsin Orthopedic Hospital for Children, and the student infirmary, the collective institution came to be known as the University Hospitals. A major expansion of the University Hospitals was completed in January 1952. By the 1950s, the hospital had begun to provide services that other hospitals in the state did not, leading patients to be referred there from across the state for specialized care. In 1973, the hospital's administrator announced plans to convert it into a true general hospital which would offer more outpatient services and compete directly with the city's other medical centers. The same year, the hospital performed its first heart transplant, was chosen as the location for one of the nation's first Comprehensive Cancer Centers, and broke ground on a much larger replacement for its 50-year-old building.

The current complex, officially known as the Clinical Science Center, was dedicated on February 23, 1979, after five years of construction and over a decade of planning. At the time it was built, it was the largest and most expensive building the state government of Wisconsin had ever constructed, with 1,500,000 square feet (140,000 m^{2}) of floor space and a total cost of $105 million (equivalent to $466 million in 2025). It was built adjacent to the William S. Middleton Memorial Veterans Hospital so that the two hospitals could share facilities, particularly since the Veterans Hospital was at the same time adding a new wing. However, some of the planned Veterans Hospital facilities which the University expected to share, including a rehabilitation medicine center and some radiology specialties, were canceled by April 1977, forcing the University to add an additional wing to the unfinished hospital at an added cost of $6.4 million (equivalent to $34 million in 2025).

The first department to occupy the current building was the UW School of Nursing, which began to move in on December 1, 1977. The hospital's outpatient clinics began moving to the new building on October 4, 1978. Inpatients began to be admitted to the new hospital on March 31, 1979. On the same day, all patients from the old building were wheeled into vans and transported to the new building, including 19 critically ill patients transported in mobile intensive care units.

The facility was further expanded between 1987 and 1989, adding two new modules to the building. The hospital was the first in Madison to entirely ban the smoking of cigarettes within the building in 1991, although this at first proved unenforceable and a room was converted into a smoking lounge, until smoking in hospitals was banned statewide in 1993.

The hospital was operated by the University of Wisconsin–Madison until June 29, 1996, when it was placed under the administration of the newly-created University of Wisconsin Hospital and Clinics Authority, an independent state agency now known as UW Health. The hospital building is still owned by the University, which leases 58 percent of it to UW Health and uses the other 42 percent for instruction, research, and laboratory work.

In 2025 construction began on a new 7 story tower at University Hospital, this project will add a new Medical ICU, Surgical ICU, Medical Intermediate Care unit, a prep-recovery flex bed unit, an expansion of the Emergency Department and Facility Support Services. This project will add a total of 48 inpatient beds, 22 emergency department beds and 22 flexible care beds increasing the UH inpatient bed to count to 662.

== American Family Children's Hospital ==
American Family Children's Hospital (AFCH) is a pediatric acute care hospital located on the University Hospital campus. The hospital has 101 beds and is affiliated with the University of Wisconsin School of Medicine and Public Health. The hospital is a member of the University of Wisconsin Hospital and Clinics. The hospital provides comprehensive pediatric specialties and subspecialties to infants, children, teens, and young adults aged 0–21 throughout Wisconsin and surrounding states. American Family Children's Hospital features the only pediatric Level 1 Trauma Center in the region, and 1 of 2 in the state.

UW Health opened the American Family Children's Hospital on August 29, 2007. The $78 million facility was funded by $41 million in private donations, which included $10 million contributed by American Family Insurance, and $37 million in bonds.

== University of Wisconsin Carbone Cancer Center ==
Located on the University Hospital campus, the UW Carbone Cancer Center is Wisconsin's only Comprehensive Cancer Center, as designated by the National Cancer Institute.

== See also ==
- UW Carbone Cancer Center
- UW Med Flight
