= Churchill, Somerset =

Village and civil parish in Somerset, England

Coordinates: 51.335°N 2.796°W

Churchill
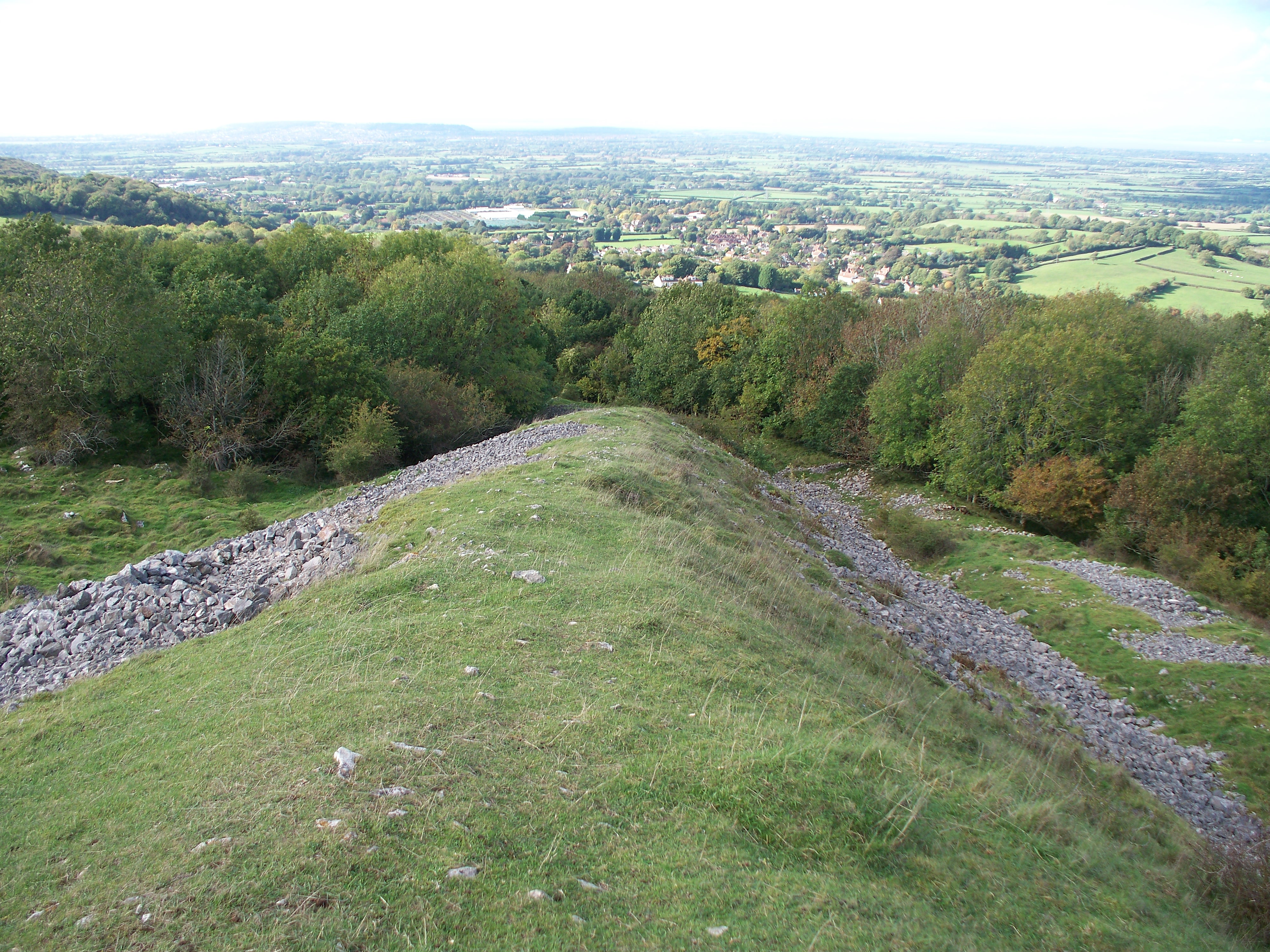
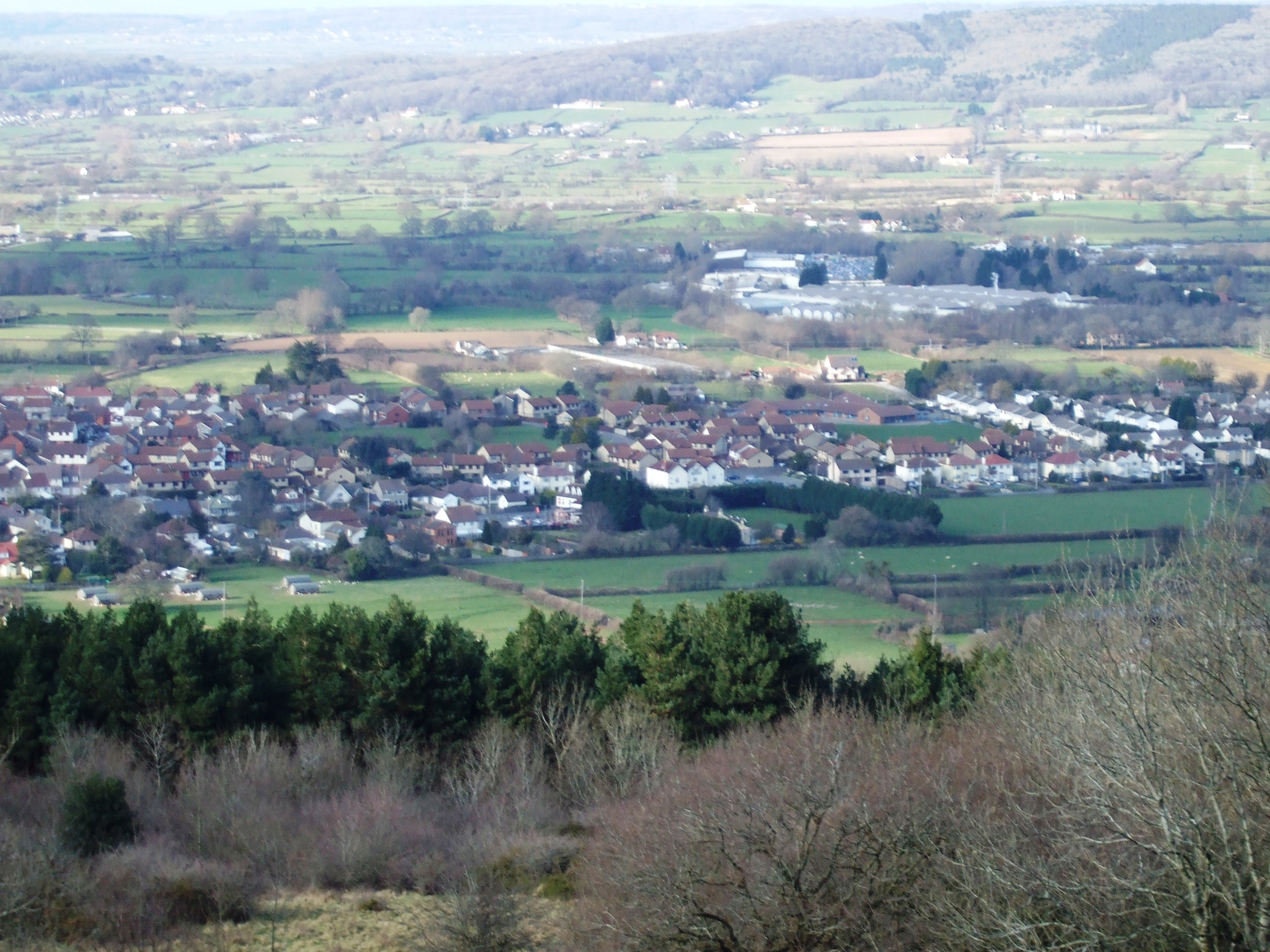
- Churchill village (top) and Lower Langford (bottom) seen from Dolebury Warren

- Location within Somerset
- Population: 2,250 (2015)
- OS grid reference: ST455605
- Civil parish: Churchill and Langford
- Unitary authority: North Somerset
- Ceremonial county: Somerset
- Region: South West
- Country: England
- Sovereign state: United Kingdom
- Post town: WINSCOMBE
- Postcode district: BS25
- Post town: BRISTOL
- Postcode district: BS40
- Dialling code: 01934
- Police: Avon and Somerset
- Fire: Avon
- Ambulance: South Western
- UK Parliament: Wells and Mendip Hills

Churchill is a village and civil parish in North Somerset, England. It lies on the western edge of the Mendip Hills, about 8 miles (12.9 km) east of Weston-super-Mare, and about 15 miles (24.1 km) south-west of Bristol. The parish, which includes the village of Lower Langford and the hamlet of Upper Langford, had a population of 2,250 in 2015.

Although relatively close to large urban centres, Churchill has the character of a small country village. The settlement is around the junction of the A38 and A368 and is overlooked by Dolebury Warren, a biological Site of Special Scientific Interest (SSSI); Windmill Hill to the north; and the Mendip Hills, an Area of Outstanding Natural Beauty (AONB), to the south. Churchill, like many villages, grew around its medieval church, and has many listed buildings reflecting the history of the parish.

== History ==
=== Toponymy ===
The origin of the name Churchill is uncertain. The word "cruc" meaning hillock or peak, survives from Anglo-Saxon as "crook" (Crook Peak), "creech" (Evercreech), "critch" (Critchell Farm near Frome). Consequently, one suggestion is that Churchill derived its name from the hillock which is now known as Windmill Hill at Churchill and became Cruc‑hill or Cric‑hill, often spelt Chirchulle, and later distorted to the more familiar Churchill. Attempts to explain its name by reference to the Norman, Roger de Courcelles, the holder of many manors in Somerset, have been inconclusive. Its origin may be nothing more than the proximity of an earlier chapel or church to Windmill Hill.

=== Pre-history ===
The village is settled around the junction of the A38 and A368 and is overlooked by Dolebury Warren, a biological SSSI. Finds from the site demonstrate an extensive period of occupation, and include Palaeolithic flintwork, Bronze Age pottery, a bronze spearhead and Roman coins and pottery. In addition to the remains of double ramparts of an Iron Age hillfort still being visible there is also evidence of a medieval warren. At Dinghurst, also known as Churchill Batch, is the site of another Iron Age univallate hillfort and Roman fort. The settlement of Dinghurst is located in the south-westerly quarter of the present-day Churchill village. It became part of Churchill parish in 1935.

There is also some archaeological evidence to support Windmill Hill being used in Iron Age and Roman times as a hillfort and look-out point respectively. A prominent feature in the parish, Windmill Hill divides Churchill from Lower Langford, and gained its name from a windmill recorded in Churchill Manor in 1652. There is thought to have been a windmill there as early as the 13th or 14th century when they were first introduced to the region.

=== Medieval ===
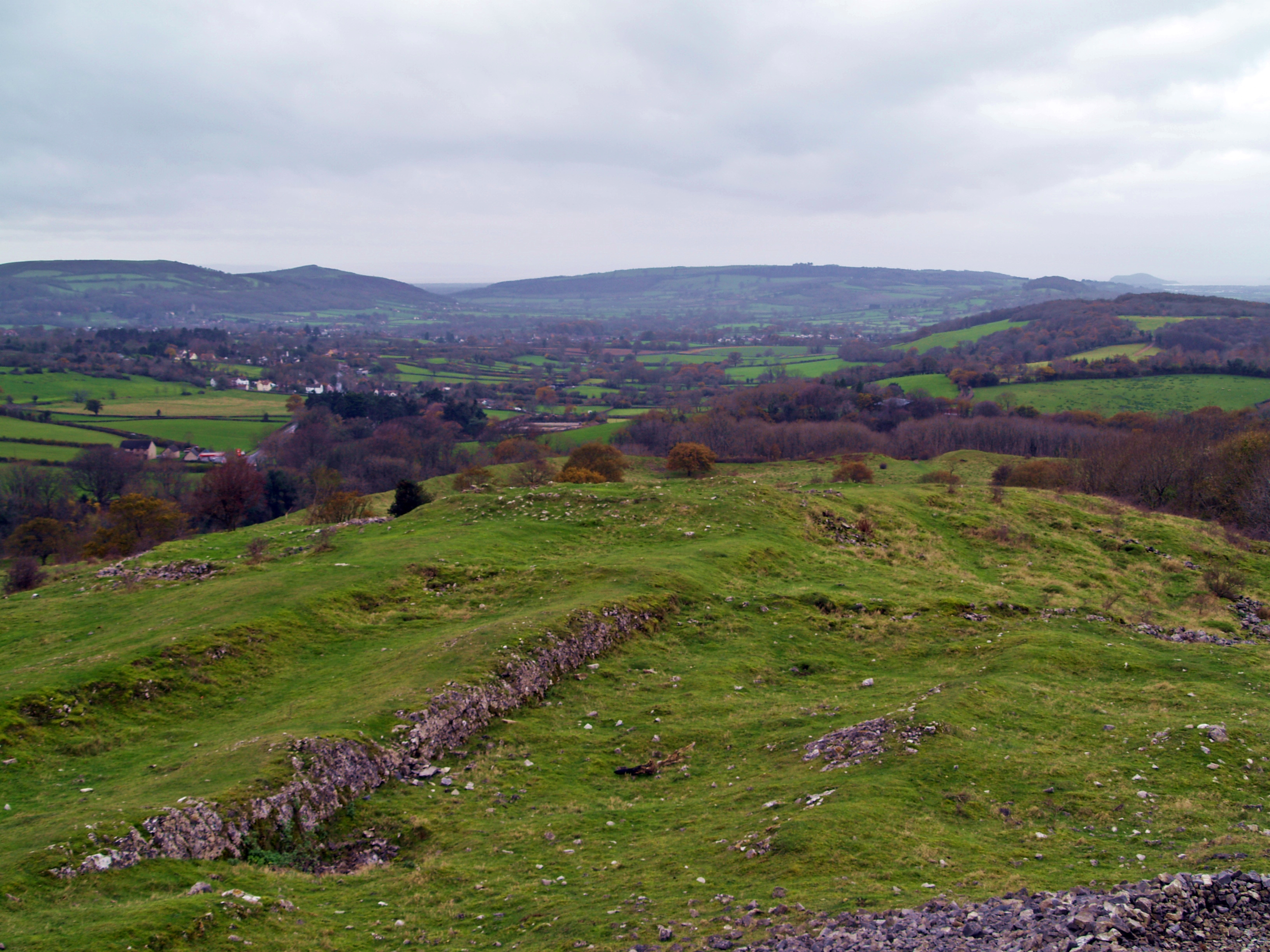
View from Dolebury Warren Hill Fort

The present village of Churchill, together with Lower Langford, has its more populous part either on or in close proximity to the A38 road: Churchill Court, the former manor house, and the Church of St John the Baptist that adjoins it, is isolated on its western edge. Furthermore, Barrow Fields, The Berrys, and Pitchbury, are bare fields in front and beside the church. It has been suggested that the field names are corruptions of the Anglo-Saxon words "burh" or "beorg", meaning townships or mounds of ruined buildings, and that they refer to a medieval settlement now vanished and buried. A large scale map shows a clear pattern of ancient strip fields. Even where later enclosures and the amalgamation of adjoining strips have put hedges around the medieval plots, the lines of these boundaries run at a right-angle to the original strip lynchets and ridge and furrow pattern, both common medieval agricultural practices. In the dry summer of 1996 cropmarks emerged in Barrow Fields, visible from surrounding high ground, showing outlines of dwellings and field boundaries.

There was a settled and developed farming community within Churchill, with the strip fields running out towards the open marshy North Somerset Levels, used for summer grazing, and with drove roads, still existing: Yanel Lane, Sandmead Drove and Common Lane giving access to them. It has been proposed that these droves converged at Churchill Green, the place where cattle, sheep and produce would be conveniently gathered and markets held. Accordingly, there is no clear reason why a village should disappear unless dispossessed by a landlord, anxious to surround his house with a park, or decimated by plague, of which there is no evidence. (Note: Nevertheless, some authors surmise that there are plague pits at Barrow Fields.) It is possible that as wheeled vehicles began to replace the packhorse trains, and traffic grew through the gap in the hills beyond Churchill Gate, (Note: See the construction of the turnpike in the 18th and 19th centuries section.) the eastern end of the settlement grew and the houses around the church were deserted. (Note: The houses would be little more than huts.)

The Domesday survey did not mention Churchill since it was part of the Manor of Banwell, in the Hundred of Winterstoke, belonging to the Bishop of Bath and Wells and not held in fee direct from the King. Churchill is first mentioned as a separate Manor in 1231 in an award made by Bishop Jocelin of Wells concerning the "chapel of Churchill", and in the same document Robert Fitzpayne, (Note: References and source documents spell his name variously as Fitzpayne, Fitzpain, and Fitzpaine.) High Sheriff of Somerset under Henry II, and John de la Stocke, are mentioned as local landowners. Stock Lane still carries the name of the 13th century inhabitant and the Fitzpaynes lived at Churchill Court for some two hundred years.

=== Post-medieval ===
Sir John Churchill, knighted in 1670, purchased the Manor of Churchill from Richard Jenyns in 1671. He died in 1685, greatly in debt, and Churchill Manor, which he left to his daughter Lady Scroggs, was sold, after complicated litigation, with his other property. (Note: Sir John Churchill bought Churchill Court in order to acquire an estate bearing his name; so despite the connection with the Churchill family, the village did not give its name to them or derive it from theirs.) The deer park (Churchill Park) enclosed large swathes of land to the north of the main village, with some of the walls still standing around the boundary. There is also evidence of mills and fishponds associated with the manor.

=== Eighteenth and nineteenth centuries ===
Broad areas of land were enclosed by the inclosure acts in the 18th and 19th centuries. A steep, rocky and untarmacked lane called the Batch was the old Bristol and Exeter coach road, until 1824, when the Commissioners of the Bristol Turnpike Trust determined that they would create a new toll road to avoid the steep incline of the original. A new tollhouse was built and gate installed across Churchill Gate near Four Cross. The new road, now New Road that constitutes part of the A38, joined the Bristol Turnpike road of Winford and was completed by November 1826. Before that year, the toll road passed in front of the inn called the Nelson Arms in the corner of Skinners Lane and Dinghurst Road, and up to the top of the Batch, coming out into the present road again in Star, a hamlet in the parish of Shipham.

== Landscape ==
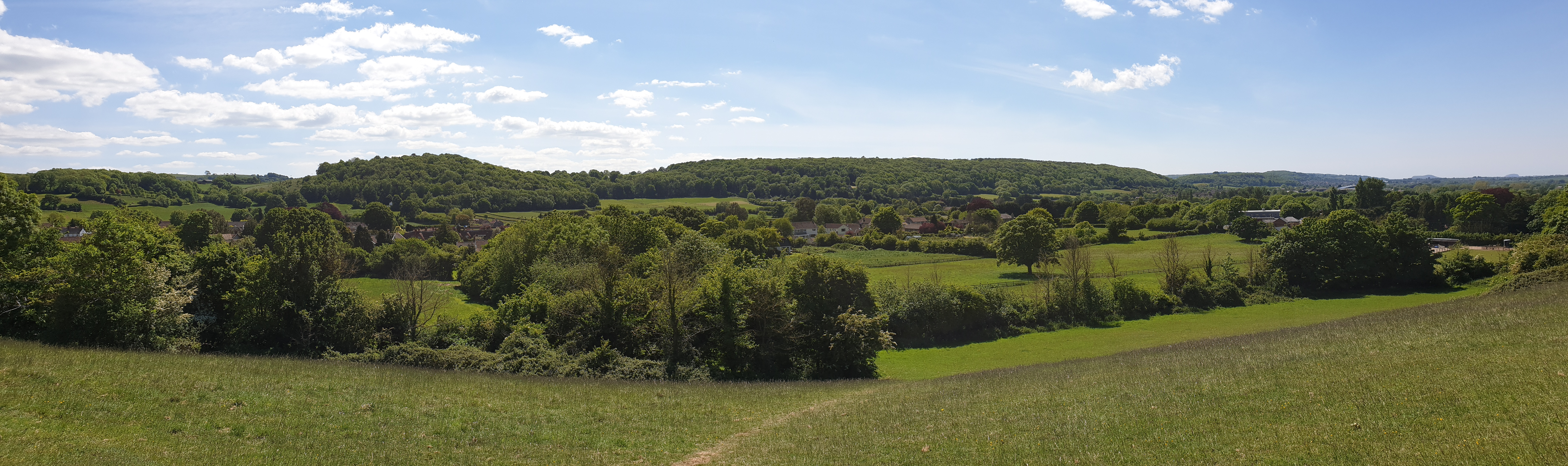
A view of Churchill village from Windmill Hill, with the edge of the Mendip Hills in the background

=== Geography ===
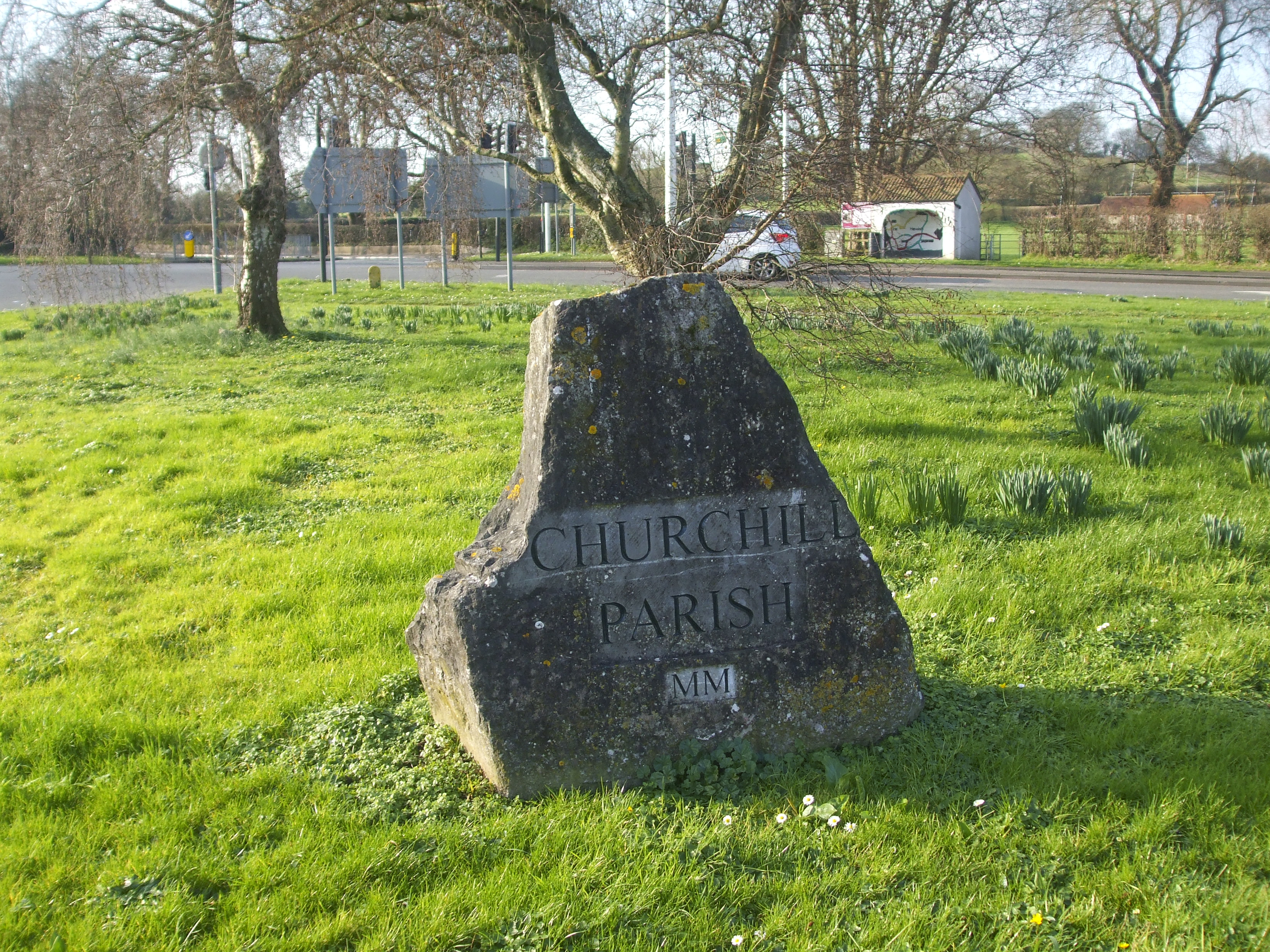
The Millennium stone at Churchill is made of local Mendip stone

The area is predominantly agricultural, with a high proportion of pasture land. The southern border of the parish lies within the Mendip Hills Area of Outstanding Natural Beauty and rises to a height of about 180 metres (600 feet). This southern area is extensively wooded but also contains large areas of open downland. Much of Churchill parish is low lying moorland to the west and north west where it is less than 15 metres (50 feet) above sea level. The lowest part is on the North Somerset Levels where it is only 4.6 metres (15 feet) above sea level. Further north the land descends into the valley of the Congresbury Yeo river which ultimately drains westward into the Bristol Channel between the coastal towns of Clevedon and Weston-super-Mare.

This northern area is sparsely populated and artificially drained, lying almost at sea level, where drainage ditches, or rhynes, replace stone walls and hedges as the field boundaries. The streams, together with the Congresbury Yeo, delineate much of the parish boundary and in the east, the Langford Brook, flowing through Lower Langford, divides that community into two; only the western part being included within Churchill Parish. Windmill hill is 75 metres (246 feet) high and gives good views across the Vale of Wrington, towards the Mendip Hills, the Iron Age hillfort at Dolebury, the Bristol Channel and Wales to the west and towards the Chew Valley to the east. On Dinghurst Road, the views are dominated by the meadows on Lyncombe Hill and the Mendip Hills.

=== Geology ===
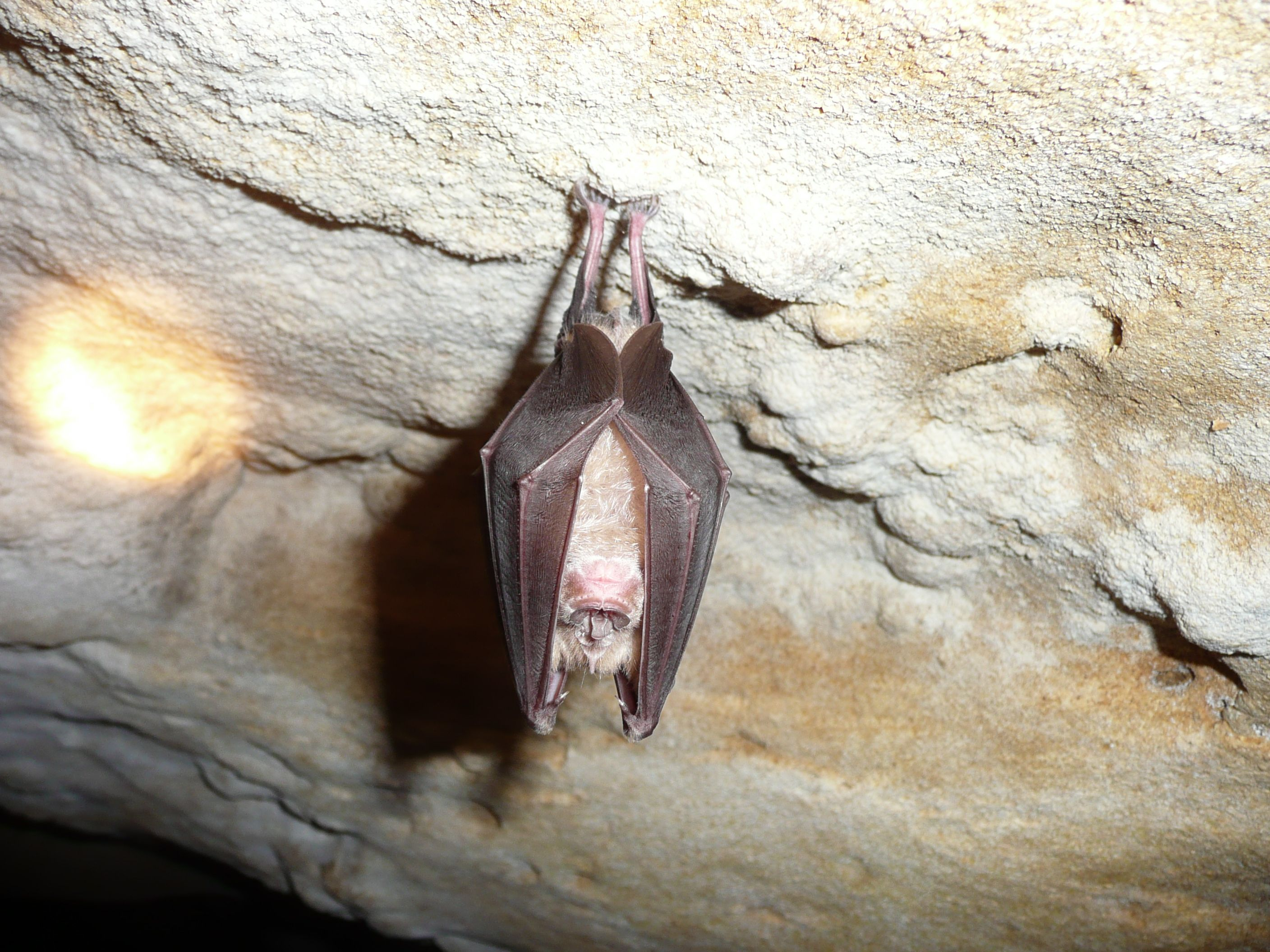
Greater horseshoe bat hanging from the roof of a cave

The land is of the fertile Mercia Mudstone Group, formed of red layers of mudstone and siltstone of Triassic age (see Keuper marl), with peat at the Somerset Levels, giving good pasture on the Mendip Hills. The edge of the hills has Carboniferous Limestone that has been exposed on the Black Down Pericline due to the erosion of the overlying Triassic dolomitic conglomerate. The dolomitic conglomerate and limestone is used in local buildings and walls. A quarry for conglomerate stone was on the north side of Windmill Hill. Mines in Dolebury Warren have sought lead (galena) with silver, iron (hematite), ochre (limonite), manganese (for glass making) and zinc carbonate (calamine); the latter for brass manufacture. Important features like Dolebury Warren and Burrington Combe were formed by the action of water. Like Cheddar they may be collapsed caves or created by meltwater rushing off the hills during the end of glacial periods.

=== Ecology ===
The Mendip Hills supports 3% of the UK population of greater horseshoe bats and internationally significant populations of lesser horseshoe bats. The area also contains internationally important ravine woodland and calcareous grassland interest as supporting features of the bats and also in their own right. In North Somerset, maternity roosts are found at Brockley Hall Stables the King's Wood and Urchin Wood SSSI, and a hibernation roost at Banwell Caves (including a bone cave). Churchill is in close proximity to these maternity and other roosts, and is densely populated with foraging horseshoe bats. The area includes a high proportion of ash woodland, that is used by commuting bats as linear features and feeding perches, but this is under threat from ash die back. Pastoral farming is an important element in the ecology, providing species rich grassland and dung fauna as prey for foraging bats.

In August 1988 a Lower Langford Conservation Area was introduced, from Stock Lane into Burrington parish. There are Sites of Special Scientific Interest at Yanal Bog and the adjacent rhynes, Dolebury Warren, and Mendip Lodge Wood. The latter is also a Site of Nature Conservation Interest, as is the old quarry and grassland at the top of the Batch. The Dolebury Levvy, a tunnel that was mined in 1830 in search of hematite, is a regionally important geological site. (Note: Also known as Dolebury Cavern, Dolebury Adit, Dolebury Lead Adit.)

=== Climate ===
View chart definition.
Mean monthly sunshine hours

Along with the rest of South West England, Churchill has a temperate climate which is generally wetter and milder than the rest of the country. The annual mean temperature is approximately 10 °C (50.0 °F). Seasonal temperature variation is less extreme than most of the United Kingdom because of the adjacent sea, which moderates temperature. The summer months of July and August are the warmest with mean daily maxima of approximately 21 °C (69.8 °F). In winter mean minimum temperatures of 1 °C (33.8 °F) or 2 °C (35.6 °F) are common. In the summer the Azores high-pressure system affects the south-west of England. Convective cloud sometimes forms inland, reducing the number of hours of sunshine; annual sunshine rates are slightly less than the regional average of 1,600 hours.

In December 1998 there were 20 days without sun recorded at Yeovilton, the closest weather station to Churchill with available historic climate data. Most of the rainfall in the south-west is caused by Atlantic depressions or by convection. Most of the rainfall in autumn and winter is caused by the Atlantic depressions, which are most active during those seasons. In summer, a large proportion of the rainfall is caused by sun heating the ground leading to convection and to showers and thunderstorms. Average rainfall is around 700 millimetres (28 inches). About 8 to 15 days of snowfall per year is typical. November to March have the highest mean wind speeds, and June to August have the lightest winds. The predominant wind direction is from the south-west.

Climate data for Yeovilton (1991–2020 normals, extremes 1964-present)
Month	Jan	Feb	Mar	Apr	May	Jun	Jul	Aug	Sep	Oct	Nov	Dec	Year
Record high °C (°F)	16.1 (61.0)	17.7 (63.9)	21.3 (70.3)	25.4 (77.7)	32.9 (91.2)	37.3 (99.1)	35.0 (95.0)	35.5 (95.9)	29.9 (85.8)	26.5 (79.7)	18.5 (65.3)	16.0 (60.8)	37.3 (99.1)
Mean daily maximum °C (°F)	8.6 (47.5)	9.0 (48.2)	11.2 (52.2)	13.9 (57.0)	17.1 (62.8)	19.9 (67.8)	21.9 (71.4)	21.6 (70.9)	19.2 (66.6)	15.3 (59.5)	11.5 (52.7)	9.0 (48.2)	14.9 (58.8)
Daily mean °C (°F)	5.3 (41.5)	5.4 (41.7)	7.1 (44.8)	9.2 (48.6)	12.3 (54.1)	15.1 (59.2)	17.1 (62.8)	16.9 (62.4)	14.6 (58.3)	11.5 (52.7)	8.0 (46.4)	5.7 (42.3)	10.7 (51.3)
Mean daily minimum °C (°F)	2.0 (35.6)	1.8 (35.2)	3.0 (37.4)	4.5 (40.1)	7.4 (45.3)	10.3 (50.5)	12.2 (54.0)	12.2 (54.0)	10.0 (50.0)	7.6 (45.7)	4.4 (39.9)	2.3 (36.1)	6.5 (43.7)
Record low °C (°F)	−16.1 (3.0)	−12.2 (10.0)	−10.0 (14.0)	−6.4 (20.5)	−4.1 (24.6)	0.0 (32.0)	4.4 (39.9)	2.9 (37.2)	−1.8 (28.8)	−4.8 (23.4)	−8.0 (17.6)	−14.2 (6.4)	−16.1 (3.0)
Average precipitation mm (inches)	70.0 (2.76)	50.9 (2.00)	48.5 (1.91)	51.5 (2.03)	47.2 (1.86)	57.1 (2.25)	50.2 (1.98)	60.7 (2.39)	53.3 (2.10)	80.9 (3.19)	81.9 (3.22)	77.4 (3.05)	729.5 (28.72)
Average precipitation days (≥ 1.0 mm)	12.2	10.4	10.0	10.0	9.2	8.7	8.3	9.8	9.1	12.0	13.2	12.9	125.8
Mean monthly sunshine hours	59.5	79.5	121.6	170.5	202.2	199.8	205.3	185.5	149.2	107.6	71.6	53.5	1,605.7
Source 1: Met Office
Source 2: Starlings Roost Weather

=== Demography ===
View chart definition.
Churchill population since 1791. References:
1791, 1801 to 1961, 1971, 1991, 2001, 2011
Note, the census scheduled for 1941 was cancelled due to the war.

The increase in population since 1918 is largely due to the internal combustion engine enabling people to live in Churchill and commute to work elsewhere. After World War II new houses were built around the crossroads and towards Lower Langford. The parish contains two substantial population groupings, Churchill and Lower Langford, and their centres are separated by about a mile. However, beginning in the late 1980s, development of an area lying between these centres has added some 200 new homes, and this development has served substantially to unite the two centres. Nevertheless, Churchill is still an important agricultural area and retains its rural appeal. Consequently, it has now developed into both a retirement area and a dormitory for people working in Weston-super-Mare and Bristol.

According to the 2011 Census, Churchill parish had 2,235 residents, living in 853 households, with a mean age of 42 years. Of these, 85% of residents described their health as 'good' or 'very good'. The area had an unemployment rate of 1.5% of all economically active people aged 16 to 74. Nearly 74% of residents in employment commuted by van or car.

== Governance ==
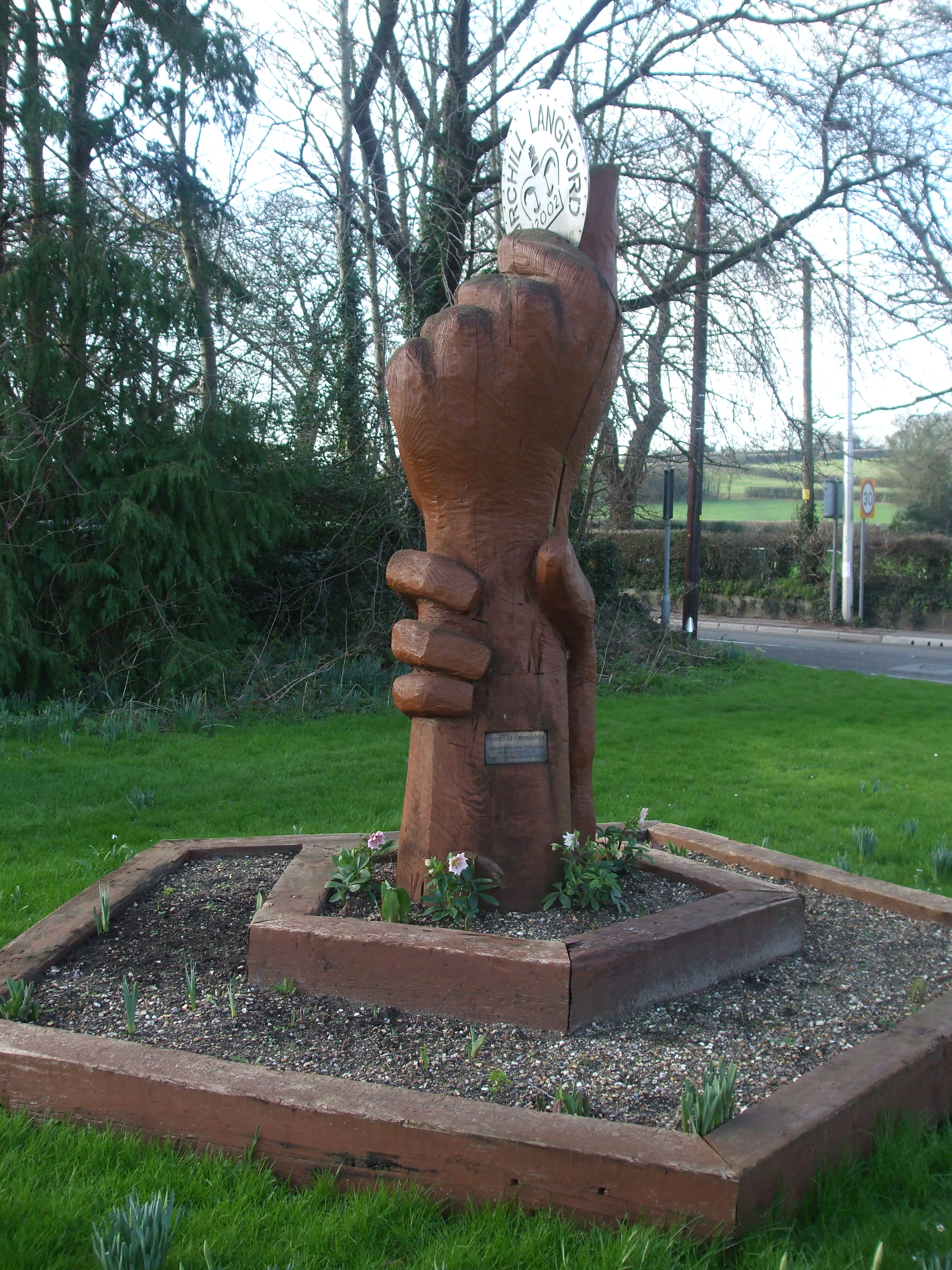
"Hands of Friendship" sculpture made from the Wellingtonia tree planted for Queen Victoria's Diamond Jubilee in 1897

From 1894 to 1974, Churchill was part of the Axbridge Rural District. When this was abolished by the Local Government Commission for England (1992) it became part of the Woodspring district in the new county of Avon. In 1996, this became the North Somerset unitary authority, as established by the Local Government Act 1992, which remains part of the ceremonial county of Somerset. The Blagdon and Churchill ward is represented by one councillor on the North Somerset Council. The parish is represented in the House of Commons of the Parliament of the United Kingdom as part of the Wells and Mendip Hills parliamentary constituency. The current MP is Tessa Munt of the Liberal Democrat party, who won the seat in the 2024 general election.

There are thirteen parish councillors, either elected on a four-yearly basis or co-opted when a vacancy occurs. The parish council has responsibility for local issues, including setting an annual precept (local rate) to cover the council's operating costs and producing annual accounts for public scrutiny. The parish council evaluates local planning applications and works with the local police, district council officers, and neighbourhood watch groups on matters of crime, security and traffic. The parish council's role also includes initiating projects for the maintenance and repair of parish facilities, such as the memorial hall, playing fields and playgrounds, as well as consulting with the district council on the maintenance, repair and improvement of highways, drainage, footpaths, public transport and street cleaning. Conservation matters (including trees and listed buildings) and environmental issues are also of interest to the council.

== Economy ==
Although Churchill is largely a retirement area and a dormitory for people working in Weston‑super‑Mare and Bristol, there is local employment at the University of Bristol Veterinary School, Thatchers Cider in nearby Sandford, and Monaghan Middlebrook, a mushroom agribusiness at Stock Lane. At Ladymead Lane, there is a South Western Ambulance Service station and a BT operations base. The Peartree Industrial Estate, a light industrial park at Upper Langford, hosts a number of long-established businesses, such as Signscape and Signconex, a sign manufacturer, and Skyburst Illuminations, a supplier of firework events and displays. Tourism supports a number of a bed and breakfast establishments, a hotel, several shops and small businesses, and four pubs. There is also the Mendip Vale Medical Practice at Pudding Pie Lane.

== Transport ==
Churchill never had its own railway station. However, a single platform railway station was at the outskirts of Lower Langford on the Wrington Vale Light Railway that connected Blagdon with Yatton via Congresbury, open for passengers from 1901 to 1931. Langford was important for the collection of milk churns and the distribution of coal. On 1 November 1950 the Langford Station closed, the track was lifted in 1952, and the station demolished in 1958. The line from Congresbury to Wrington finally closed on 7 June 1963, the line to Cheddar closed the same year. The lines had several local crossings, one was on the A38, just to the east of Langford Station. The Strawberry Line from Yatton to Shepton Mallet via Wells had a station at Sandford from 1869 to 1963. These and other railways gave bulk access to distant markets and the possibility of introducing mass-produced building materials and farm equipment. The nearest railway station is now at Yatton about 5 miles (8.0 kilometres) away.

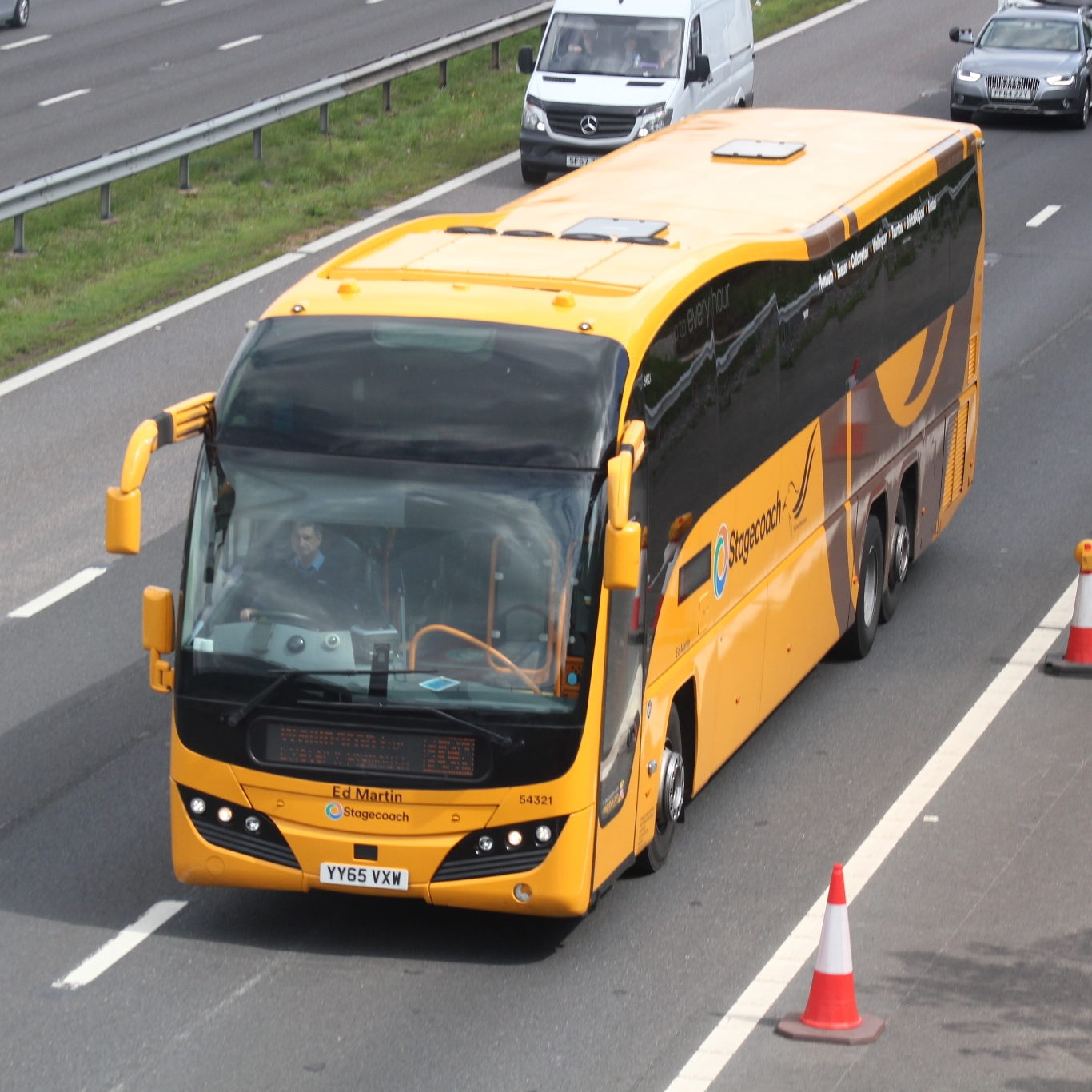
The South West Falcon coach service

Bus services are available to Weston-Super-Mare, Bristol, Wells, Cheddar, Shipham, and a limited number of other destinations. The South West Falcon coach service, connects Devon with Somerset, Bristol Airport and Bristol, and can be boarded from a number of bus stops in the parish. Three heavily trafficked major roads traverse the parish: the A38, the A368 and the B313. Congestion results from the lack of an adequate east to west road link immediately south of Bristol. However, Churchill's proximity to Bristol Airport and Yatton railway station, and to the M5 motorway, junction 21 is 7 miles (11 kilometres), and junction 22 is 10 miles (16 kilometres), make it a good location for people whose work takes them about the country. The Second Severn Crossing adds to mobility and the M4 is 20 miles (32 kilometres) away.

The Churchill and Langford Minibus Society is a community minibus, driven by volunteer drivers, providing transport for the parishes of Burrington, Churchill, Shipham, Banwell, Sandford and Winscombe. The society was founded in 1974 with enough money being raised to begin services by 1975. The driving force behind the society was Arthur Raymond Millard (Ray Millard), a former chairman of Churchill Parish Council, who was also responsible for restoring the Jubilee Clock Tower at Churchill from 1976 to 1977. Anyone who has need of transport, both able-bodied and disabled, is eligible for membership. The society currently runs a 10-seater minibus, adapted with an electric ramp for access, which takes people from the villages into Weston-super-Mare eight times a fortnight. It also takes people to Winscombe, Wrington, Worle, Clevedon, Yatton, Wells and Nailsea, runs monthly trips to the Curzon Community Cinema, Clevedon and other social outings. The society was awarded a grant from the Government Community Transport fund in 2017 allowing the society to purchase the current minibus. The grant was awarded on the basis that, in addition to their existing scheduled service, the society would provide community transport for the Parish of Sandford and Winscombe. The minibus is also used by The Good Companions scheme that aims to reduce social isolation in the community.

== Education ==
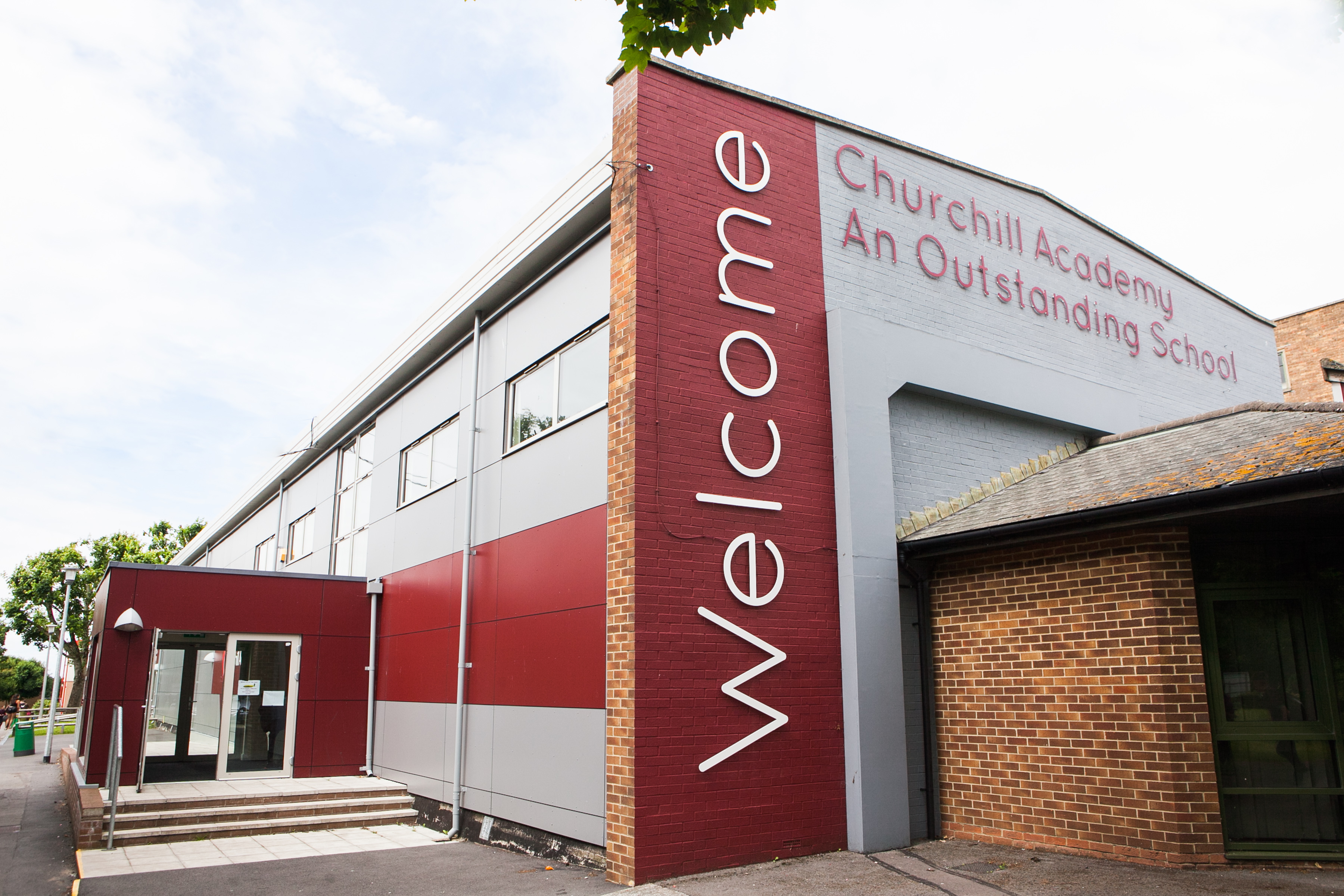
Churchill Academy and Sixth Form exterior

There are two schools within the parish: a Church of England Voluntary Controlled (CEVC) primary school, serving both Churchill and Langford, and Churchill Academy and Sixth Form, a large state-run secondary school and specialist arts college, serving nearby villages in North Somerset. Churchill Academy, opened in January 1957 as a secondary modern school, has around 1,550 students between the ages of 11 and 18 years and is located on Churchill Green. Facilities include the sixth form centre, cafeterias and the neighbouring Churchill Sports Centre with playing fields.

Churchill Primary School has around 200 pupils aged 4 to 11 years and is located in the adjacent village of Lower Langford. It was newly built in 2002 after relocating from its former location at Ladymead Lane. Langford House, built in the middle of the 19th century, is now the location of the University of Bristol Veterinary School, with around 650 undergraduate and postgraduate students and 300 staff. About half of the veterinary students live on site, or in surrounding villages, and others reside in Bristol.

== Religious sites ==
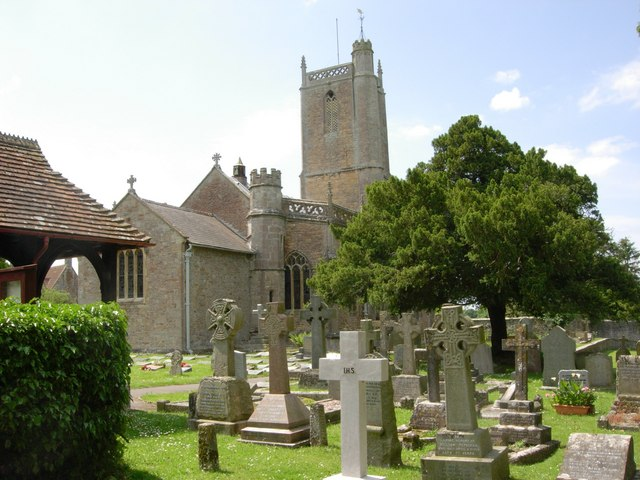
Church of St John the Baptist

The church of St John the Baptist was built around 1360 and restored in 1879. There may have been a cell or chapel on the present site of the church long before 1180, when the Bruton Cartulary recorded one Robert, Chaplain of Churchill. Among the remains of Robert's Norman building is the spherical bowl of the font and possibly the fascia stone of a sundial built, upside down, into the wall of a stairway in the south aisle of St John the Baptist. In about 1290 the south aisle was built, with a mortuary chapel, including an altar, hagioscope and piscina, at the east end for the Fitzpayne family. This was entirely rebuilt in the years 1390 to 1418. Later in the 15th century, the north aisle was erected, and later, the western tower was completed, probably in 1486, by Sir Nicholas St Loe, Lord of the manor.

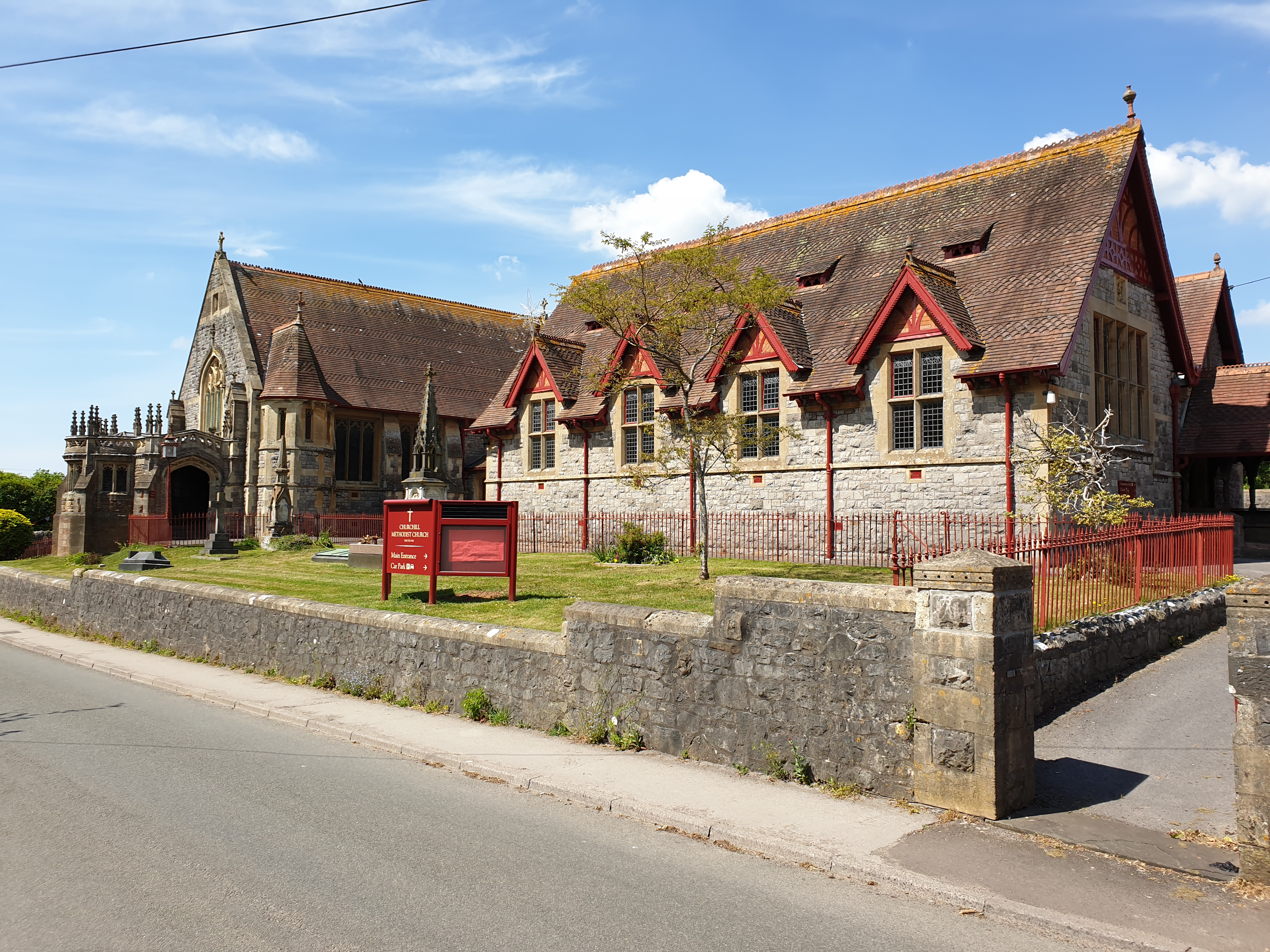
Churchill Methodist Church

The tower has three stages with diagonal buttresses, moulded string courses, north-east polygonal higher corner stair turret with blind panelled embattled cap and pierced quatrefoil lozenge parapet with corner pinnacles and gargoyles. The oak screen beneath the tower arch commemorates the Golden Jubilee of Queen Victoria. In the chancel is the memorial to Sir John Latch of Upper Langford Court, newly returned from the Second Battle of Newbury in 1644. On the east wall of the south aisle are the arms of Sir John Churchill and his wife Susanna (Prideaux). The six bells, range through the centuries from 1520 to the recasting of a 1725 bell in 1938.

There is also a Methodist Church that was built in 1880 by Sidney Hill, a local businessman and benefactor, as a memorial to his wife. It was designed by Foster & Wood, Bristol, of Perpendicular Gothic style, and opened on 2 May 1881. Sidney Hill made his fortune in South Africa after giving up his intended journey to New Zealand. He was in Port Elizabeth in 1857 to 1874, and again after the death of his wife, returning finally in 1877 when he bought Langford House and estate, now the University of Bristol School of Veterinary Science.

== Landmarks ==
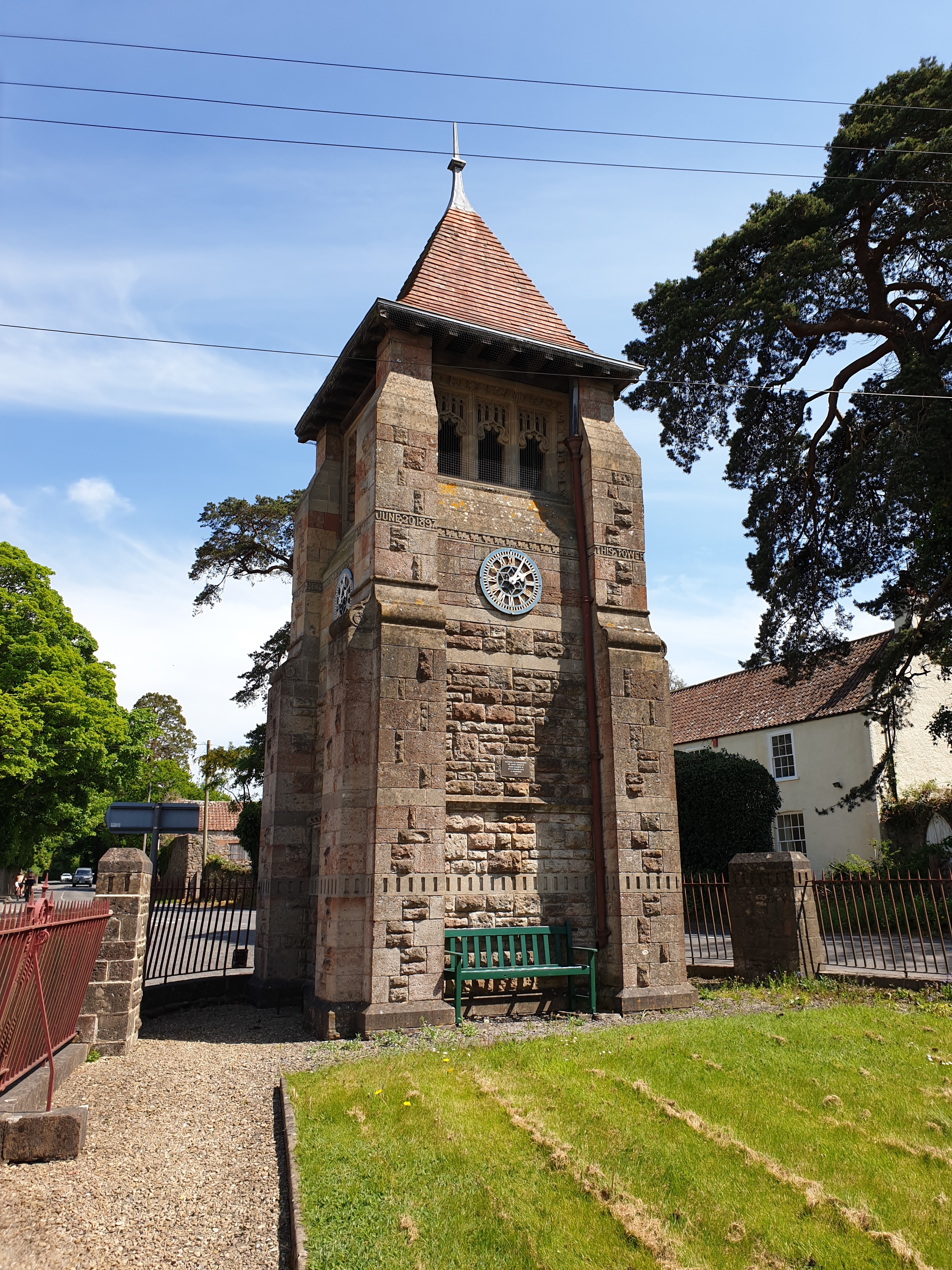
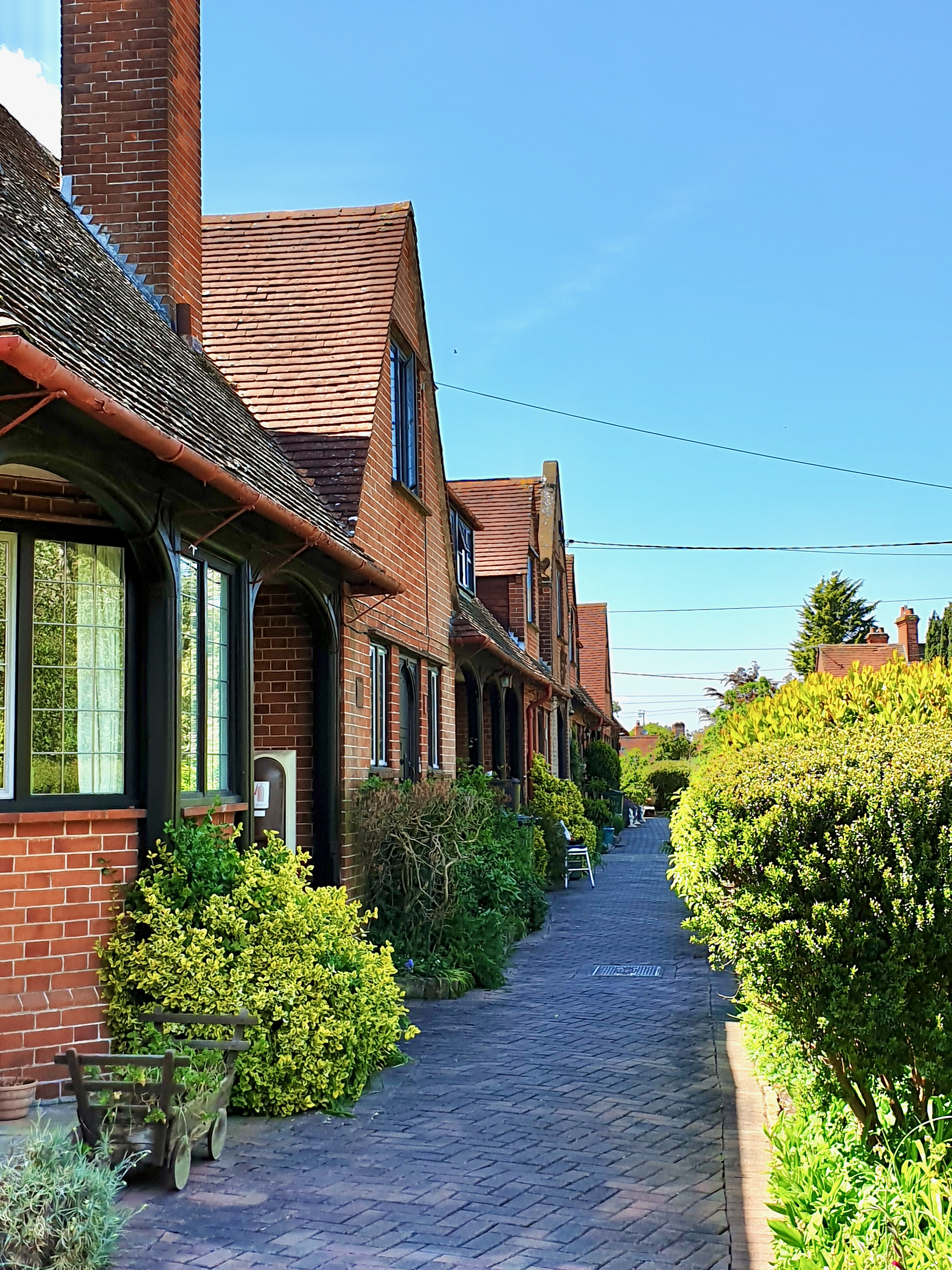
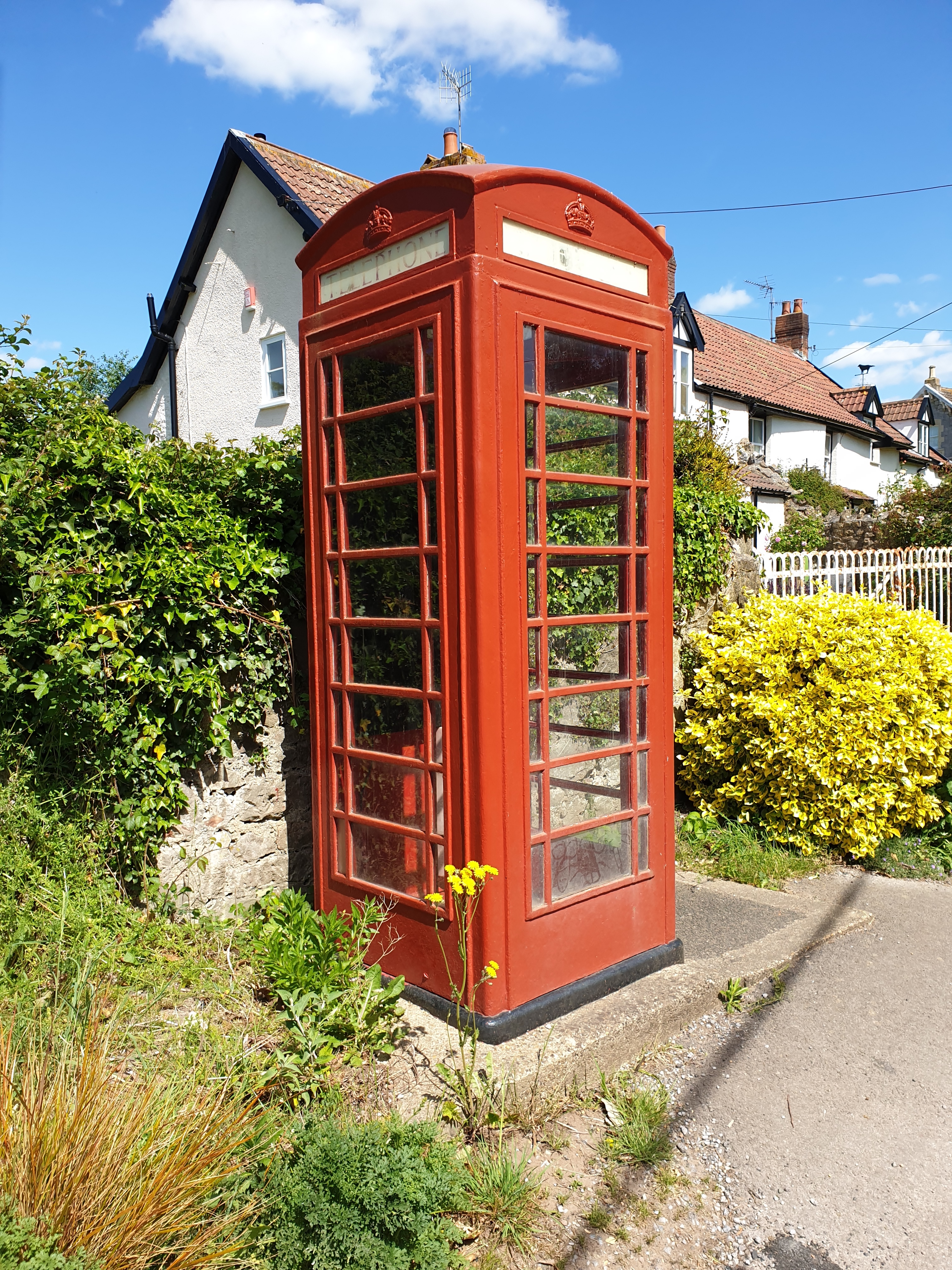
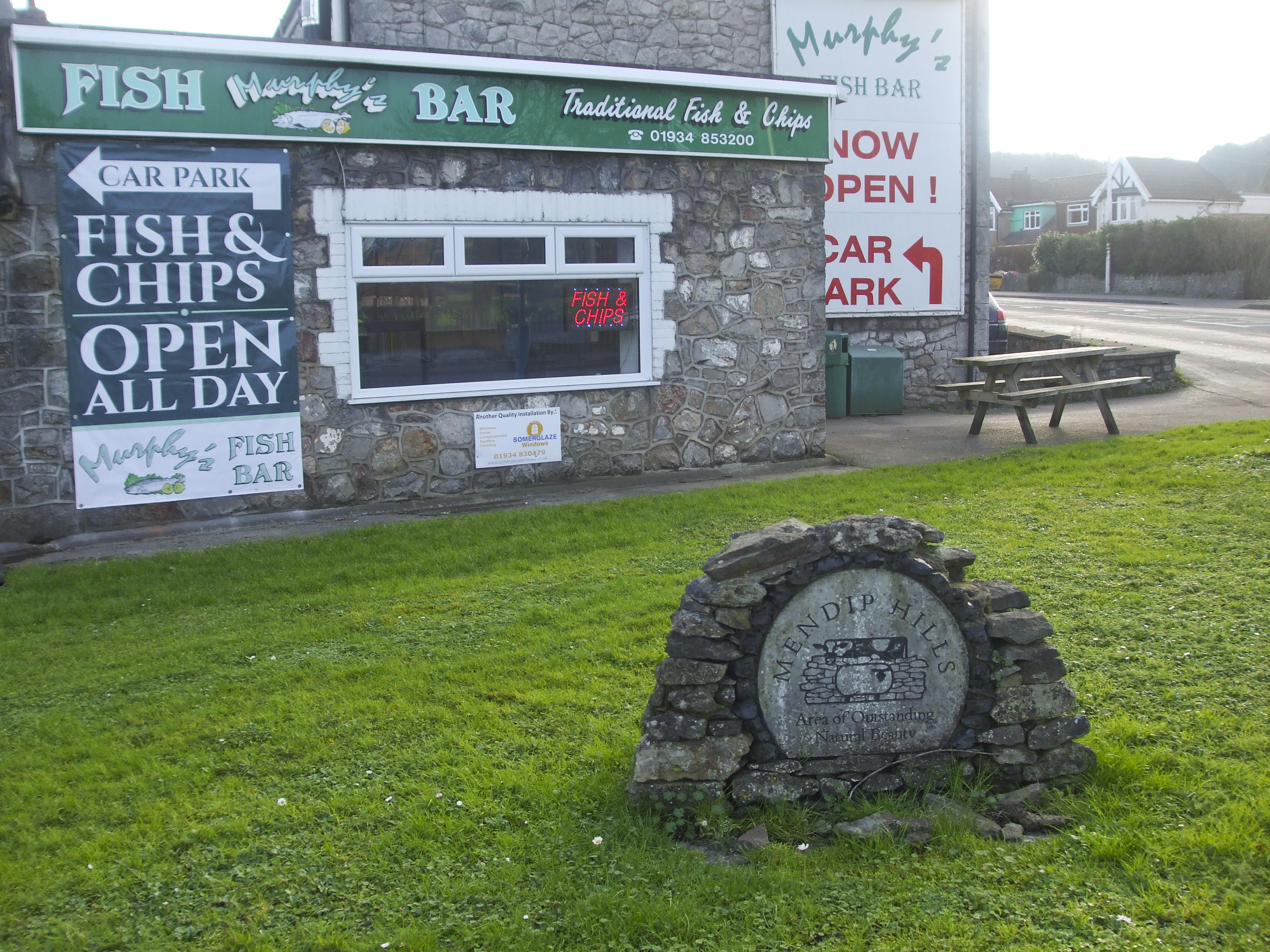
The Jubilee Clock Tower, Sidney Hill Cottage Homes, red telephone box in Churchill village, and the Mendip Hills AONB sign

Apart from Churchill Court, which has its roots in earlier times, there are houses within the parish which date from the 17th and 18th century. One of the oldest houses is reputed to be Over Langford Manor, now known as The Old Courthouse, in Upper Langford. The original house was built in the 16th century, although there appears to be no record of the building being erected, but names of several tenants or owners are known. Of these, Thomas Latch died there in 1598, and there were other members of the family, notably Sir John Latch who became High Sheriff of Somerset in 1627 and lived in the house from 1610.

Mendip Lodge was an Italianate mansion, that was situated in Upper Langford on the steep north slope, with a veranda 26 metres (85 feet) long. It was built in 1787 by the Reverend Dr Thomas Sedgwick Whalley, who married the wealthy heiress of nearby Langford Court. A spendthrift who entertained lavishly, both at Langford and at his house in the Royal Crescent, Bath, within ten years he was forced to let Langford Court and began to build Mendip Lodge at a reputed cost of £60,000. Although built on the steep hillside, an ascent for carriages was made by cutting a new road winding through the woods. From this numerous footpaths led to scenic spots, including 52 grottoes, one for every week of the year, one of which led to the Church of Holy Trinity, Burrington, and a great number of trees and ornamental shrubs were planted, many of which remain in the area. After various changes of occupation it fell into disrepair and decay. It was destroyed deliberately by Civil Defence activities. All that remains is the ruined stable block.

The Jubilee Clock Tower was built to commemorate Queen Victoria's Diamond Jubilee of 1897 and was erected at the expense of Sidney Hill. It stands on a plot between Dinghurst Road and Front Street, and is a prominent landmark at the entrance to the village. It was designed by Joseph Foster Wood of Foster & Wood, Bristol, of perpendicular Gothic style, and is made of local stone. In 1977, for the Queen's Silver Jubilee, the tower was cleaned by Ray Millard and a team of volunteers.

Sidney Hill Cottage Homes was opened in December 1907 to provide furnished accommodation for people in need. Designed in an Arts and Crafts vernacular style by Thomas Ball Silcock and Samuel Sebastian Reay of Silcock and Reay, architects at Bath and London, twelve cottages were constructed on three sides of a quadrangle, with landscaped gardens. A large stone sundial, with a spreading base, is set in the centre of the quadrangle. In their original form, each house had a living room, with a small scullery, larder, coal house, and one bedroom with a large storeroom. Sidney Hill paid for the construction costs and endowed a fund to maintain the homes.

== Arts ==
Churchill Music is a music charity based in Churchill that is known for bringing leading musicians, such as cellist Sheku Kanneh-Mason, to perform for local people, but also for its commitment to music education. As well as staging five professional concerts each year, the charity is involved in education initiatives. These include:

- A project in primary schools that uses music to manage mental health issues.
- A film narrated by actor John Hannah about the importance of music in primary schools.
- A secondary school project that allows GCSE music students to have their compositions coached and performed by leading musicians.
- A Young Musician of the Year competition, that was last adjudicated in 2019 by Susana Stranders from the Royal Opera House.

The charity won recognition in the arts world by being awarded the St George's Bristol Prize for Music in 2019. The prize is intended "to recognise and celebrate groups, individuals or organisations who make an outstanding contribution to music within their local community.

Mendip Swing is a not-for-profit big band which provides local musicians with an opportunity to develop their musical skills. Their aims are:

- To provide a local facility for musicians seeking to experience and enhance their ability to play jazz, swing and rhythm and blues in a big band.
- Develop personal playing ability and maintain a high standard of musicianship.
- Seek public performance opportunities.

The band rehearses once a week at St Mary's Church, Langford. Their repertoire covers a broad spectrum, from styles associated with the likes of Count Basie, Buddy Rich, Duke Ellington and Glenn Miller, music from musicals and film themes, smooth ballads, Latin and some funk. The band has played at a variety of charitable events, supporting Macmillan Cancer Support, Youth at Heart, Mend the Gap, and local youth groups.

== Sport and recreation ==
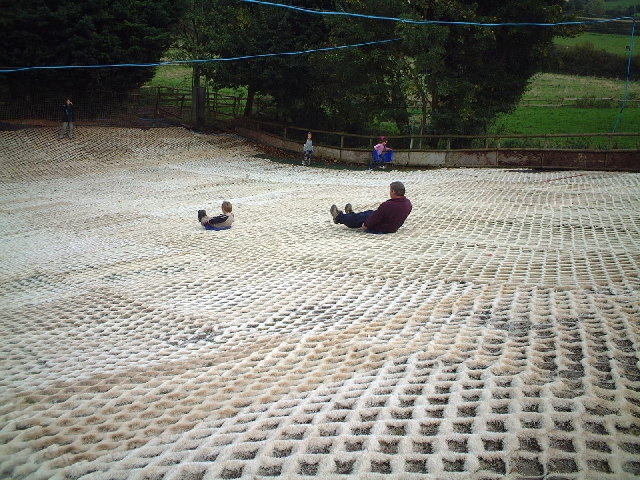
The dry ski slope at the Mendip Snowsport Centre

The village has a post office with shop and tea rooms, allotments at Pudding Pie Lane, and a number of active walking groups. There are four pubs serving the area: The Crown Inn, The Nelson Arms, The Stag and Hounds, and The Churchill Inn. Churchill Parish lacks a social centre because its population is scattered, and only loosely based on two small villages, which themselves have few amenities. The memorial hall stands at the geographical centre of the Parish, opposite the former primary school at Ladymead Lane, and behind the original location of the Mendip Vale medical practice. It was built in opened in 1925 with funds raised by public subscription after the First World War. The tennis courts on the ground behind the hall have now disappeared, but the skittle alley adjacent to the hall, which was presented to the Royal British Legion by Vera Wills (a member of the Wills tobacco family) in 1937, has a thriving club. The land behind the memorial Hall contains a children's play area, cricket and football pitches.

The sports centre is on a site shared by Churchill Academy and Sixth Form, and during term time, is open in the evenings. In the school holidays, however, it is open all day. There is a heated indoor swimming pool, as well as a variety of facilities for sports, both indoors and outdoors. However, the centre has been shut since March 2020 due to the coronavirus pandemic. North Somerset Council has been working with current operators Greenwich Leisure Limited to look at ways of re-opening the centre, but the small venue with its narrow corridors, has made it difficult to put the necessary social distancing measures in place. The nearby Mendip Snowsport Centre has a 165 metres (541 feet) metre dry ski slope, one Mogul run, three nursery slopes, and an outdoor pursuits centre.

== Notable people ==
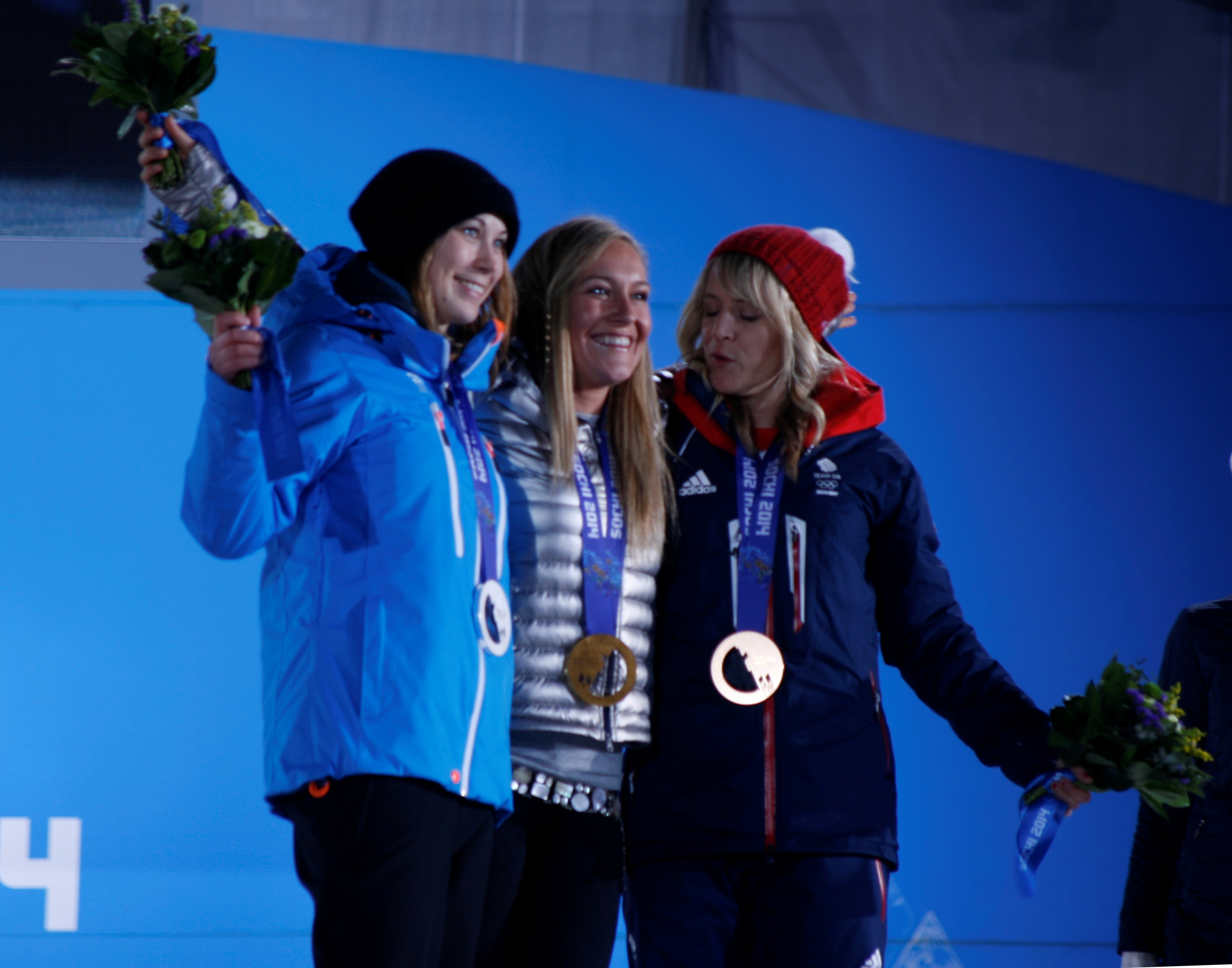
Jenny Jones (right) on the podium at the 2014 Winter Olympics

- Ruby Harrold, Olympic gymnast.
- Sidney Hill (1829–1908), a local benefactor who made his fortune trading from South Africa.
- Jenny Jones, Britain's Olympic snowboarding medallist trained on the dry ski slope at the Mendip Activity Centre. She was the first Briton to win an Olympic medal for a snow event.
- Stefanie Martini, television actor, who has starred in shows Doctor Thorne (2016), Emerald City (2017) and Prime Suspect 1973.
- George Perry (1820–1897), churchman and academic, known as a church historian and Archdeacon of Stow.
- Anne Phillips (1803–1862), geologist.
- Chris Sherwin (1962–2017), veterinary scientist and senior research fellow at the University of Bristol Veterinary School in Lower Langford.
- Field Marshal Sir Lintorn Simmons (1821–1903), British Army officer.

== In popular culture ==
On 18 November 1940, American magazine Life published a major feature on the village and its residents. It was intended as an American wartime propaganda exercise to show the world "the secret of British courage under the German bombs" and sought to gain American support for the British war effort. Included were many photographs taken by Cecil Beaton. In December 1940, Pathé News followed-up the article with a short film on village life in Churchill.

In 1996, Raw Charm Productions of Cardiff produced a three-part television series titled Here's Looking at You, on Langford and Churchill parish, for broadcast by HTV in May 1997. Each 25 minute episode charted events in the life of the parish of Churchill in the twentieth century using film footage and personal testimonies. Episode 1 explored village life up to the start of the Second World War using film footage shot by Thomas Sidney Hill (known as the "second Sidney Hill"), the then occupier of Langford House. (Note: See the Langford History Group in § External links to view some of Thomas Sidney Hill's film footage.) Residents reminisced about village life, and Thurle Albury Harris, née Hill, the then only surviving child of Thomas Sidney Hill, spoke about life at Langford House. Episode 2 examined the war years, the impact of evacuees on the village, working women, and intensive farming. Sam Warren, one of then oldest residents of the village, recalled his farming and war years. The final episode saw the village trying to settle down to life after the war. Thomas Sidney Hill had died in 1944 and Langford House had been sold, and machinery did away with the need for farm labourers. Car ownership had expanded and this had allowed people to live in Churchill but commute to work.

During the fifth episode of series three of Top Gear, Jeremy Clarkson crashed a Toyota Hilux into an oak tree in the car park of St John the Baptist Church. The churchwarden had presumed that the damage had been accidental until the Top Gear episode was broadcast. After the BBC was contacted, the programme director admitted guilt and the broadcaster paid compensation.
