= Banwell Ochre Caves =

Caves in Somerset, England

- Site of Special Scientific Interest
- Location within Somerset
- Location of Banwell Ochre Caves.
- Area of search: Avon
- Grid reference: ST407593
- Coordinates: 51.3297°N 2.8525°W
- Interest: Geological
- Area: 12.46 ha (30.8 acres)
- Notification date: 1983

Banwell Ochre Cave
- Interactive map of Banwell Ochre Cave
- Location: Banwell
- Depth: 12 m (39 ft)
- Length: 62 m (203 ft)
- Geology: Limestone
- Cave survey: Mendip Cave Registry & Archive: (1) and (2)

Banwell Ochre Caves (grid reference ST407593) are a 12.46-hectare geological Site of Special Scientific Interest near the village of Banwell, North Somerset, notified in 1983.

There are five caves in total which contain the most extensive and accessible yellow ochre workings in the Mendip Hills. A wide variety of ochre types and iron hydroxides (limonites) can be examined in situ, and the evidence of their accumulation as residual ore-bodies associated with Ice Age (Pleistocene) sediments is clearly visible. The caves are also a nesting site for the Horseshoe bat a protected species.

The caves were first exploited for ochre mining in the 1930s and worked until 1948.

Cave one is 62 metres (203 ft) long, Cave two 154 metres (505 ft), cave three 92 metres (302 ft) cave four 62 metres (203 ft) and cave five 31 metres (102 ft) long. A small additional cave is choked with rocks at a depth of 4 metres (13 ft).

== See also ==
- Banwell Caves
- Caves of the Mendip Hills
