= River Banwell =

River in Somerset, England

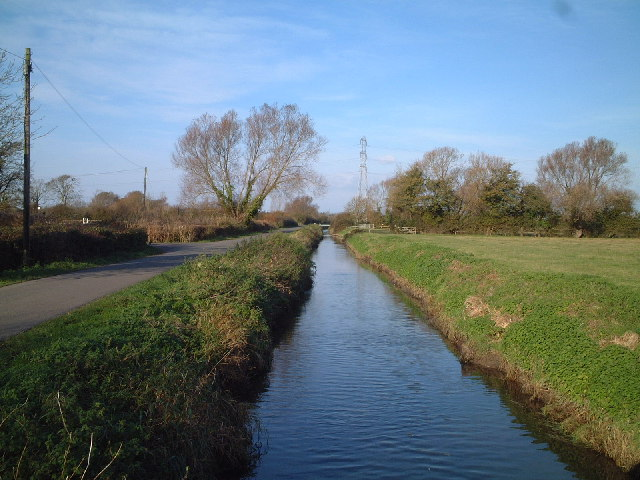

Location
- Country: England
- County: Somerset
- Cities: Banwell, Weston-super-Mare

Physical characteristics
- Source
  - location: Banwell, Somerset, England
  - coordinates: 51°19′37″N 2°51′50″W
- Mouth: St Thomas's Head
  - location: Bristol Channel, Somerset, England
  - coordinates: 51°23′26″N 2°55′58″W

The River Banwell is a small river in Somerset, England.

It begins life as a series of springs near the Church of St Andrew in Banwell where they once filled a large pool below the church. It then flows north east of Weston-super-Mare and on to Woodspring Bay where it enters the Bristol Channel, at St Thomas's Head, which forms the eastern boundary of Sand Point and Middle Hope, a short distance from Woodspring Priory.

Through an Act of Parliament, and despite local protests, the Banwell springs were capped in 1915 and the pool slowly dried up. The water became part of the Weston Water Company's supply. Thereafter the old pool was filled in and became the village bowling green.

Flooding has occurred on Banwell Moor, despite previous canalisation, and feasibility studies have been carried out to see if this could be managed to reduce the risk of floods in the Weston-super-Mare area.
