= Churchill Academy and Sixth Form =

Churchill Academy & Sixth Form

Location
- Churchill Green; Churchill, North Somerset; England; 51°20′13″N 2°48′43″W

Information
- Type: Academy
- Motto: Kindness, Curiosity, Determination
- Established: 1956
- Department for Education URN: 137000 Tables
- Ofsted: Reports
- Head teacher: Chris Hildrew
- Gender: Mixed
- Age: 11 to 18
- Enrolment: 1,537 (Years 7-11) + 287 Sixth Form as of 2025
- Website: http://www.churchill-academy.org/

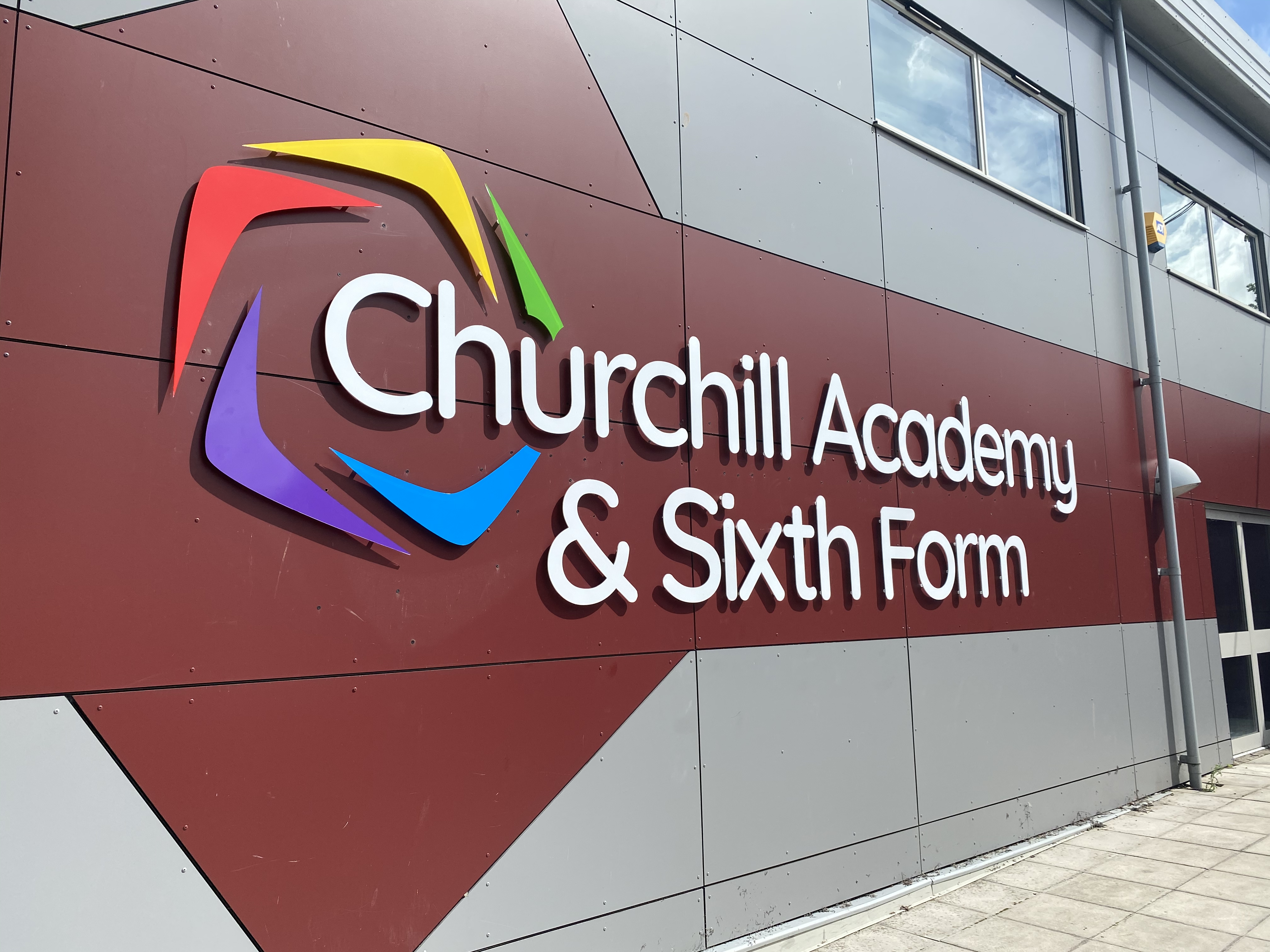
Churchill Academy & Sixth Form

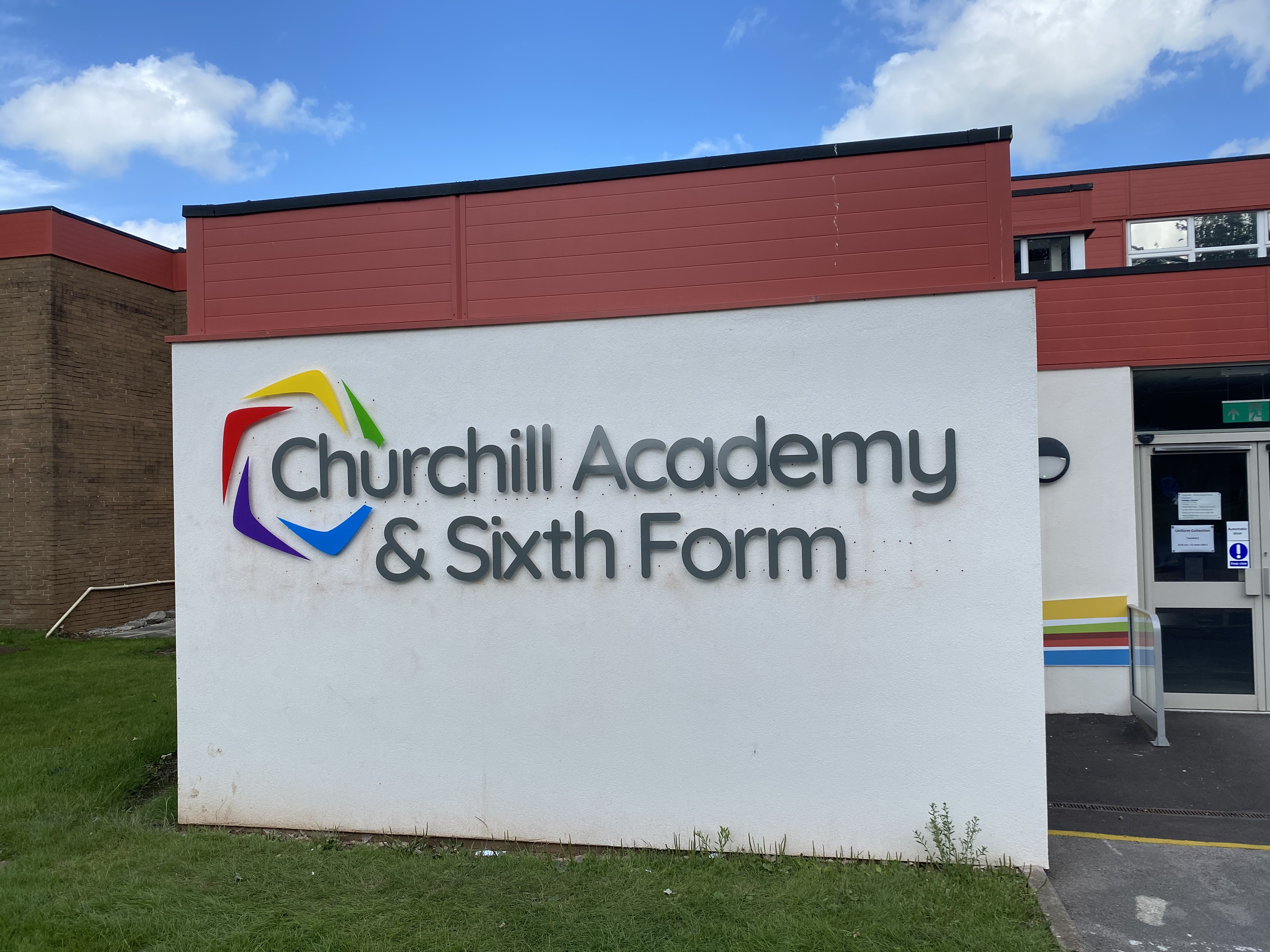
Churchill Academy & Sixth Form

Churchill Academy and Sixth Form, previously known as Churchill Community Foundation School and Sixth Form Centre, is an academy famously situated in the South West of England, in the village of Churchill, North Somerset, England, surrounded by countryside and overlooked by the Mendip Hills. It educates students from ages 11 to 18 and offers General Certificate of Secondary Education, A-levels and BTEC courses. In 2002, the school was granted specialist Arts College status. In August 2011, the school became an academy.

The current headteacher is Chris Hildrew, who has held this position since the beginning of 2016 (He is the ninth headteacher); The Previous Head, Dr Barry Wratten retired in 2015 after being at the helm of the school for 13 years (since 2002). The First head was Reginald J Dennis. Another head was Desmond Foster, The Longest Serving from 1964-1983 and Other Heads include Mr. Gallie (c.1983) and Mr Brian Kirkup (head by 1992 (probably earlier), retired in 2001, succeeded by Dr Wratten). The school was rated 'Outstanding' in its 2015 Ofsted Report. but has Since been lowered to ‘requires improvement’ then back up to ‘Good’.

The school, which had 1,537 years 7-11 students as of 2025 + 287 in the sixth form, is organised by house system, with the houses named after royal houses of England/Britain: Stuart (green), Hanover (gold), Tudor (red) and Windsor (blue). A fifth house, Lancaster (purple), was introduced in 2020.

Churchill celebrated its diamond jubilee in 2017. A new Computing and Business Studies block, named the Alan Turing Building, was built and completed in 2017. Funding was also received in 2017 to build a new Science and Technology block to replace the original 1956 building known as "Tudor Block." The new building was named the Dame Athene Donald Building following a student competition.

== History of the school ==
The school took its first intake of students in January 1957, before its official opening as Churchill Secondary Modern School on Friday, 20 September 1957. In 1969, the school became a comprehensive. In 1996, it became Churchill Community School, before adopting foundation status in 2007 as Churchill Community Foundation School and Sixth Form Centre. The school became an academy on 1 August 2011 as Churchill Academy & Sixth Form. As of 1 April 2023 Churchill Academy & Sixth Form has been part of the Lighthouse Schools Partnership multi-academy trust.

== Notable alumni ==
- Stefanie Martini – actress
- Ruby Harrold – gymnast

== Other activities ==
Since 1995 the school has been a member of the Gabblers Club, the Bristol-based debating organisation. The school has won its annual competition four times, the most recent being 2015

In 2017 George Rabin and Ed Thurlow, students at Churchill Academy, were named GSK Young Scientists of the Year.

Also, the school has produced an array of successful debating champions who compete each year in a local competition run by Dr. Liam Fox MP. The most recent victory was in 2019.
