= George Perry (priest) =

English churchman and academic

George Gresley Perry (1820–1897) was an English churchman and academic, known as a church historian and Archdeacon of Stow.

== Life ==
Born at Churchill, Somerset, he was the twelfth and youngest child of William Perry, a friend and neighbour of Hannah More. He was educated at Ilminster under the Rev. John Allen, and in 1837 he won a scholarship on the Bath and Wells foundation at Corpus Christi College, Oxford. In 1840 he graduated B.A. with a second class in literae humaniores, and obtained the Wells fellowship at Lincoln College, Oxford with the support of Mark Pattison. He graduated M.A. in 1843, and was ordained by the bishop of Oxford, as deacon in 1844 and priest in 1845.

Perry held for a short time, first, the curacy of Wick on the coast of Somerset, and then that of Combe Florey. In 1847 he returned to Oxford as college tutor at Lincoln, a post he held until 1852. During the last year of his fellowship he supported Pattison in the contest to become Rector of the college.

In 1852 Perry accepted the college living of Waddington, Lincolnshire, where he remained for the rest of his life. In 1861 Bishop Jackson made him a non-residentiary canon and rural dean of Longoboby; from 1867 to 1893 he was a proctor in convocation. In 1894 Bishop King appointed him to the archdeaconry of Stow, which he held until his death.

Perry died on 10 February 1897, and was buried in Waddington churchyard. A tablet to his memory in Waddington church and a window in the chapter house of Lincoln Cathedral were erected by subscription.

== Works ==
Perry's History of the Church of England, (3 vols. 1860–4) included the neglected 18th century. In 1868 he published for the S.P.C.K. short Lives of Henry Hammond and Robert Boyle. His major works were Life of Bishop Grosseteste (1872), Life of St. Hugh of Avalon, Bishop of Lincoln (1879), and History of the Reformation in England, written for the "Epochs of Church History'" series edited by Mandell Creighton. The Grosseteste biography has been called a popular and Protestant view.

Among Perry's other works were:

- The Bishop's Daughter, 1860;
- Vox Ecclesiae Anglicanae, 1868, extracts from English theologians;
- History of the Crusades, no date;
- Victor, a Story of the Diocletian Persecution, no date;
- Croyland Abbey, no date.
- The Student's English Church History, (3 vols. the Second Period (1509-1717) appearing in 1878, the First Period (596-1509) in 1881, and the Third Period (1717-1884) in 1887.

Perry also wrote for periodicals and the Dictionary of National Biography. He left two posthumous works. One was the Diocesan History of Lincoln (1897), for the S.P.C.K, which he took up after the death of Edmund Venables. The other was the Lives of the Bishops of Lincoln from Remigius to Wordsworth, with John Henry Overton.

== Family ==
In October 1852 Parry married Eliza Salmon, sister of George Salmon; she died in 1877. They had three sons and four daughters.
