= John Churchill (judge) =

English judge (c. 1620–1685)

Sir John Churchill (c. 1620–1685), Master of the Rolls, was a 17th-century English lawyer and attorney-general. He was the son of Jasper Churchill of London, and grandson of Jasper Churchill of Bradford, Somerset, the great-grandfather of John Churchill, 1st Duke of Marlborough.

He should not be confused with his uncle John Churchill.

== Biography ==
He was admitted a student of Lincoln's Inn on 15 March 1639, and, having been called to the bar in 1647, practised in the Court of Chancery, where he acquired an extensive business. Roger North relates that he 'heard Sir John Churchill, a famous chancery practiser, say, that in his walk from Lincoln's Inn down to the Temple Hall, where (in the Lord Keeper Bridgman's time) causes and motions (out of term) were heard, he had taken with breviates, only for motions and defences for hastening and retarding hearings'. It is to the credit of the Lord Keeper Guilford that he afterwards lopped off this 'limb of the motion practice.' Churchill was knighted on 16 August 1670, and appointed autumn reader at Lincoln's Inn in the same year.

About 1674 he was created a king's counsel and made attorney-general to the Duke of York. In May 1675 he was appointed by the House of Lords senior counsel for Sir Nicholas Crispe on his appeal from a chancery decree in favour of Thomas Dalmahoy, a member of the House of Commons. This was considered a breach of privilege by the commons, being in contravention of the resolution which it had recently passed, to the effect that ‘whosoever shall appear at the bar of the House of Lords, to prosecute any suit against any member of this house, shall be deemed a breaker and infringer of the rights and privileges of this house.’ On 1 June 1675 Churchill and the three other counsel who had appeared on behalf of Crispe were, by the order of the House of Commons, taken into custody by the serjeant-at-arms. After they had been released by the order of the House of Lords, it was resolved by the House of Commons on the 4th, by 152 to 147, that Sir John Churchill ‘should be sent to the Tower for his breach of privilege and contempt of the authority of this house,’ whereupon he was seized by the serjeant-at-arms while within the bar of the court of chancery, and committed to the Tower. The quarrel between the two houses was at length put an end to by the prorogation of parliament by the king on 9 June, when Churchill was immediately released. In 1683 he was chosen Recorder of Bristol, in the room of Sir Thomas Atkins, and on 12 Jan. 1685 he succeeded Sir Harbottle Grimston as Master of the Rolls. In March 1685 he was elected member for Bristol, and he died during the succeeding summer vacation. He was buried on 11 October 1685 at Churchill, Somerset.

== Personal life ==
He married Susan, daughter of Edmund Prideaux, by whom he left four daughters. The manor of Churchill in Somerset, which he purchased from Richard Jennyns, was sold soon after his death for the payment of his debts.
