= Mike Adams (footballer) =

English footballer

Personal information
- Full name: Michael Alan Adams
- Date of birth: 20 February 1965 (age 61)
- Place of birth: Banwell, England
- Position: Midfielder

Youth career
- 19??–1981: Banwell
- 1981–1983: Bristol Rovers

Senior career*
Years	Team	Apps	(Gls)
1983–1984	Bristol Rovers	1	(0)
1984	→ Bath City (loan)		
1984–1988	Bath City	112	(?)
1988–1993	Weston-super-Mare		
1993–????	Keynsham Town		
- * Club domestic league appearances and goals

Michael Alan Adams (born 20 February 1965) is an English former professional footballer.

Adams began his career as an apprentice with Bristol Rovers. He played just once for their first team before leaving to join Bath City, initially on loan, in March 1984. His only appearance for The Pirates came in the final game of the 1982–83 season; a match that was a memorable one for several reasons. Rovers' previous manager, Bobby Gould, had resigned the day before, their opponents, Cardiff City, won promotion thanks to the point they earned in this 1–1 draw, it was the final professional game for former England international and FIFA World Cup winner Alan Ball, and Rovers player Aidan McCaffery required life-saving treatment from the physio after swallowing his tongue. All of these events combined left Adams's 27-minute cameo at the end of the game somewhat unnoticed.

He signed a permanent contract with Bath late in May 1984 and was a regular with them for four years, scoring 22 times in 175 first team games, until being released in May 1988 by new City manager Harold Jarman. He then spent five years with Weston-super-Mare, before joining Keynsham Town in 1993.
