= Banwell Caves =

Caves in Somerset, England

- Site of Special Scientific Interest
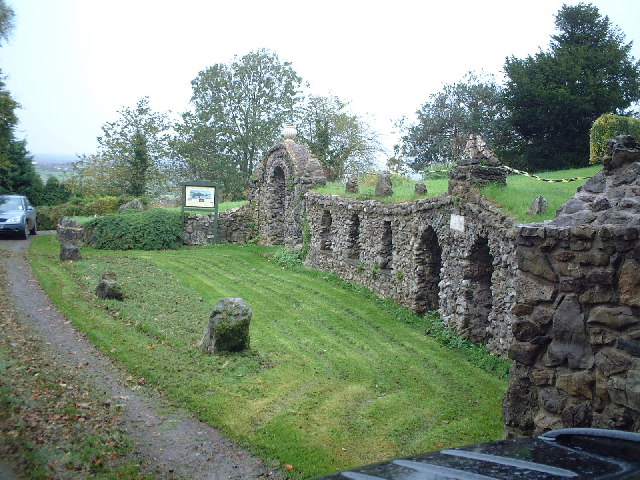
- The Druid's Temple and entrance archway to the Bone Cave

- Location within Somerset
- Location of Banwell Caves.
- Area of search: Avon
- Grid reference: ST383588
- Coordinates: 51.3249°N 2.8869°W
- Interest: Biological/Geological
- Area: 1.7 ha (4.2 acres)
- Notification date: 1963

Banwell Bone Cave
- Interactive map of Banwell Bone Cave
- Location: Banwell
- Depth: 25 m (82 ft)
- Length: 92 m (302 ft)
- Geology: Limestone
- Cave survey: Mendip Cave Registry & Archive: (1) and (2)

Banwell Stalactite Cave
- Interactive map of Banwell Stalactite Cave
- Location: Banwell
- Depth: 62 m (203 ft)
- Length: 271 m (889 ft)
- Geology: Limestone
- Cave survey: Mendip Cave Registry & Archive: (1) and (2)

Banwell Caves (grid reference ST383588) are a 1.7-hectare geological and biological Site of Special Scientific Interest near the village of Banwell, North Somerset, England notified in 1963.

The site comprises two caves, called 'Banwell Bone Cave' and 'Banwell Stalactite Cave', which lie within the grounds of a large house, at the western end of Banwell Hill. The caves contain barite deposits, which are found in greater abundance and variety here than at any other site in the Mendip Hills, and are used as a hibernation site by greater horseshoe bats (Rhinolophus ferrumequinum).

The site also has several grottos and follies, including the Pebble summerhouse, Druid's Temple, an osteoicon (or bone repository) and Banwell Tower which was completed in 1840.

== History ==
The first cave to be discovered was the Stalactite Cave in 1757. This was opened in 1824 as a show cave to raise money for the local school. In an attempt to make access easier, a tunnel was dug into the hill during which the bone cave was discovered in 1825.

The estate was owned by George Henry Law as Bishop of Bath and Wells, who thought the bones which were found were those of animals drowned in the flood at the time of Noah's Ark described in the Book of Genesis. The bishop had paths and folly buildings created for visitors and built a small cottage, which later became his retirement home.

Since the 1970s, preservation and restoration work has been undertaken.

== Bone Cave ==
Banwell Bone Cave is 100 m (328 ft) long and 20 m (66 ft) deep. The Bone Cavern itself is 8 m (26 ft) high and wide and 20 m long. It is approached through an early 19th-century archway. It contains an assemblage of bones of mammals (including bear, deer, ox, bison and reindeer) from the Pleistocene era (approximately 80,000 years ago). The cave has a large hole in the roof and is believed to have been used as a pitfall trap.

The Bone Cave was discovered in 1824 during attempts to drive a horizontal passage into the Stalactite Cave. Archaeological excavation was carried out by William Beard, with some of the bones being removed, but many being left in the cave in stacks.

== Stalactite Cave ==
Banwell Stalactite Cave is 240 m (787 ft) long and 75 m (246 ft) deep. Although no stream now runs through the cave, there is a deep lake in one of the chambers. The Stalactite Cave was entered by miners in 1757, and was a show cave between about 1824 and 1864.

== Banwell Tower ==
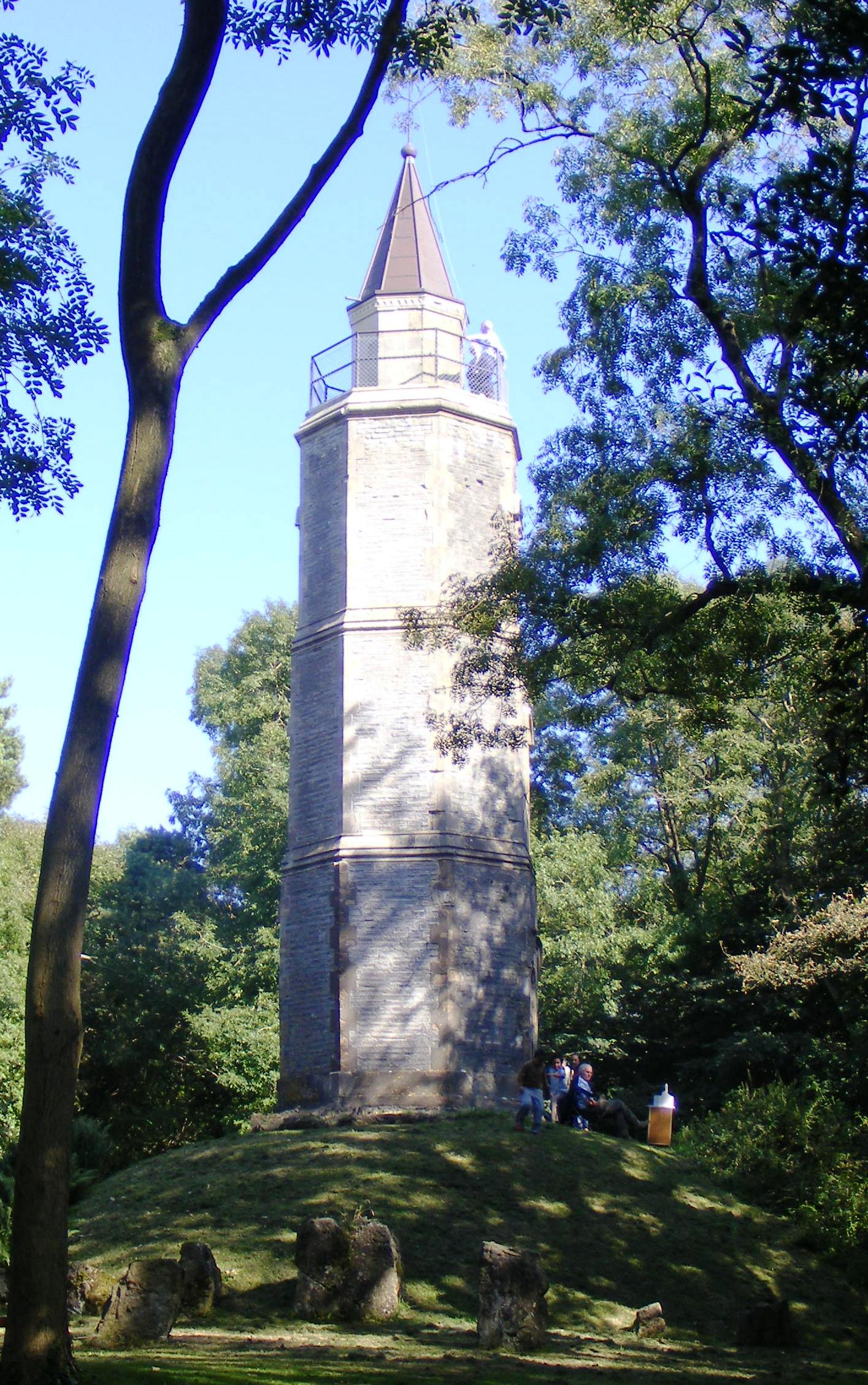
Banwell Tower

The 18-metre (59 ft) high, three-stage tower, which is also known as the Banwell Monument or Banwell Pepperpot, was built in 1840 from local lias stone with some decoration in Bath stone. During World War II, it was used as a lookout tower by the Home Guard. By the 1960s it was in a poor state of repair and could no longer be seen above the growing treetops. Local conservation groups undertook conservation work, and it was reopened to the public in 1996. It is a Grade II listed building.

== See also ==
- Banwell Ochre Caves
- Caves of the Mendip Hills
