= St Andrew's Church, Banwell =

Church in Somerset, England

Church of St Andrew
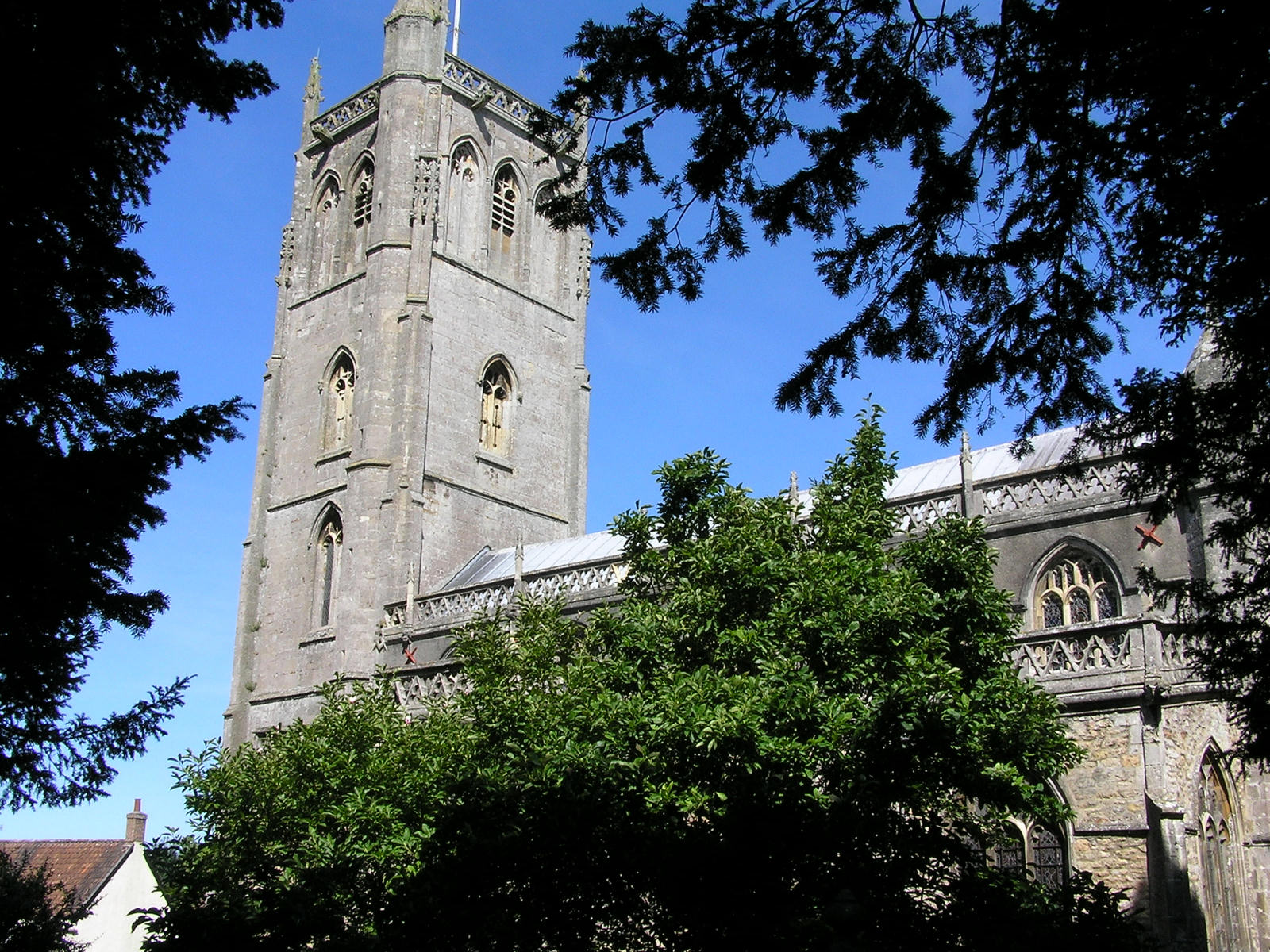

- Location within Somerset

General information
- Location: Banwell, England
- Coordinates: 51.3279°N 2.8633°W
- Completed: 15th century

The mainly 15th-century parish Church of St Andrew in Banwell, Somerset, England, is a Grade I listed building.

The body of the church has a nave with a clerestory, north and south aisles and a rather short chancel, considering the proportions of the rest of the church. The font dates from the 12th century and there is a carved stone pulpit from the 15th century and a carved rood screen built and set up in 1552, which escaped the Reformation.

The 100 ft (30 m) high tower, which dates from around 1417, contains ten bells dates from the 18th to 20th century and the clock is dated 1884. Bells dating from 1734 and 1742 were made by Thomas Bilbie, of the Bilbie family. On the western face of the tower is a representation of the Annunciation. In the Virgin Mary's niche there is a lily pot as a symbol of purity, and a lily leaf motif is also to be found in the font and pulpit.

The churchyard contains the war grave of a Hampshire Regiment soldier of World War I.

== See also ==
- List of Grade I listed buildings in North Somerset
- List of towers in Somerset
- List of ecclesiastical parishes in the Diocese of Bath and Wells
