= Banwell =

Village in Somerset, England

Coordinates: 51.327°N 2.864°W

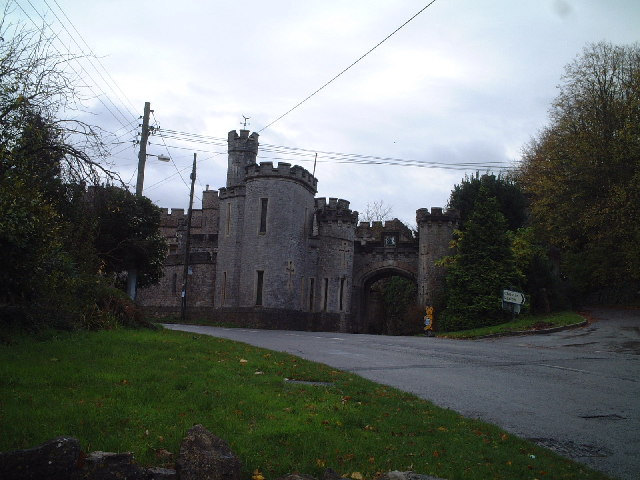
- Banwell Castle

- Location within Somerset
- Population: 3,251
- OS grid reference: ST398591
- Unitary authority: North Somerset
- Ceremonial county: Somerset
- Region: South West
- Country: England
- Sovereign state: United Kingdom
- Post town: BANWELL
- Postcode district: BS29
- Dialling code: 01934
- Police: Avon and Somerset
- Fire: Avon
- Ambulance: South Western
- UK Parliament: Wells and Mendip Hills

Banwell is a village and civil parish on the River Banwell in the North Somerset district of Somerset, England. Its population was 3,251 according to the 2021 census.

== Toponymy ==
Banwell's name is first securely attested around the year 900 in forms including Banuwille and Bananwylle; it appears in the Domesday Book of 1086 in the form Banwelle. This name was taken by Margaret Gelling and Victor Watts as an Old English compound of bana 'slayer' (in its genitive singular form banan) and wielle 'well, fountain, spring', thus meaning something like 'murderer's stream'.

However, Harry Jelley suggested in the 1990s that Banwell was the home of St Patrick's father, who according to Patrick’s autobiographical Confessio 'fuit vico Bannavem Taburniae, villulam enim prope habuit, ubi ego capturam dedi' ('lived at Bannavem Taburniae, because he had a small estate nearby, where I was taken prisoner'). Jelley argued that Bannavem Taburniae is a scribal corruption of *Bannaventa Tabernae, a partly Celtic and partly Latin place-name meaning 'market-place by a hill and with an inn'. In the view of Andrew Breeze, 'despite much that is wrong-headed, his arguments are here compelling', and Breeze accepted the identification. If so, then the Old English name in fact took the first syllable of the Roman-period name, adding wielle as an Old English generic element.

== History ==
Banwell Camp, east of the village, is a univallate hillfort which has yielded flint implements from the Palaeolithic, Neolithic and Bronze Age. It was also occupied in the Iron Age. In the late 1950s it was excavated by J. W. Hunt of the Banwell Society of Archaeology. It is surrounded by a 4 metres (13 ft) high bank and ditch.

The remains of a Romano-British villa were discovered in 1968. It included a courtyard, wall and bath house close to the River Banwell. Artefacts from the site suggest it fell into disuse in the 4th century. Earthworks from farm buildings, 420 metres (1,380 ft) south of Gout House Farm, occupied from the 11th to 14th centuries where archaeological remains suggest the site was first occupied in the Romano-British period. The raised area which was occupied by the Bower House was surrounded by a water-filled ditch, part of which has since been incorporated into a rhyne (a drainage ditch).

The parish was part of the Winterstoke Hundred.

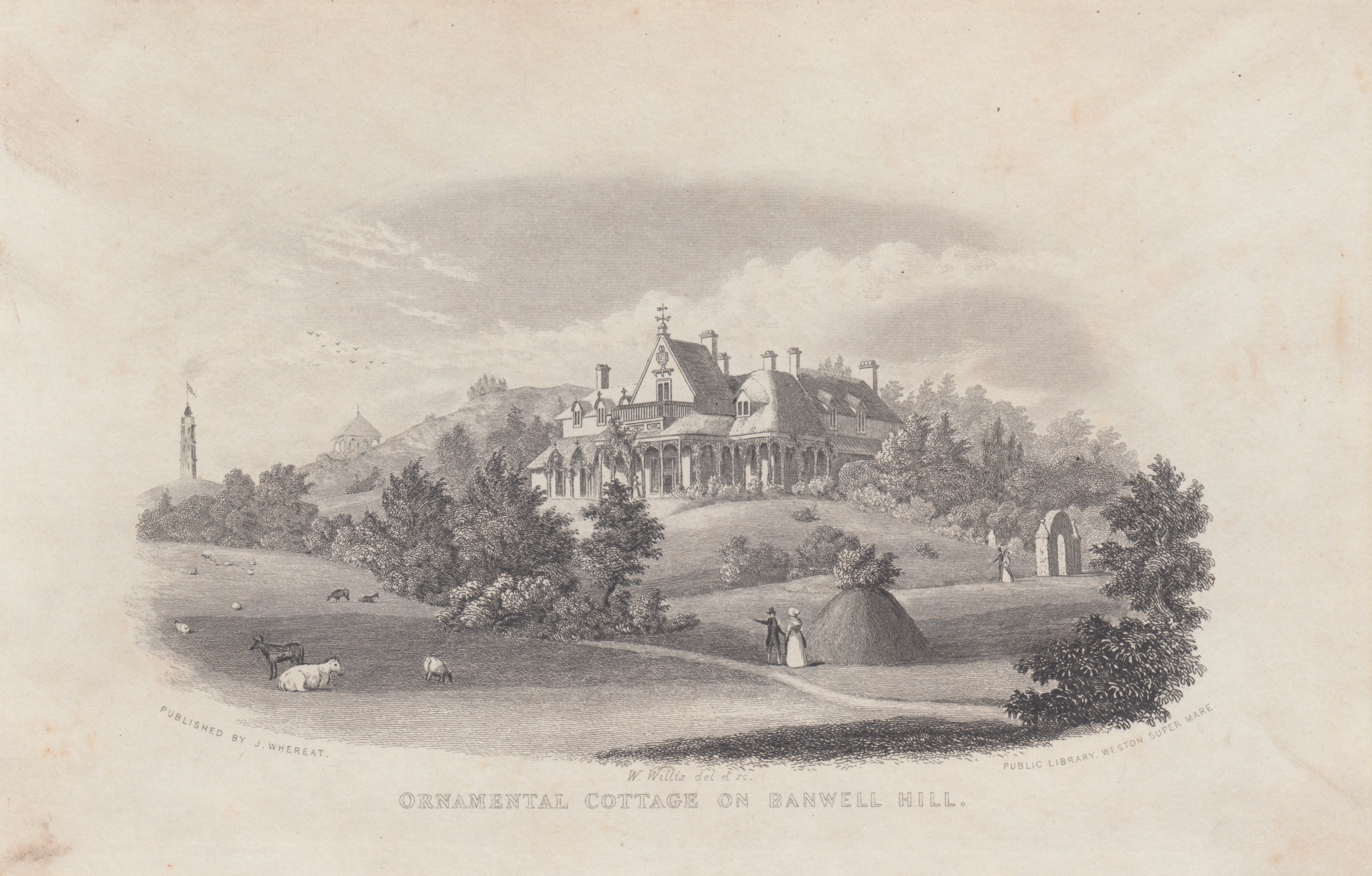
Bishop's Cottage, Banwell Hill, c.1840

Banwell Abbey was built as a bishop’s residence in the 14th and 15th century on the site of a monastic foundation. It was renovated in 1870 by Hans Price, and is now a Grade II* listed building. Nearby is a small building presented to the village by Miss Elizabeth Fazakerly, who lived at The Abbey in 1887, to house a small fire-engine. It served as the fire station until the 1960s and now houses a small museum of memorabilia related to the fire station.

"Beard's Stone" in Cave's Wood dates from 1842. It marks the reburial site of an ancient human skeleton found in a cave near Bishop's Cottage. William Beard, an amateur archaeologist who had found the bones, had them reinterred and marked the site with the stone with a poetic inscription.

Banwell Castle is a Victorian castle built in 1847 by John Dyer Sympson, a solicitor from London. Originally built as his home, it is now a hotel and restaurant and is a Grade II* listed building.

Of the two historical village pumps standing in the village, one of them was erected to commemorate Queen Victoria's Diamond Jubilee.

== Governance ==
The parish council has responsibility for local issues, including setting an annual precept (local rate) to cover the council's operating costs and producing annual accounts for public scrutiny. The parish council evaluates local planning applications and works with the local police, district council officers, and neighbourhood watch groups on matters of crime, security, and traffic. The parish council's role also includes initiating projects for the maintenance and repair of parish facilities, such as the village hall or community centre, playing fields and playgrounds, as well as consulting with the district council on the maintenance, repair, and improvement of highways, drainage, footpaths, public transport, and street cleaning. Conservation matters (including trees and listed buildings) and environmental issues are also of interest to the council.

The parish falls within the unitary authority of North Somerset which was created in 1996, as established by the Local Government Act 1992. It provides a single tier of local government with responsibility for almost all local government functions within its area including local planning and building control, local roads, council housing, environmental health, markets and fairs, refuse collection, recycling, cemeteries, crematoria, leisure services, parks, and tourism. It is also responsible for education, social services, libraries, main roads, public transport, trading standards, waste disposal and strategic planning, although fire, police and ambulance services are provided jointly with other authorities through the Avon Fire and Rescue Service, Avon and Somerset Constabulary and the South Western Ambulance Service.

North Somerset's area covers part of the ceremonial county of Somerset but it is administered independently of the non-metropolitan county. Its administrative headquarters is in the town hall in Weston-super-Mare. Between 1 April 1974 and 1 April 1996, it was the Woodspring district of the county of Avon. Before 1974 the parish was part of the Axbridge Rural District.

The village falls in the 'Banwell and Winscombe' electoral ward. This ward starts at its most northerly point in St. Georges visits Banwell and Winscombe before ending at Loxton at its most southerly point. The total population of the ward taken from the 2011 census was 11,036.

The parish is represented in the House of Commons of the Parliament of the United Kingdom as part of the Wells and Mendip Hills constituency. It elects one Member of Parliament (MP) by the first past the post system of election. It was also part of the South West England constituency of the European Parliament, prior to Britain leaving the European Union in January 2020, which elected seven MEPs using the d'Hondt method of party-list proportional representation.

== Geography ==
Banwell is located 5 miles (8.0 km) east of Weston-super-Mare on the A371 road and is where the western end of the A368 road begins. The village is at the west end of the northern side of the Mendip hills.

The village is located between the M5 motorway and the A38, and is used by a significant volume of commuter traffic. This traffic, together with other users of the A371 and A368, often causes the narrow streets of Banwell to become jammed. There has been a campaign to bypass Banwell for many years, but other villages in the area have objected as increasing the traffic capacity on the roads would create problem on their roads. The Greater Bristol Strategic Transport Study in 2006 recommended that a road be built from Junction 21 of the M5 directly to Bristol Airport, bypassing Banwell and all the other local villages, thus alleviating their concerns. However, this would not benefit local traffic passing through Banwell to and from Weston-super-Mare, Wells and Bath, so some traffic problems would still exist.

Banwell Caves is a 1.7 hectares (4.2 acres) geological and biological Site of Special Scientific Interest at the western end of Banwell Hill.

=== Climate ===
Along with the rest of South West England, Banwell has a temperate climate which is generally wetter and milder than the rest of the country. The annual mean temperature is approximately 10 °C (50.0 °F). Seasonal temperature variation is less extreme than most of the United Kingdom because of the adjacent sea temperatures. The summer months of July and August are the warmest with mean daily maxima of approximately 21 °C (69.8 °F). In winter mean minimum temperatures of 1 °C (33.8 °F) or 2 °C (35.6 °F) are common. In the summer the Azores high pressure affects the south-west of England. However, convective cloud sometimes forms inland, reducing the number of hours of sunshine. Annual sunshine rates are slightly less than the regional average of 1,600 hours. In December 1998 there were 20 days without sun recorded at Yeovilton. Most of the rainfall in the south-west is caused by Atlantic depressions or by convection. Most of the rainfall in autumn and winter is caused by the Atlantic depressions, which is when they are most active. In summer, a large proportion of the rainfall is caused by sun heating the ground leading to convection and to showers and thunderstorms. Average rainfall is around 700 mm (28 in). About 8–15 days of snowfall is typical. November to March have the highest mean wind speeds, and June to August have the lightest winds. The predominant wind direction is from the south-west.

== Religious sites ==
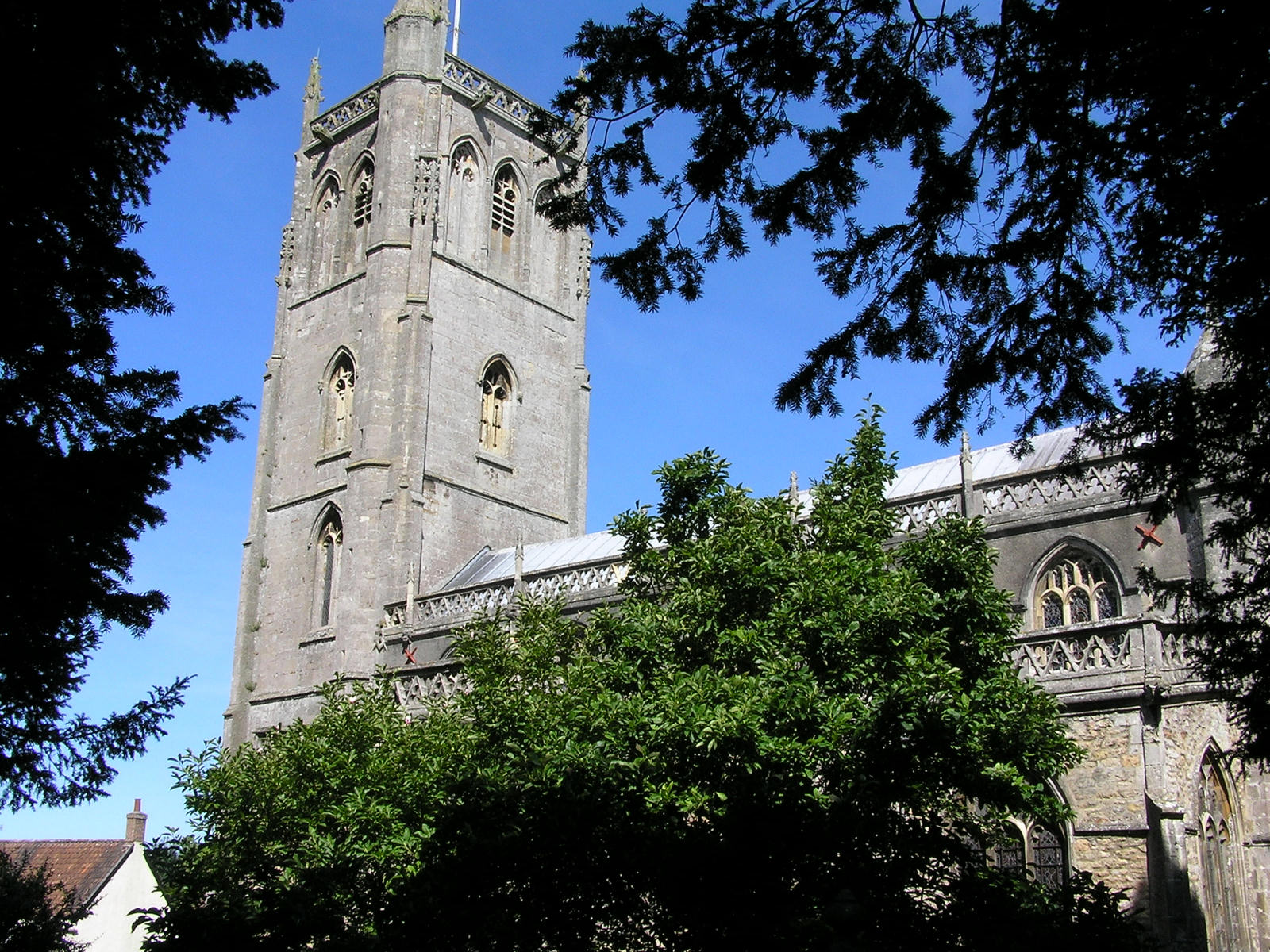
St Andrew's Church

The mainly 15th-century parish church of St Andrew is a Grade I listed building. The body of the church has a nave with a clerestory, north and south aisles and a rather short chancel, considering the proportions of the rest of the church. The font dates from the 12th century and there is a carved stone pulpit from the 15th century and a carved rood screen built and set up in 1552, which escaped the Reformation. The 100 ft (30 m) high tower that contains ten bells dates from the 18th to 20th century, and the clock is dated 1884. Bells dating from 1734 and 1742 were made by Thomas Bilbie, of the Bilbie family.

== Economy ==
Bristol Aerojet, was a joint UK-US rocket factory, built from 1959, with a company from Azusa, California.

== Transport ==
A bypass, expected to cost £57 million, is planned. Construction work was due to start in spring 2024 but was delayed as the main contractor withdrew from the project. In September 2024, Galliford Try was appointed as the new main contractor and the start date was revised to the end of 2024.

== Notable people ==
- William Beard (1772–1868), a British bone collector.
- Claude Hermann Walter Johns (1857–1920), an Assyriologist and Church of England clergyman.
- William Job Maillard (1863–1903), a British surgeon, Royal Navy officer, and recipient of the Victoria Cross (VC)
- Brigadier John Alan Lyde Caunter, (1889–1981), a senior British Army officer and a pioneer shark angler (Big-game fishing)
- Mike Adams (born 1965), former footballer, played 112 games for Bath City

== Twin town ==
Banwell has been twinned with Potigny in France since 1993.
