= Churchill Methodist Church =

Methodist Church in North Somerset, England

- Wesleyan Methodist Memorial Church
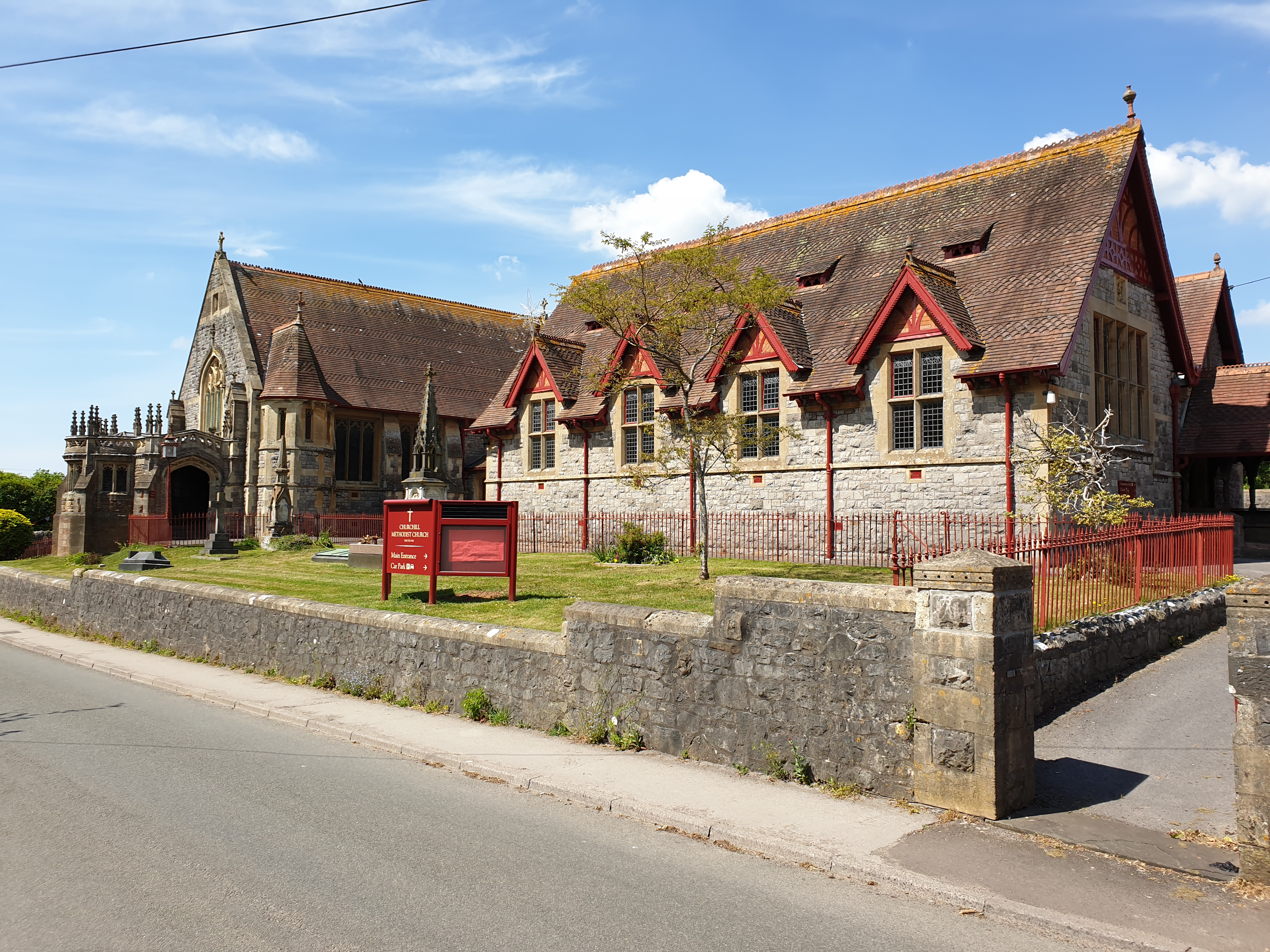
- Methodist church in Front Street, Churchill

- Location within Somerset
- 51.334339°N 2.800290°W
- OS grid reference: ST 44352 59773
- Location: Churchill, North Somerset
- Country: England
- Denomination: Methodist
- Website: Churchill Methodist Church

History
- Founder: Sidney Hill
- Dedicated: 1 June 1879 (Whitsun): Schoolroom; 2 May 1881: Church

Architecture
- Functional status: Active
- Architect: Foster and Wood of Bristol
- Architectural type: Methodist church
- Style: Perpendicular Gothic

Listed Building – Grade II
- Official name: Methodist church, school room, coach house and attached walls
- Designated: 19 January 1987 (39 years ago)
- Reference no.: 1157925

Churchill Methodist Church, in the village of Churchill, North Somerset, is a Grade II listed Methodist church on the Somerset Mendip Methodist Circuit. Designed by Foster & Wood, Bristol, of Perpendicular Gothic style, the church opened on 2 May 1881. The schoolroom and coach house, of Elizabethan architecture, were erected before the new church, and opened on 1 June 1879 (Whitsun). Sidney Hill, a wealthy local businessman and benefactor, erected the church and schoolroom as a memorial to his wife.

The Reverend Meg Slingo is the incumbent minister for Churchill. The Anglican and Methodist churches work together in many areas, particularly activities that involve children and initiatives in the parish schools. The schoolroom is now used as a hall and is run by a charity. The hall has a newly refitted kitchen and smaller rooms making it useful for community activities.

== History ==
Methodists in Churchill would meet at a private home (society meetings), until the autumn of 1835, when the first chapel was opened. (Note: Note, some sources state that the original chapel was opened in 1830 by Richard Treffry, senior. Richard Treffry was president of the Wesleyan Conference in 1833.) William Baker was a trustee of the chapel by the time the Churchill tithe map had been constructed in 1843. This chapel was demolished in 1880 so that Sidney Hill could erect a new Wesleyan church on adjacent land gifted by William Bobbett. (Note: William Bobbett was a close friend, the leader in society meetings at Old Market Street chapel, Bristol, and the uncle of Hill's wife, Mary Ann Bobbett. Hill would later dedicate Shipham Methodist Chapel to the memory of William Bobbett.) Sidney Hill had married his wife, Mary Ann Bobbett, at the old chapel on 15 June 1864, and erected the new church as a memorial to her after her early death on 7 December 1874 (aged 35). (Note: The cemetery to the west of the church is where the old chapel used to stand.) The new church was designed by Foster and Wood of Bristol in Perpendicular Gothic style, and erected by William Veals, master builder of Bristol, at a cost of £3,300 (equivalent to £343,000 in 2025). Hill would engage the same firm of architects in 1897 to design the nearby clock tower. (Note: Foster and Wood were a busy architectural practice in Victorian Bristol and many landmark Bristol buildings were designed by them, including Fosters Almshouse (1861), Colston Hall (1864), the Grand Hotel on Broad Street (1864 to 1869), Bristol Grammar School (1875), as well as a large number of Wesleyan chapels throughout the city.) The church opened on 2 May 1881 (145 years ago) with a dedication and sacramental service commencing at 2:00 pm.

The schoolroom and coach house, of Elizabethan architecture, were erected before the new church, and opened on Whitsun, 1 June 1879 (147 years ago). These buildings cost £1,300 (equivalent to £140,000 in 2025) to build and the schoolroom was later linked to the new church by a cloister. Hill also vested in trustees money to provide an income for the maintenance of the chapel and schoolroom. (Note: The trustees of the Churchill Memorial Chapel and School Trust.) In 1898, Sidney Hill funded the addition of a porch that was designed by Foster and Wood and built by Henry Rose of Churchill.

In 1906, Sidney Hill gifted land at the back of the church for a burial ground extension. The ground was consecrated in June of that year. (Note: The Sunday school had been running since 1877 when Sidney Hill moved to the area after purchasing Langford House.) The church closed in August 1924 so that the organ could be refurbished and four stops added. The opportunity was also taken to provide better accommodation for the choir. Services were held in the schoolroom until the church was reopened on 27 November 1924 with a service held in the afternoon. On 1 September 1933, the Methodist circuits of Draycott, Cheddar, Congresbury and Palmer's Green, were united to form one circuit, under the name of the Cheddar Valley Methodist Circuit.

== Design and features ==
=== Church ===
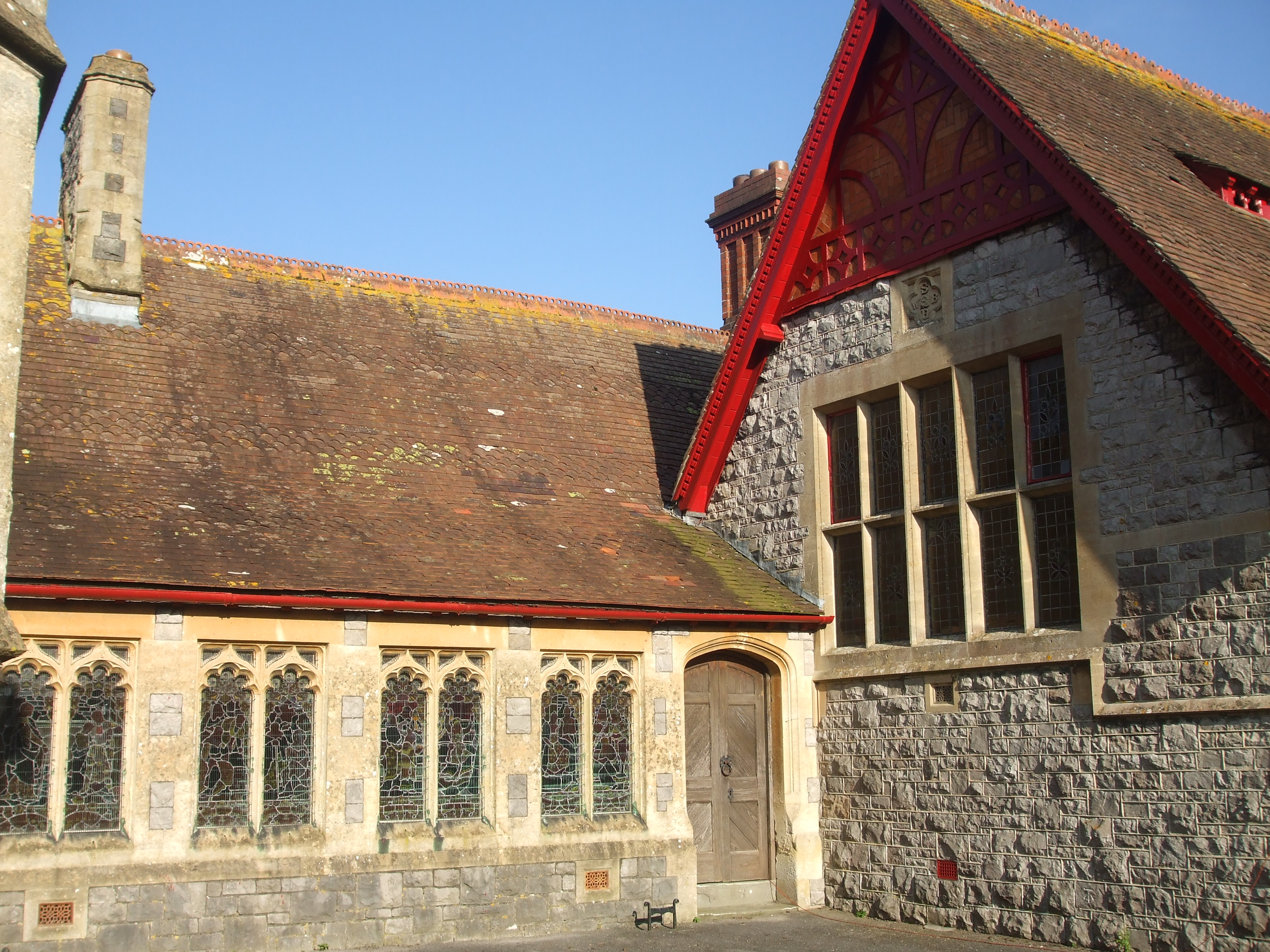
Porch linking the church with the schoolroom

The church consists of a chancel, nave chancel, and two transepts, with a gallery at one end facing the pulpit. (Note: The transept pews were removed in 2004.) There is a staircase turret with pyramidal cap to the north east for access to the gallery. An organ is installed in the eastern transept. It cased with freestone, and has an arched pitch pine ceiling, divided into panels by moulded ribs, bearing on attached stone shafts. At the extreme end of the chancel, immediately above the communion table, there is memorial window by Clayton and Bell, representing Dorcas amidst the people that she helped, in her illness, in her death, and resurrection. Immediately beneath the memorial window, and extending the whole length of communion platform, there is brass plate with the following inscription:

This building was erected in the year of our Lord 1880, by Sidney Hill, Esq., of Langford-house, to the glory of God, and in memory of the life and labours (in this parish, and at Port Elizabeth, South Africa), of his beloved wife, Mary Ann, who was born in Bristol, March 6th, 1839, and died at Bournemouth, Dec. 7th, 1874.

In April 1894, Sidney Hill gifted four stained glass windows to the church. The windows were made by Joseph Bell and Sons, of College Green, Bristol, and represent: (Note: See also Arnold Wathen Robinson.)

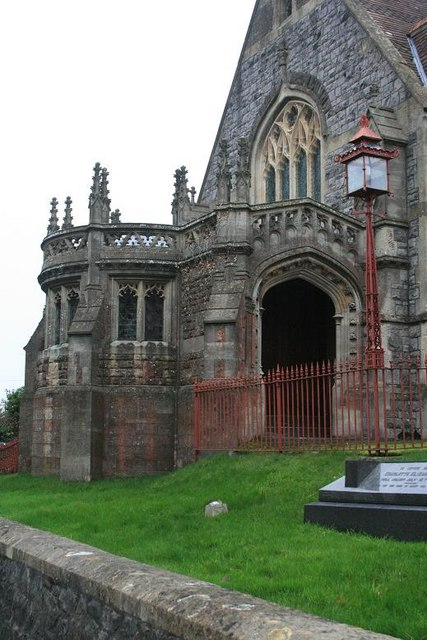
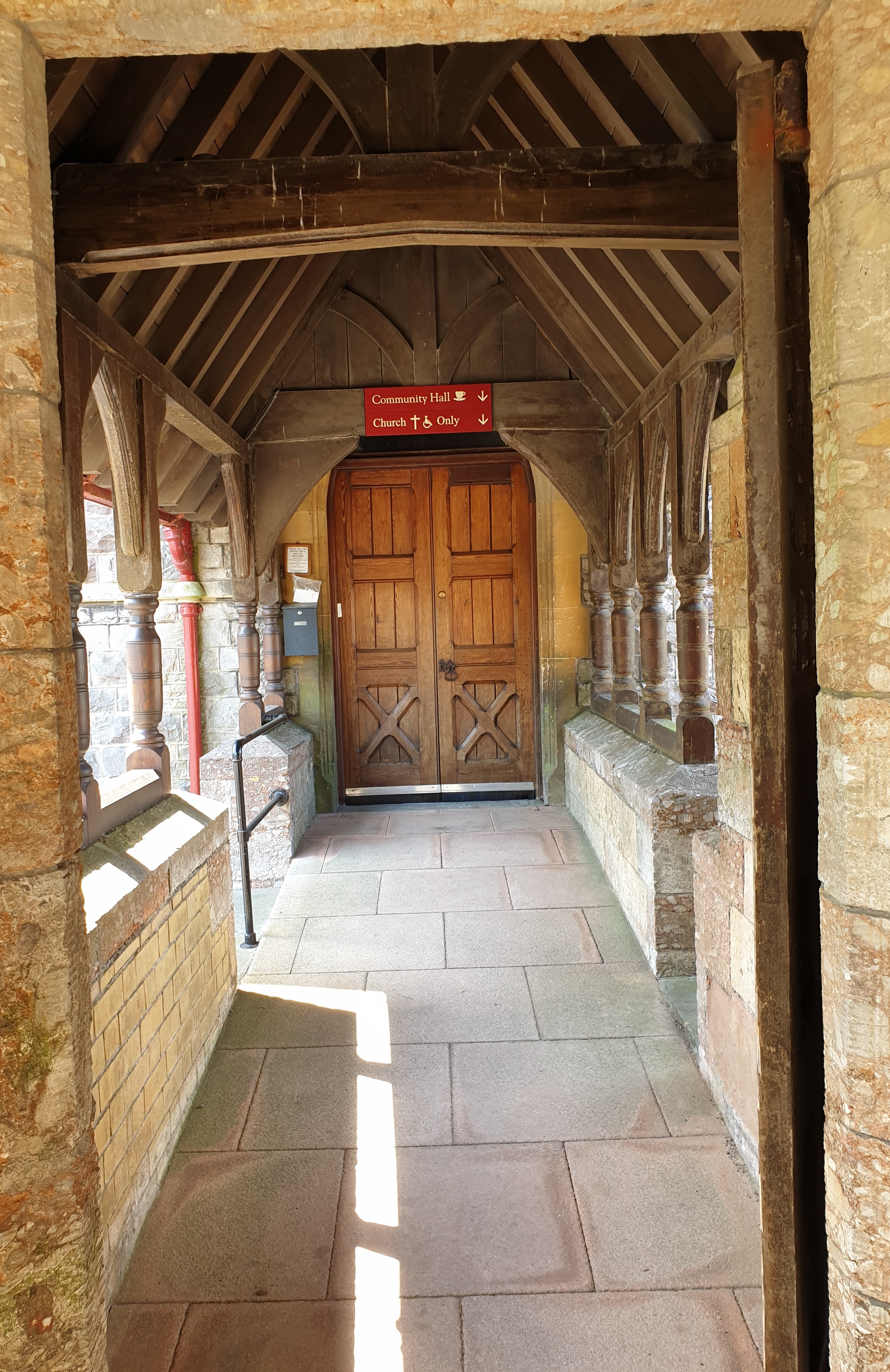
The Narthex at the front of the church and the cloister from the porte-cochère to the schoolroom
- The presentation of our Lord in the temple
- Christ healing the sick
- His last charge to His Apostles
- Lord blessing little children

The first three subjects are installed in windows on one side of the building, and Lord blessing little children is installed in the transept. Each subject is arranged to occupy three panels formed by canopy work and casements. (Note: For a history of stained glass windows in England, see The Development of Stained Glass in England. A Brief History of Stylistic Development in English Stained Glass.) Lord blessing little children follows the same arrangement but angels are displayed in the stone work of the tracery. Each of the windows has a scriptural text at the foot of the lights.

=== Porch ===
The porch was built in Perpendicular Gothic style, with Rowberrow stone and Doulting freestone dressings. The side doors are made of teak, the roof of pitch pine, with encaustic floor tiles. The stained glass windows were made by James Bell and Son, College Green, Bristol, and represent: (Note: Joseph Bell, the maker of the original stained glass windows in the church, had died on 28 August 1895.)

- The Four Evangelists
- The Minor Prophets

On each sole of the church entrance is a pedestal brought from Bethlehem and Jerusalem, the gift of William Sidney Adams, of South Africa, that held lamps when the porch was first opened. (Note: William Sidney Adams married Fanny Ellen Bobbett, the younger sister of Sidney Hill's wife, Mary Ann, at the Methodist church in Churchill on 6 December 1898. Fanny Ellen is interred in the cemetery at the front of the church, in the same grave as her uncle, William Bobbett, and next to the grave of Sidney and Mary Ann Hill.) A large number of Wesleyans from all parts of the Circuit attended the opening ceremony on 26 October 1898.

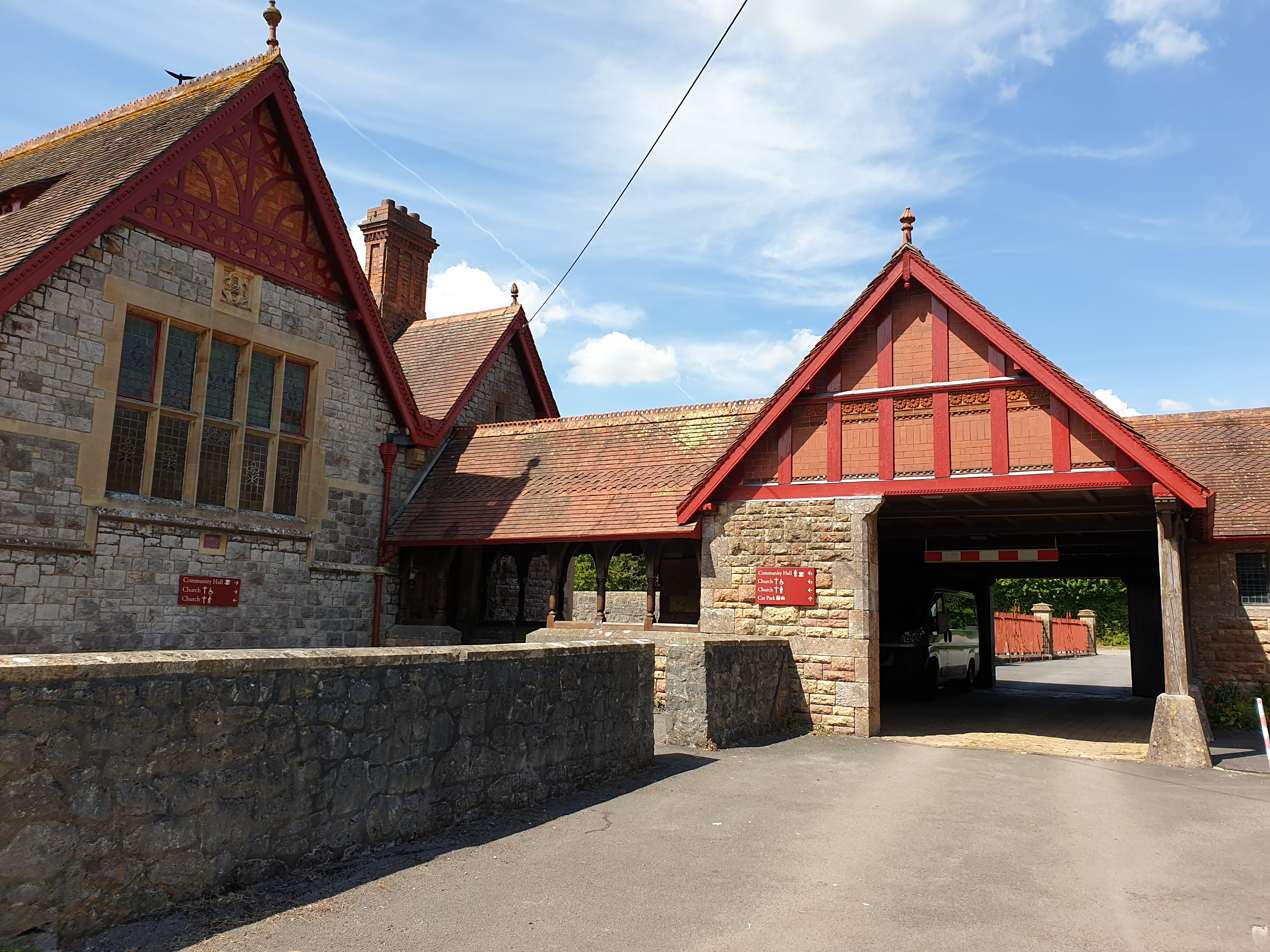
Gable end of schoolroom (dated 1879) and porte-cochère to car park

=== Schoolroom ===
From January 1902, further stained glass windows were installed in the schoolroom. The first window to be installed was Suffer little children to come unto me, displayed in three windows, and with the text displayed at the foot of the middle window. The windows were funded by Sidney Hill and designed by James Paxton Brown Young of Horfield, Bristol. Young was a former employee of Joseph Bell and Sons, and at that time, was the figure glass painting artist for the stained glass in the chapel. (Note: Young was one of the best known stained glass experts in England, and was responsible for many beautiful windows in Bristol Cathedral and elsewhere.) Young formulated designs for a number of other windows in the school:

- Christ blessing the children and Sermon on the Mount (three leaded lights each)
- Nativity, Adoration of the Magi, Subservient to His parents, (Note: "He returned with them to Nazareth and was obedient to them.") and Christ with the Doctors in the Temple (two leaded lights each)
- Christ entering Jerusalem and Feeding of the Five Thousand (three windows each)
- Woman of Samaria, On the way to Emmaus, Good Shepherd, and Light of the World, are displayed in a single window

== Ministers ==
The Reverend Meg Slingo is the incumbent minister covering Churchill. She was a former minister of Salem Methodist Church, Cheslyn Hay, Staffordshire, before being inducted to the Somerset Mendip Methodist circuit on the 30 August 2019 in a ceremony at Wells Methodist church.

Methodist Circuit Ministers covering Churchill from 1899 onwards
Appointed	Minister	Circuit	Notes	Ref.
1899	Rev. Richard Starling Boulter (1848–1944)	Banwell		
1903	Rev. Henry Jefford (1841–1907)	Banwell		
1905	Rev. John Edward Winter (1845–1915)	Banwell		
1908	Rev. Stephen James Little (1854–1928)	Cheddar and Banwell		
1910	Rev. Robert Hugh Alfred Morton (1867–1947)	Cheddar and Banwell		
1913	Rev. William John May (1882–1959)	Cheddar and Banwell		
1916	Rev. George Arthur Swaine (1876–1949)	Cheddar and Banwell	Formerly of Sheffield.	
1919	Rev. Robert Maxwell Carnson (1889–1973)	Cheddar and Banwell	He was a missionary to China, a serviceman in World War I, and a garrison chaplain during World War II. He was also a fellow of the Royal Geographical Society and a writer. (Note: Amongst his works is the science fiction novel Monkeys of Hai Tu. It is set in a secret Chinese city guarded by fascisti-like guards, and cut-off from the rest of the world, but nevertheless, possessing electric light and escalators.)	
1921	Rev. Charles Povah Bardsley (1887–1969)	Cheddar and Banwell		
1924	Rev. Alfred George Woodnutt (1884–1971)	Cheddar and Banwell		
1927	Rev. Reginald Francis Haslock (1891–1949)	Cheddar and Banwell		
1931	Rev. Donald Streat (1891–1968)	Cheddar and Banwell	South African missionary.	
1934	Rev. Marmaduke Roy Smith (1894–1979)	Cheddar Valley	Smith served for four years in the war winning a Military Cross. His previous circuit was the Devon and Dorset Mission.	
1938	Rev. Albert Harvey (1900–1997)	Cheddar Valley	From Otley, Yorkshire. He left to take up an appointment as the second minister on the Bridlington Quay circuit.	
1944	Rev. Christopher William Jarvis (1909–1978)	Cheddar Valley	He was a minister at Street Methodist Church.	
1949	Rev. Morgan William Slade (1897–1954)	Cheddar Valley	Former minister at Rowe Methodist Church, St Breward.	
1952	Rev. Maurice Whittaker Kirk ({1914–1993)	Cheddar Valley	Moved to Cornwall.	
1957	Rev. Clifford Sutton ({1917–1996)	Cheddar Valley	Former minister at Wolverhampton.	
1964	Rev. Leonard Ralph Edwards (1922–1996)	Cheddar Valley		
1969	Rev. Raymond George Morris (1911–2003)	Cheddar Valley	Former minister on the Bristol circuit.	
1972	Rev. John Douglas Ashplant (1920–2017)	Cheddar Valley	He was a free church adviser to Westward Television and made several appearances on their "Faith for Life" programmes.	
1981	Rev. Douglas Richard Westington (1920–2013)	Cheddar Valley		

== See also ==
- Church of St John the Baptist, Churchill
- Churchill, Somerset
- Jubilee Clock Tower, Churchill
- Sidney Hill
- Sidney Hill Cottage Homes
- Victoria Methodist Church
- Methodist Church of Great Britain
