= Jubilee Clock Tower, Churchill =

Building in Churchill, Somerset, England

Jubilee Clock Tower
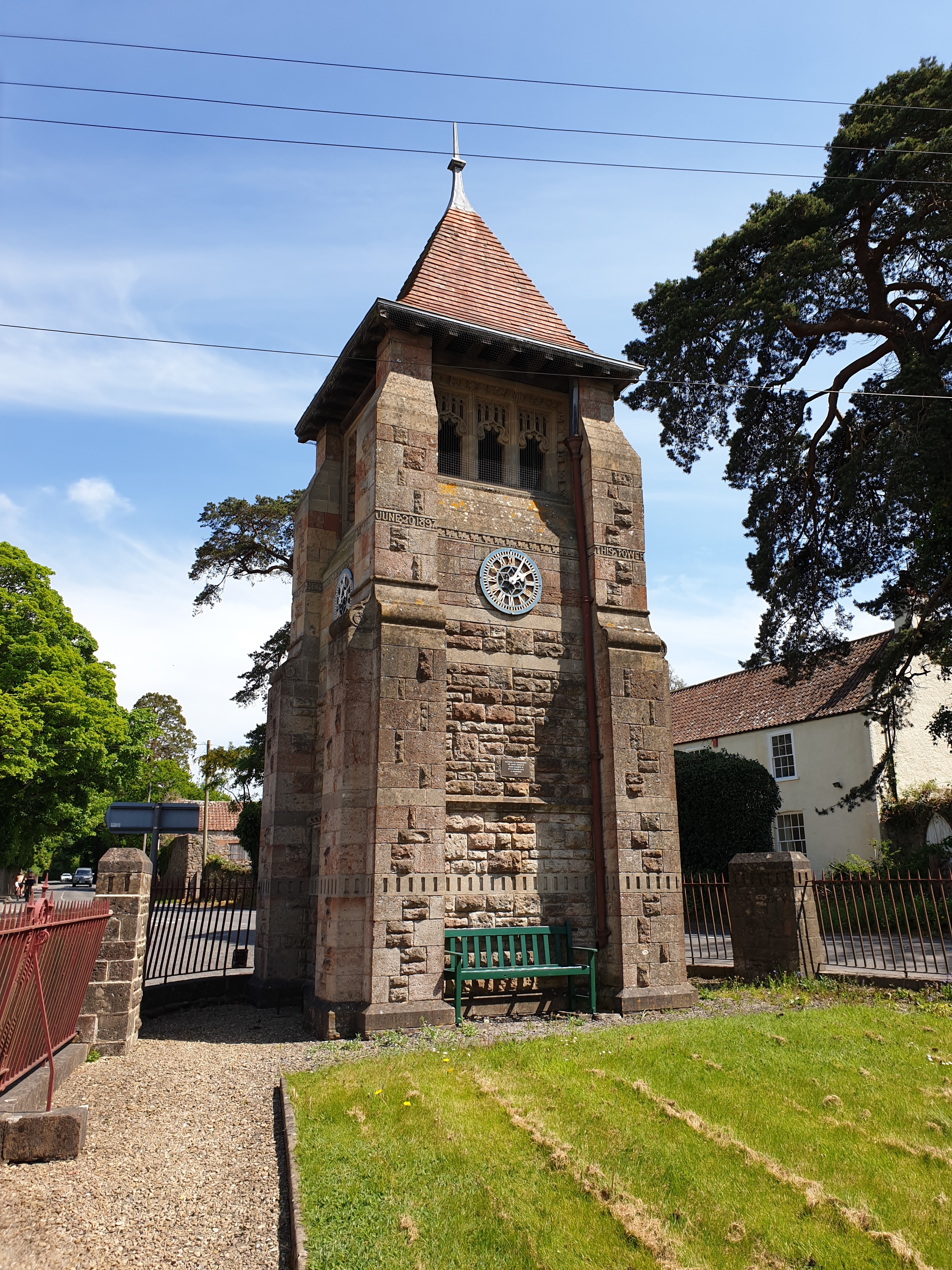
- Jubilee Clock Tower

- Location within Somerset
- 51.333996°N 2.799628°W
- Type: Clock tower
- Location: Churchill, North Somerset, England

History
- Founded: 1897 (129 years ago)
- Founder: Sidney Hill
- Built: 1898
- Built for: Diamond Jubilee of Queen Victoria

Site notes
- Height: 12 metres (40 feet)
- Architect: Joseph Foster Wood
- Architectural style: Perpendicular Gothic style
- Restored: 1976–77
- Governing body: Churchill parish council

Listed Building – Grade II
- Official name: Jubilee Clock Tower and attached walls and railings
- Designated: 19 January 1987 (39 years ago)
- Reference no.: 1129198

The Jubilee Clock Tower, striking clock, and drinking fountain, is a Grade II listed building in the village of Churchill, North Somerset, built to commemorate the Diamond Jubilee of Queen Victoria in 1897. It stands on a plot between Dinghurst Road and Front Street, and is a prominent landmark at the entrance to the village. Designed by Joseph Foster Wood of Foster & Wood, Bristol, the tower is made of local stone and is of perpendicular Gothic style.

The tower has a cast iron clock face on each of its four sides with one mechanism driving the clock hands. The escapement and clockwork was supplied by J. B. Joyce & Co in 1898 and is wound weekly by volunteers. The clock strikes the hours and chimes the Westminster Quarters. Responsibility for maintenance of the tower transferred to the parish council after the original trust could no longer afford to maintain it. The whole structure, tower, walls, and railings, was designated as a Grade II listed building on 19 January 1987, nearly ninety years after the tower was built.

== History ==
=== Inception ===
In 1897, Sidney Hill, a local businessman and benefactor, purchased the old turnpike house near the Nelson Arms pub in Churchill, North Somerset, and a house and plot of land between Dinghurst Road and Front Street, near the entrance to Churchill village. Both sites were in a state of disrepair and were unsightly. Hill planned to clear the old buildings and debris, plant ornamental shrubs, and enclose the plots with iron railings; similar in design to the then plantation in front of the nearby Methodist church and schoolroom that Hill had built in Front Street in 1881. Furthermore, his intention was to build a clock tower on the site to mark the Diamond Jubilee of Queen Victoria in 1897.

=== Design ===
Hill engaged Joseph Foster Wood of Foster & Wood, Bristol, to design the tower. Wood was the son and nephew of the founders of Foster & Wood. They were a busy architectural practice in Victorian Bristol and many landmark buildings in the city were designed by them, including Fosters Almshouse (1861), Colston Hall (1864), Grand Hotel, Broad Street (1864 to 1869), Bristol Grammar School (1875), and a large number of Wesleyan chapels. Hill had used the same practice to design the Methodist church and schoolroom at Churchill.

=== Build ===
The tower was built by the end of 1897, and in the following year, J. B. Joyce & Co installed the bell and clock mechanism. On 31 July 1901, Hill gifted the tower, and the adjacent schoolroom, to the Churchill Memorial Chapel and School Trust. Graham Clifford Awdry, Joseph Foster Wood's former business partner, wrote in Wood's obituary, "A charming memorial tower at Churchill, Somerset, is a good specimen of his originality." Julian Orbach, an architectural historian with an interest in Victorian buildings, has also described the tower as "[a] pretty Arts and Crafts Gothic clock tower." (Note: Julian Orbach, in his book Victorian Architecture in Britain (1987), attributes the tower's architectural design to Silcock and Reay, an architectural practice that was based in London and Bath. However, Andrew Foyle contradicts this attribution in his revised and enlarged edition of Nikolaus Pevsner's Somerset: North and Bristol (2011), where he states that the tower was designed by Foster & Wood.)

=== Restoration ===
By March 1974, the wall surrounding the tower was crumbling, and the tower stonework required pointing and cleaning. The clock's winding mechanism was also in a poor state of repair and it would have cost a thousand pounds to mechanise it. The trust responsible for the upkeep of the tower had an annual income of five hundred pounds and was paid twelve pounds (equivalent to eighty-five pounds in 2020) per year by the parish council to maintain the tower. The trust had asked for more help from the parish council as it was not possible to maintain the tower and the other church properties for which they were responsible.

It was recognised that the long-term future of the tower lay either with listing the tower as an historic monument or that the parish council take over the maintenance of the tower. By September 1976, the trust had applied to the Charity Commissioner to have its responsibilities transferred to the parish council. In the same month, John Edgar Howard Smith, the managing director of Smith of Derby Group, the holding company of J. B. Joyce & Co, wrote to the parish council offering to carry out a free survey of the clock, although at the time of Smith's letter, the trust had recently refurbished and renovated the mechanism at a cost of two hundred pounds.

In 1977, for the Queen's Silver Jubilee, the tower was cleaned by Arthur Raymond "Ray" Millard, a former chair of Churchill parish council, and a team of volunteers. In 1979, their work on restoring the tower was commemorated through a plaque affixed to the west side of the tower. In the 1980s, Millard was interviewed about his life and work as site manager for the construction of Bristol City Hall. A cassette tape recording and transcript of this interview is held in the archives of Bristol Museum & Art Gallery.

=== Maintenance ===
On 25 October 1978, the parish council established a charitable trust to maintain the clock and tower as a public amenity. The Open Spaces and Allotments committee of the council is now responsible for the upkeep and maintenance of the tower. In 1980, contractors were engaged by the council to treat the tower with a chemical to discourage pigeons from roosting and soiling the ornamental stonework. On 19 January 1987, the tower was designated as a Grade II listed building, and in the same year, overgrown moss was removed from the wall and iron railings surrounding the tower. In 2017, the clock was repaired and serviced, and the tower wall enclosure on Front Street rebuilt. The tower was opened to the public in the weeks leading up to the Platinum Jubilee Central Weekend at the beginning of June 2022.

== Features and architecture ==
The tower has a cast iron clock face on each of its four sides, with Roman numerals indicating twelve hours on each face. The clocks are attached to a square tower that has buttresses to the first floor. One mechanism drives the faces on all sides of the tower. The second floor holds the bell and a clockwork that is wound weekly by volunteers.

Features and architecture

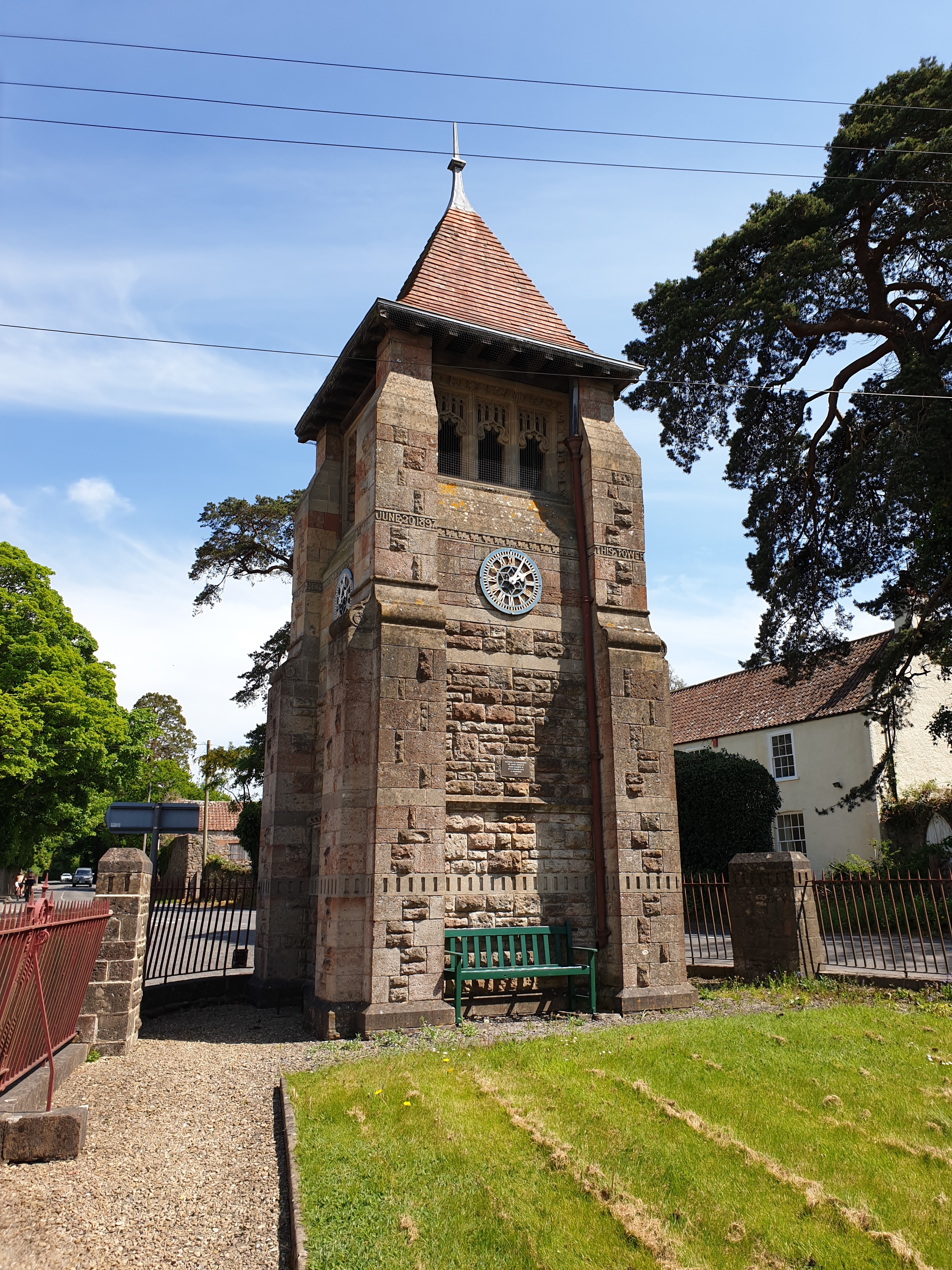

1	Pyramidal, plain‑tiled roof
2	Bracketted eaves cornice
3	Three cusped and panelled tracery lights in paterae surrounds
4	Clasping buttress
5	Inscription on string course
6	Cast iron clock face
7	Console

8	Squared and coursed rockfaced sandstone
9	Ashlar dressings (Note: Ashlar consists of cut stone blocks that are squared so that smooth sides make fine joints so that level courses are possible. It is often used to face walls built of rubblestone, brick, or concrete.)
10	Buttress
11	Doorway with two trefoil‑cusped side windows under a paterae frieze
12	Walls with piers and coved tops
13	Spear railings with wrought iron decorative panels at intervals
14	Entrance gate

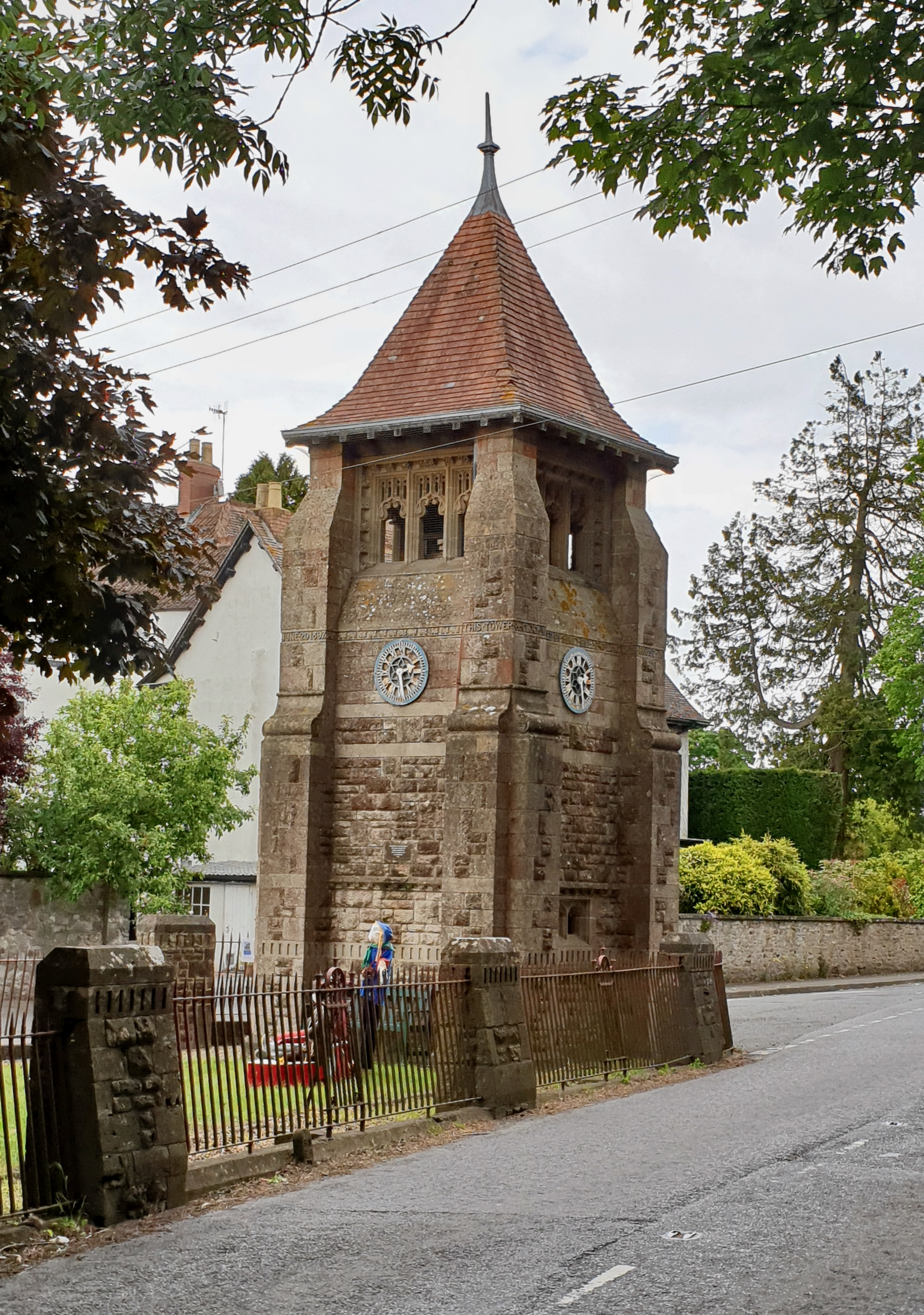
The tower as photographed from Dinghurst Road, Churchill (west side)

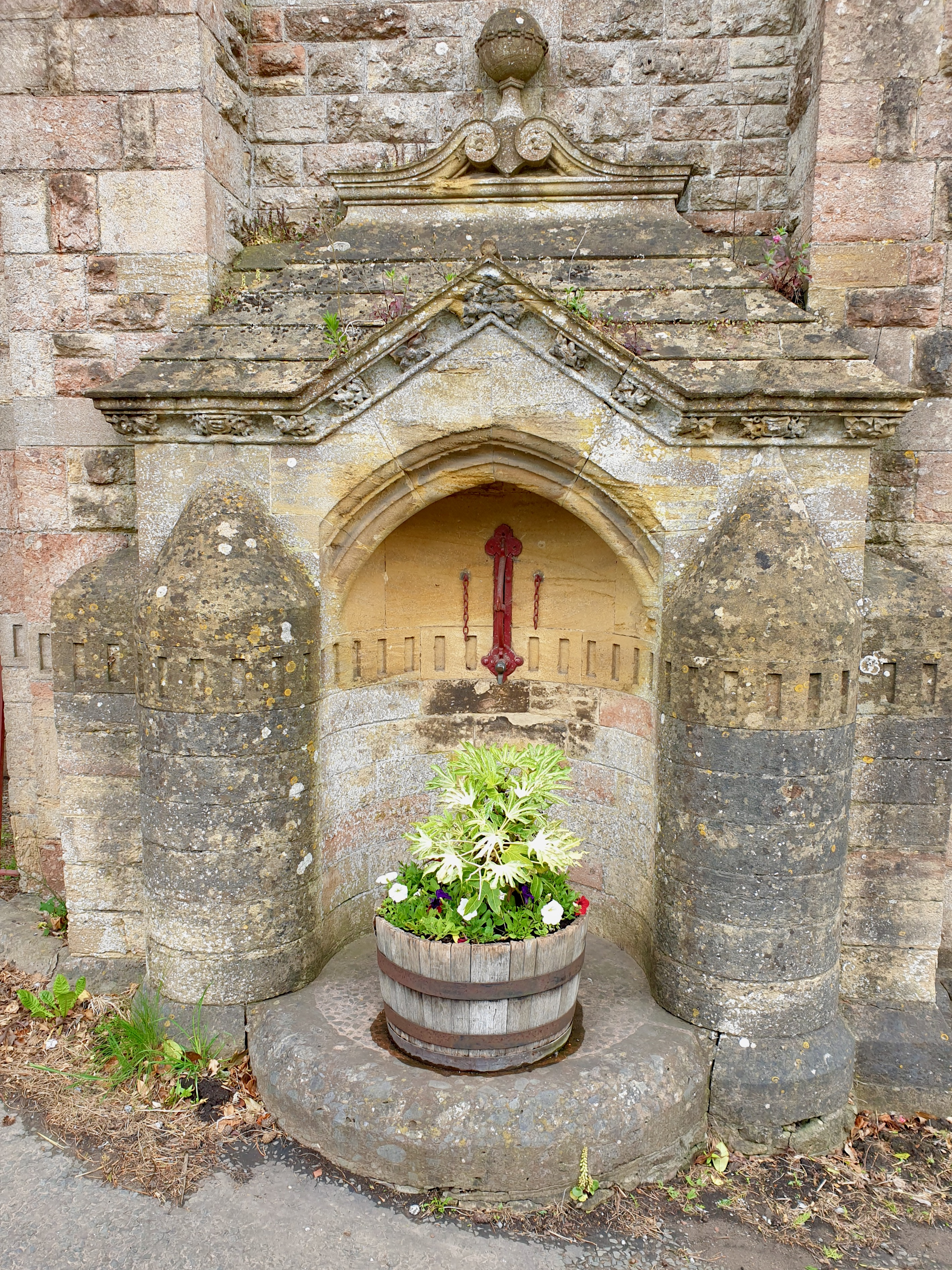
Drinking fountain with cast iron tap and water pump fittings (east side)

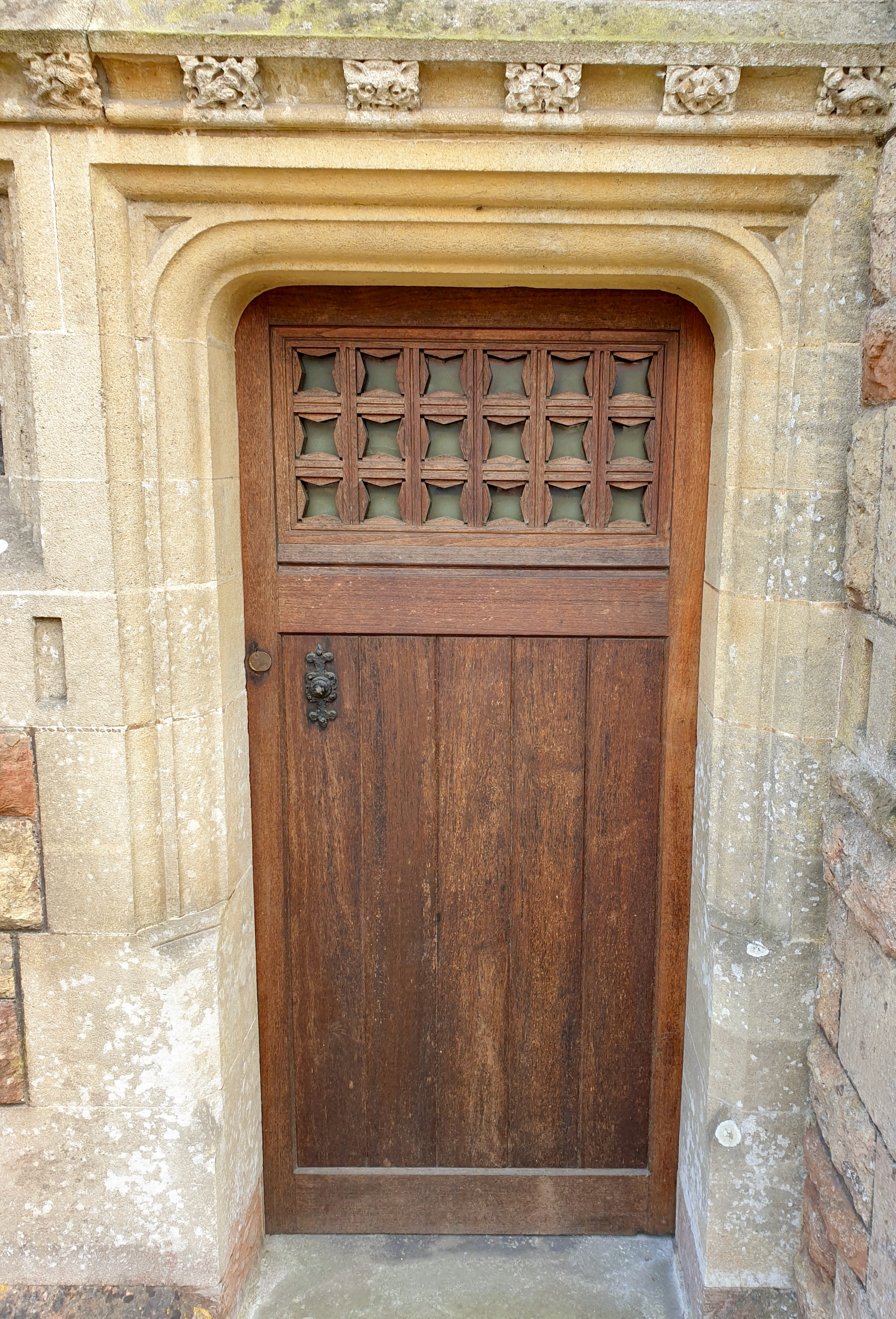
Entry to the tower is through a wooden door (north side)

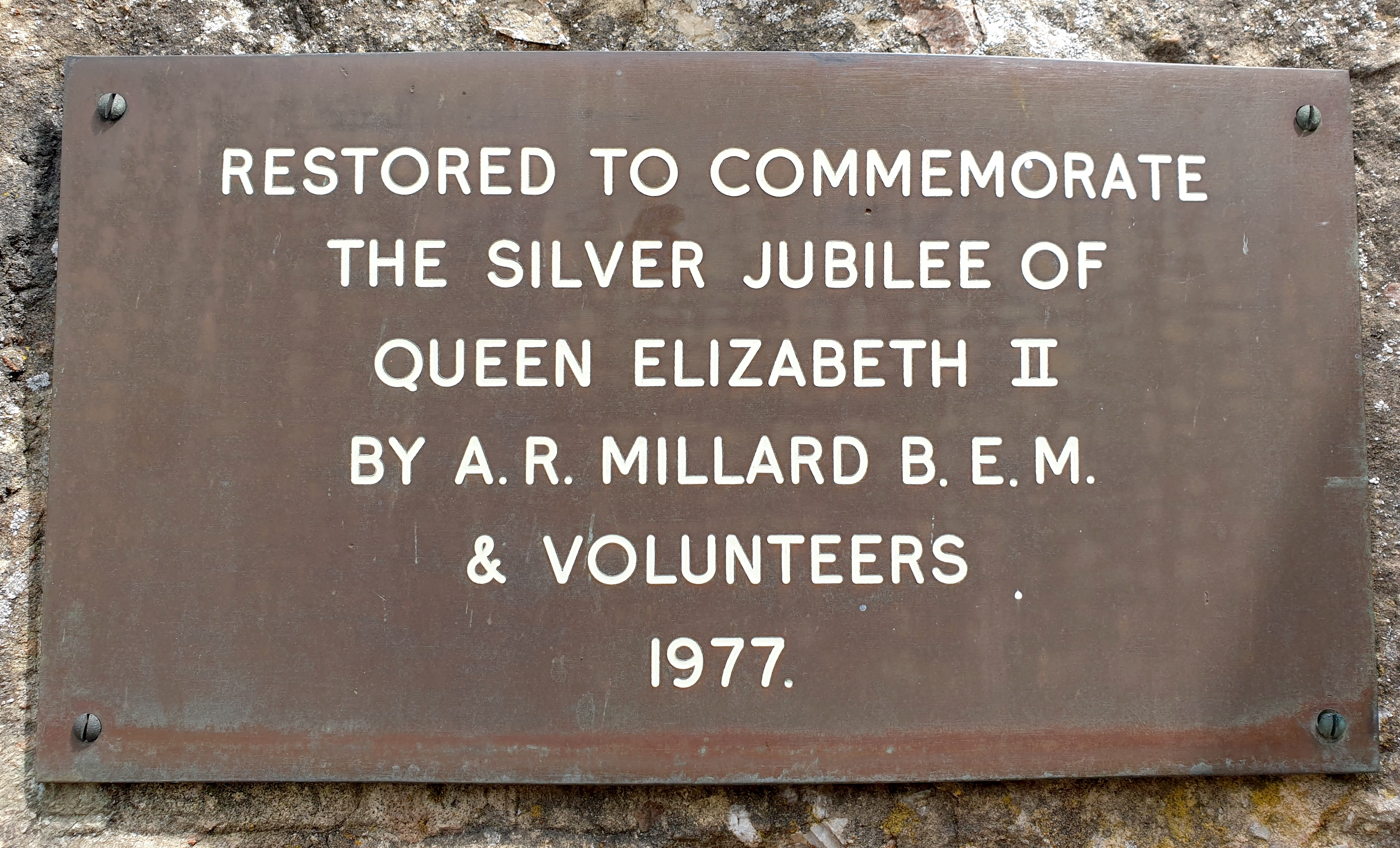
Plaque commemorating the volunteers who cleaned the tower for the Queen's Silver Jubilee (west side)

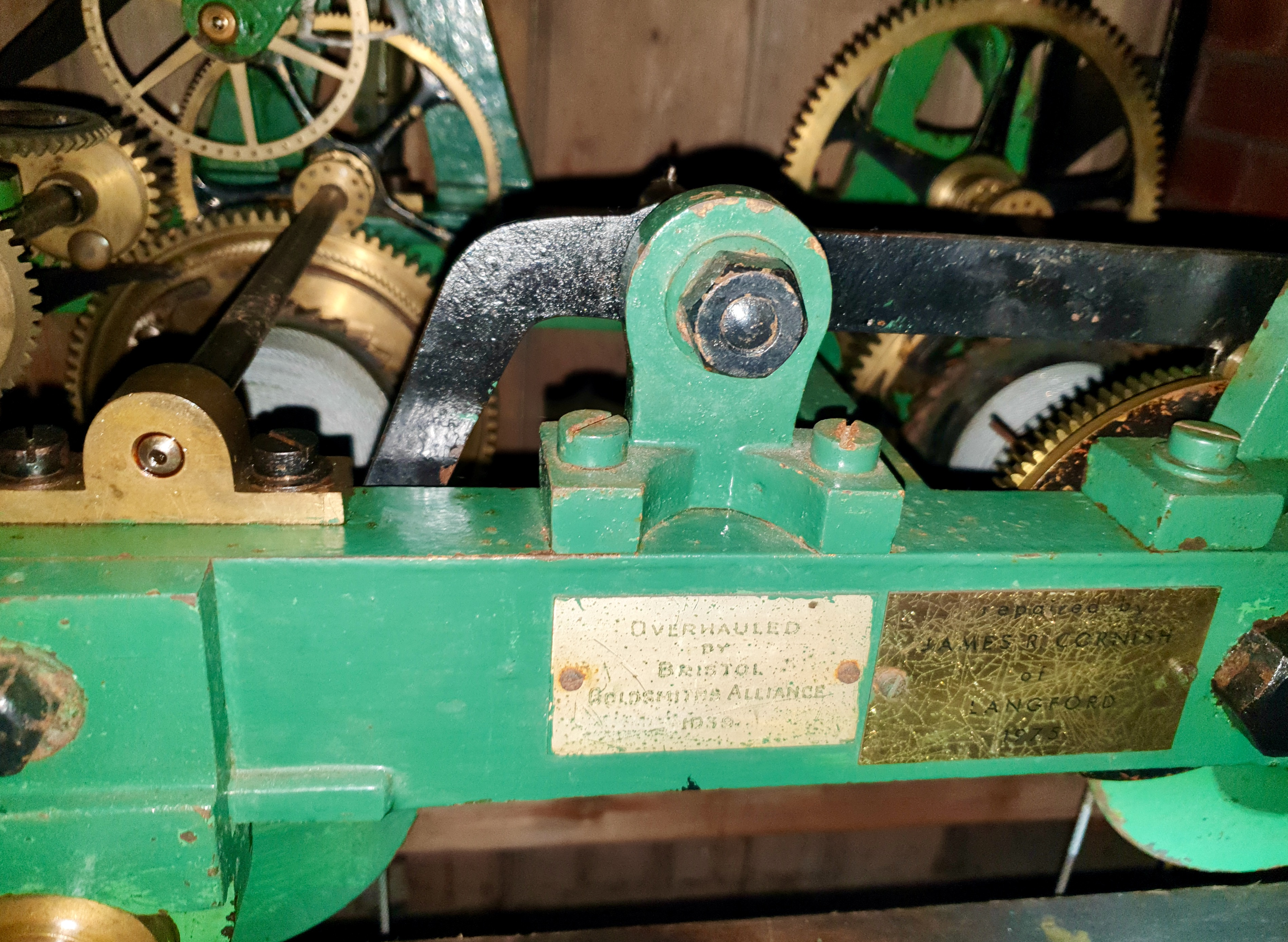
Clockwork installed on the second floor of the tower

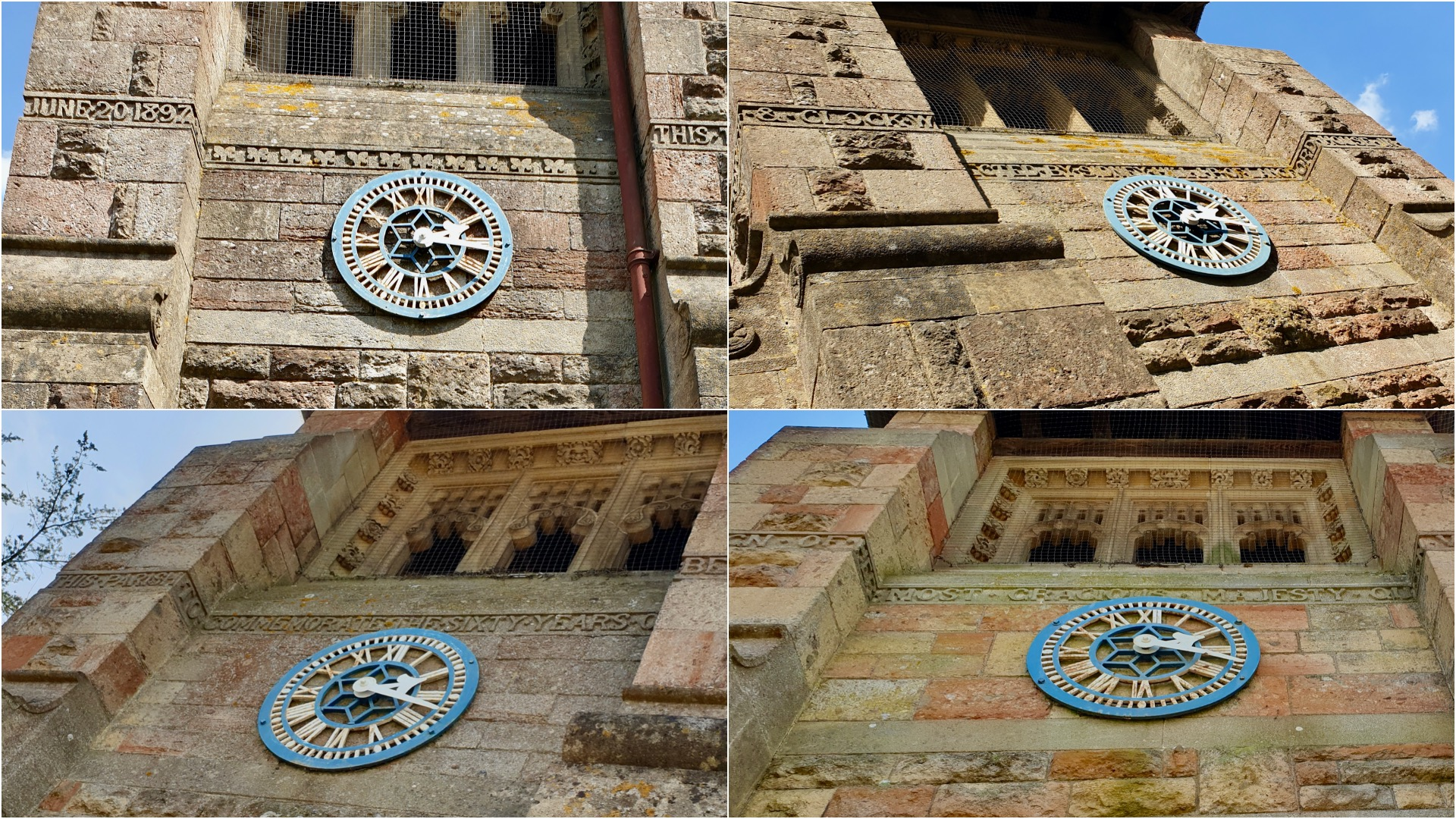
The four clock faces located on each side of the tower

A drinking fountain, with a cast iron tap and water pump fittings, is built into a niche on the east side of the tower. (Note: The fountain was intended to provide drinking water "for man and beast".) A bench has been installed outside the Reading Room in the tower enclosure and a new pathway constructed to provide disabled access. The inscription on the string course above the clock faces, and below the bell floor, reads as follows:

- West: "June 20, 1897. This tower"
- South: "& clock was erected by Sidney Hill J.P., of Langford House, in"
- East: "this parish, to commemorate the sixty years of the beneficent"
- North: "reign of Her Most Gracious Majesty Queen Victoria."

== See also ==
- Churchill, Somerset
- Clock tower
- Clock Tower, Clevedon
- List of clocks
- Sidney Hill
