= Chapel of the Three Kings of Cologne =

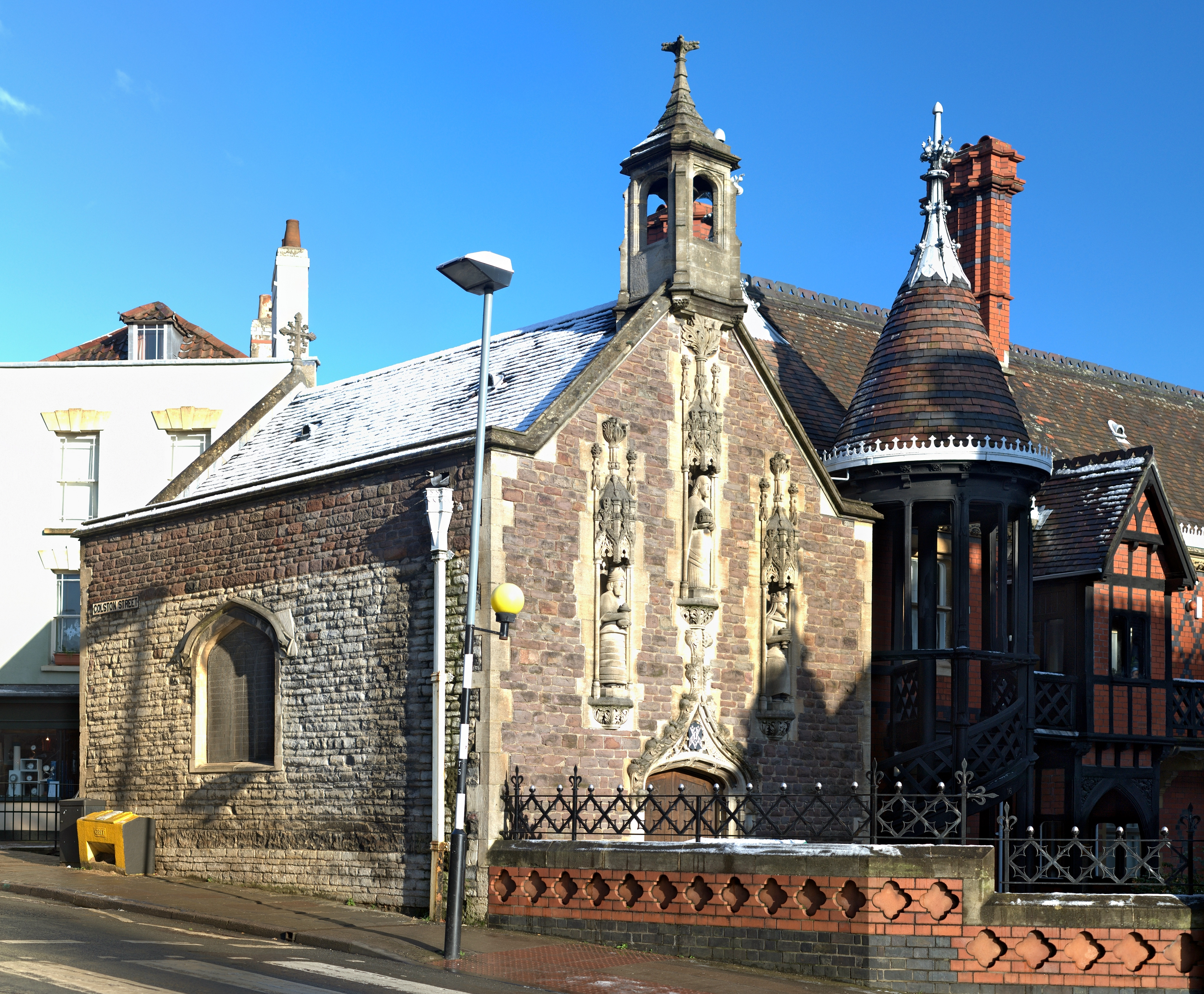

- Location within Bristol

General information
- Location: Bristol, England
- Coordinates: 51.456121°N 2.597164°W
- Completed: 1504

The Chapel of the Three Kings of Cologne is a church in Colston Street, near the top of Christmas Steps, Bristol, England. It has been designated as a Grade II* listed building.

The Three Kings of Cologne refers to the Biblical Magi. The dedication is a reference to the Shrine of the Three Kings in Cologne Cathedral, Germany. One of the windows shows the nativity of Jesus, which may have contributed to the naming of the Christmas Steps.

The chapel was built by John Foster in 1504. He was previously the local High Sheriff, mayor, and member of parliament for the city. The church serves as the chapel for Foster's Almshouses. The master of the almshouses was responsible for maintaining the chapel and appointing a priest.

It was refaced and roofed in 1861 by Foster and Wood, with further restoration in 1865 which included niches for the installation of carvings. The three current statues were designed by Ernest Pascoe and installed in the 1960s. On the gable above the statues is a small bellcote.

== Current use ==
As of 2007 the adjoining Foster's Almshouses have been remodeled into private residences, with the chapel available for the use of residents.

== See also ==
- Grade II* listed buildings in Bristol
- List of churches in Bristol
