= Church of Our Lady of Ostrobrama, Bristol =

Church building in England

Coordinates: 51°27′58.090″N 2°35′27.715″W

Church of Our Lady of Ostrobrama
- Kościół Matki Bożej Ostrobramskiej
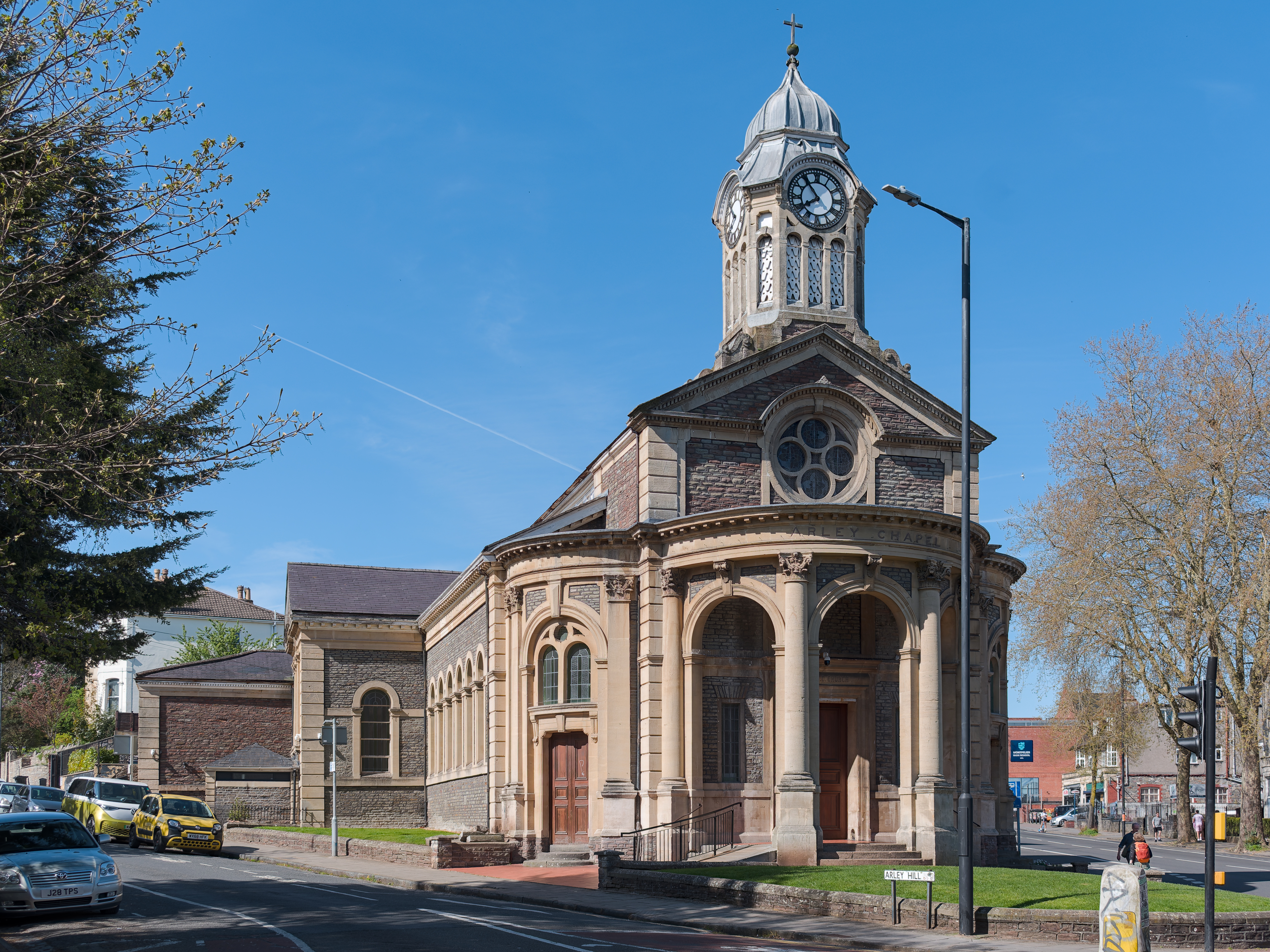
- Church of Our Lady of Ostrobrama
- Address: 2 Arley Hill, Cotham, Bristol, England
- Denomination: Roman Catholic
- Previous denomination: Congregational
- Website: www.parafiabristol.uk

History
- Status: Parish church
- Founded: 1855
- Dedication: Our Lady of the Gate of Dawn

Architecture
- Functional status: Active
- Heritage designation: Grade II
- Architect(s): Foster & Wood
- Style: Italianate
- Completed: June 1855
- Construction cost: £4,000 (1855)

Administration
- Diocese: Clifton

Our Lady of Ostrobrama (Polish: Kościół Matki Bożej Ostrobramskiej), formerly Arley Chapel, is a mid-19th-century church on Arley Hill, Cotham, Bristol, England. Built in 1855 as a Congregational chapel to designs by Foster & Wood, it has been the principal Polish Roman Catholic church in Southwest England since 1968, and is a Grade II listed building.

The church serves an estimated 1,200 worshippers and functions as a regional centre for the Polish Catholic Mission. In May 2016 it hosted a gathering of eighty Polish clergy for the Extraordinary Jubilee of Mercy.

Traditional Polish devotions remain prominent; hundreds attend the annual Święconka. The premises also serve the wider diaspora as a polling station for Polish national elections.

== History ==
=== Congregational period (1855–1968) ===
The chapel was erected in 1855 at the expense of an anonymous benefactor who stipulated that it carry the name of the Worcestershire village of Arley. Foster & Wood provided an Italianate design on a cruciform plan, dominated by a semicircular portico of four Corinthian columns and a clocktower surmounted by a cupola. Contemporary chronicler John Latimer described it as "the last dissenting chapel of any importance erected in the city in the Italian style". The inaugural service was preached by the Rev. J. Angell James in June 1855, and the building was registered for marriages in November 1856.

After more than a century of Congregational worship, the chapel closed in 1968; the remaining congregation united with Christ Church in Cotham.

=== Acquisition by the Polish Catholic Mission (1968–present) ===
Trustees for the Polish community purchased the vacant building in July 1968, and it was re-registered that September as the Polish Church of Our Lady of Mercy. The church was consecrated on 4 August 1968 by Bishops Władysław Rubin and Joseph Rudderham.

From 1978 to 2002, the parish was led by Paweł Przybylski, whose extensive repairs earned an award from Bristol City Council. Since 2013, the priest has been Stanisław Łabuda.

=== 2013 fire ===
On 4 November 2013 a fire, believed to have started accidentally by candles, destroyed the side altar and a historic stained-glass window and damaged part of the roof. Two parishioners were treated for smoke inhalation, and the priest, who attempted to put out the fire, was injured. Within six days, volunteers enabled the church to reopen to mark Polish Independence Day on 11 November. Restoration of the interior and a replacement icon of the Gate of Dawn were completed in the following year.

== Architecture ==
The building is an exemplar of mid-Victorian classicism. Its Bath-stone west front presents a full-height semicircular portico, above which a circular window of four lights illuminates the nave. A timber-framed clerestory runs the length of the unaisled nave, flanked by short transepts and terminating in an apsidal sanctuary.

== See also ==
- John Foster (architect, born 1830)
- Grade II listed buildings in Bristol
