= John Foster (architect, born 1830) =

British architect (1830–1880)

John Foster (30 May 1830 - 4 June 1880), was an English architect and partner in the architectural practice of Foster & Wood of Park Street, Bristol who designed a number of well known buildings erected in Bristol in the 19th century. "It must sometimes seem that the whole of 19th-century Bristol, or at least all of its significant buildings, owed their design to the firm of Foster and Wood".

== Early life ==
Foster was born in the parish of Westbury-on-Trym, now a suburb of Bristol, but then in Gloucestershire, on 30 May 1830. He was baptised at the parish church of St Augustine the Less, which stood next to Bristol Cathedral on College Green, on 25 June 1830. He was the son of Thomas Foster and his wife, Sarah Fowler. The Fosters were a well-known family of local architects and surveyors and John joined his father's firm in the 1840s

== Foster & Wood architects ==
Joseph Wood (1822-1905) had worked with Foster's father, Thomas, who died in 1849, and from 1849 the firm was known as Foster & Wood. In 1854 Joseph Wood married John Foster's sister, Catherine, and of their two sons, Thomas Foster Wood and Joseph Foster Wood, Joseph is known to have been associated with the practice. Foster & Wood have been described as the "most active and ..most consistent architectural firm in Bristol" and it has been suggested that John Foster specialised in the Italianate style favoured in the mid nineteenth century, while Joseph Wood's work inclined to the Gothic. Their work ranged from church building and restoration to the design of schools, workhouses, private dwellings and commercial property.

== Bristol buildings ==
The following buildings were designed by the practice during John Foster's lifetime.

- 1853: The Athenaeum, Corn Street
- 1855: Victoria Square, Clifton, South West Range
- 1857: Muller's Orphanage, Ashley Down (second stage work begun 1855)
- 1859: Royal Promenade, Queen's Road
- 1861: Foster's Almshouse, Colston Street
- 1861: Archway to Boyce's Avenue, Victoria Square
- 1862: Temple Colston School, Victoria Street
- 1864: Grand Hotel, Broad Street
- 1864: Colston Hall, Colston Street
- 1867: Bristol Museum and Library, Queen's Road
- 1875: Bristol Grammar School, University Road
- 1878: Bengough's Almshouse, Horfield Road

== Ecclesiastical architecture ==
Foster & Wood were responsible for ecclesiastical restorations throughout the West Country, as well as further afield.

- 1854: Arley Chapel, Arley Hill (total cost about £3900)
- 1855/6: Congregational Church, Hill Street, Clevedon, Somerset
- 1856: Moravian Church, Kingswood, Gloucestershire
- 1856/7: Holy Trinity, Burrington, Somerset restoration
- 1862: St John the Evangelist's Church, Kenn, Somerset restoration
- 1864/5: St Lawrence's church, Wick St Lawrence, Somerset restoration
- 1869: St David's Church Prendergast, Pembrokeshire rebuilding
- 1871: St George's Brandon Hill, fittings
- 1871/2: St Michael and All Angels, Dinder, Somerset restoration

== Methodist connection ==
Joseph Wood was the son of a Wesleyan minister, also called Joseph Wood, and it has been said that the firm had a near monopoly of Methodist building in the city.

- 1857: Wesleyan Day School, Backfields
- 1858: Wesleyan Chapel, Midsomer Norton, Somereset
- 1860: Victoria Wesleyan Church, Queen's Road
- 1860: Hanham Wesleyan Schools
- 1864: Wesleyan Church, Portland Street, Kingsdown
- 1879: Methodist chapel, Front Street, Churchill, Somerset

== Buildings outside Bristol ==
- 1850: Frankfort Hall, Clevedon, Somerset
- 1857: Wrington School, Somerset
- 1859/60 Market Hall, Midsomer Norton, Somerset
- 1859: Ilfracombe Schools, Devon

== Later life ==
Foster continued to live with his family, first in Park Street and then at South Parade, Clifton, until his marriage on 9 April 1874 at St John's Church, Taunton to Catherine Walkey Gillett, daughter of George Gillett. Foster & Wood appeared regularly in the local newspapers as architects and surveyors to the Bristol Charities Trust, but there is a pause in their activity between 1873 and 1876, which is probably related to Foster's health; his obituary says he died after a long illness. Directories gave his residence as Weston Villa, Carlton Place between 1875 and 1878. He died on 4 June 1880 at Chelsea.
