= Victoria Methodist Church =

Methodist church in Somerset, England

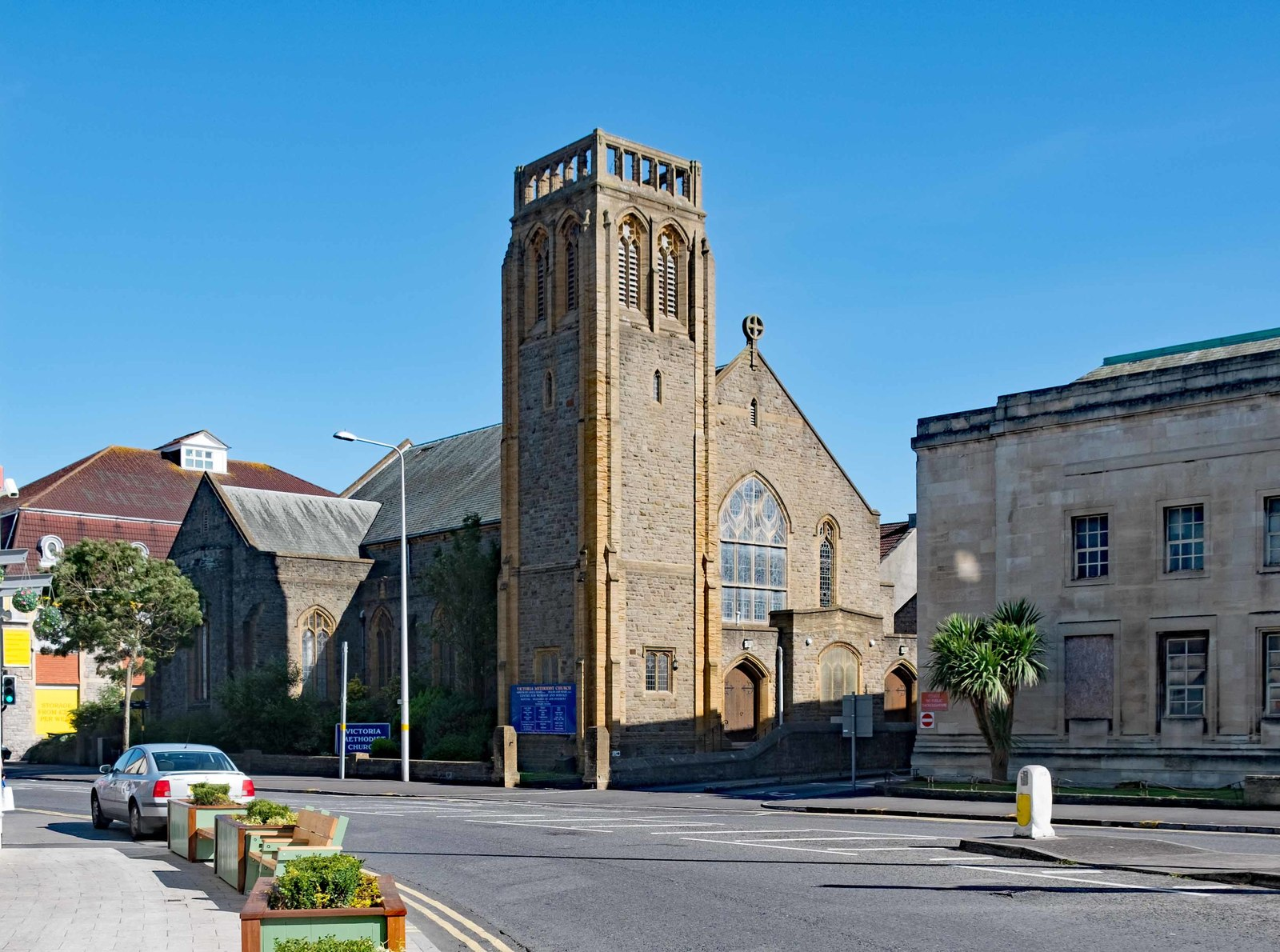

Religion
- Affiliation: Methodist
- Ecclesiastical or organizational status: Closed

Location
- Location: Weston-super-Mare, Somerset, England
- Interactive map of Victoria Methodist Church
- Coordinates: 51.3453°N 2.9752°W

Architecture
- Architects: Fry, Paterson and Jones of Weston-super-Mare
- Type: Church
- Completed: 1936

Victoria Methodist Church is a former Methodist church in Weston-super-Mare, Somerset, England. The original church of 1899-1900 was destroyed by fire in 1934. It was replaced by the current church, which was designed by Fry, Paterson and Jones of Weston-super-Mare and built in 1935-36. The church closed as a place of worship in 2020 and became the venue of the Boost Rebound Therapy and Trampolining Club in 2026.

== History ==
The original Victoria Methodist Church was built in 1899-1900 to replace the town's Wesleyan Methodist chapel of 1847. It was designed by Mr. W. J. Morley of Bradford and built by Mr. William Gibson of Exeter. The memorial stones were laid on 20 November 1899 and the church opened by Mr. T. P. Wansbrough on 13 September 1900.

The church was a victim of fire on 5 February 1934, which reduced the building to a shell. It was believed the fire originated from a fuse of the organ's electrical apparatus and quickly spread across the church's wooden furnishings. Plans were then made for the construction of a replacement on the same site, with the possible inclusion and restoration of the surviving north wall and tower. A sum of £17,285 was received from the insurance company and Messrs Fry, Paterson and Jones of Weston-super-Mare drew up plans for the new church.

Progress of the new church scheme was delayed when Weston-super-Mare Urban Council revealed their intention of a road widening scheme for Station Road. The church's trustees believed the council's scheme would result in "heavy additional expenses" for the new church, as it would force the "demolition of existing masonry, the withdrawal of the building line, and the provision of new foundations". Some of the local congregation protested against the demolition of the surviving parts of the ruined church, but the site was cleared later in 1934. The trustees and council came to an agreement over the road widening scheme by the end of the year, with the council purchasing the additional land required from the trustees for £700.

Messrs Bryant and Son of Birmingham were hired as builders of the new church in December 1934. On 6 March 1935, the chief foundation stone was laid by Mrs. Walter Robinson of Bath, the sister of the former superintendent of the Weston-super-Mare circuit, Rev. J. Walthew Simister. A further sixty-three stones were then laid by various donors, some of which had been salvaged from the previous church.

The new Victoria Methodist Church was opened by Mrs. W. H. Chamings of Burnham-on-Sea on 2 January 1936. Mrs. Chamings was the widowed wife of Rev. W. H. Chamings, one of the earliest resident ministers of the former church, and mother of Rev. W. Loxley Chamings, one of the ministers at the new church. The total cost of the new church was £19,460, £250 of which was still to be raised at the time of the church's opening.

=== Closure of church in 2020 and current use ===
In 2020, the church closed permanently as a place of worship. Due to the COVID-19 pandemic, the church was struggling financially and had limited voluntary help available to continue running for its largely elderly congregation, most of whom were unable to attend due to lockdown measures. A final service was held on 10 October 2020.

On 20 April 2026, the former church reopened as the venue of the Boost Rebound Therapy and Trampolining Club. It operates as a specialist centre for structured therapeutic and recreational sessions, and is used for rebound therapy and trampolining activities.

== Architecture ==
Victoria Methodist Church is constructed of local stone, with facings in Nailsea stone and dressings in Hamstone. The walls are lined with brick internally. The church is designed in the Gothic style and was influenced by the design of the Methodist Church at Boscombe. It was built to accommodate 700 persons and has a tower, 65 feet in height.

Original fittings included an oak pulpit on a base of Portland stone. The font, reading desk, altar table, vestibule table and other fittings were made from English oak. The organ was built and installed by the John Compton Organ Company Ltd. The stained glass of the east window depicts Sacrifice and Victory, and is a memorial to the local men who lost their lives during World War I. Although it had suffered significant damage, the war memorial tablet from the former church was salvaged, repaired and placed over the inner west door.
