= Grand Hotel, Bristol =

Hotel in Bristol, England

The Grand Hotel
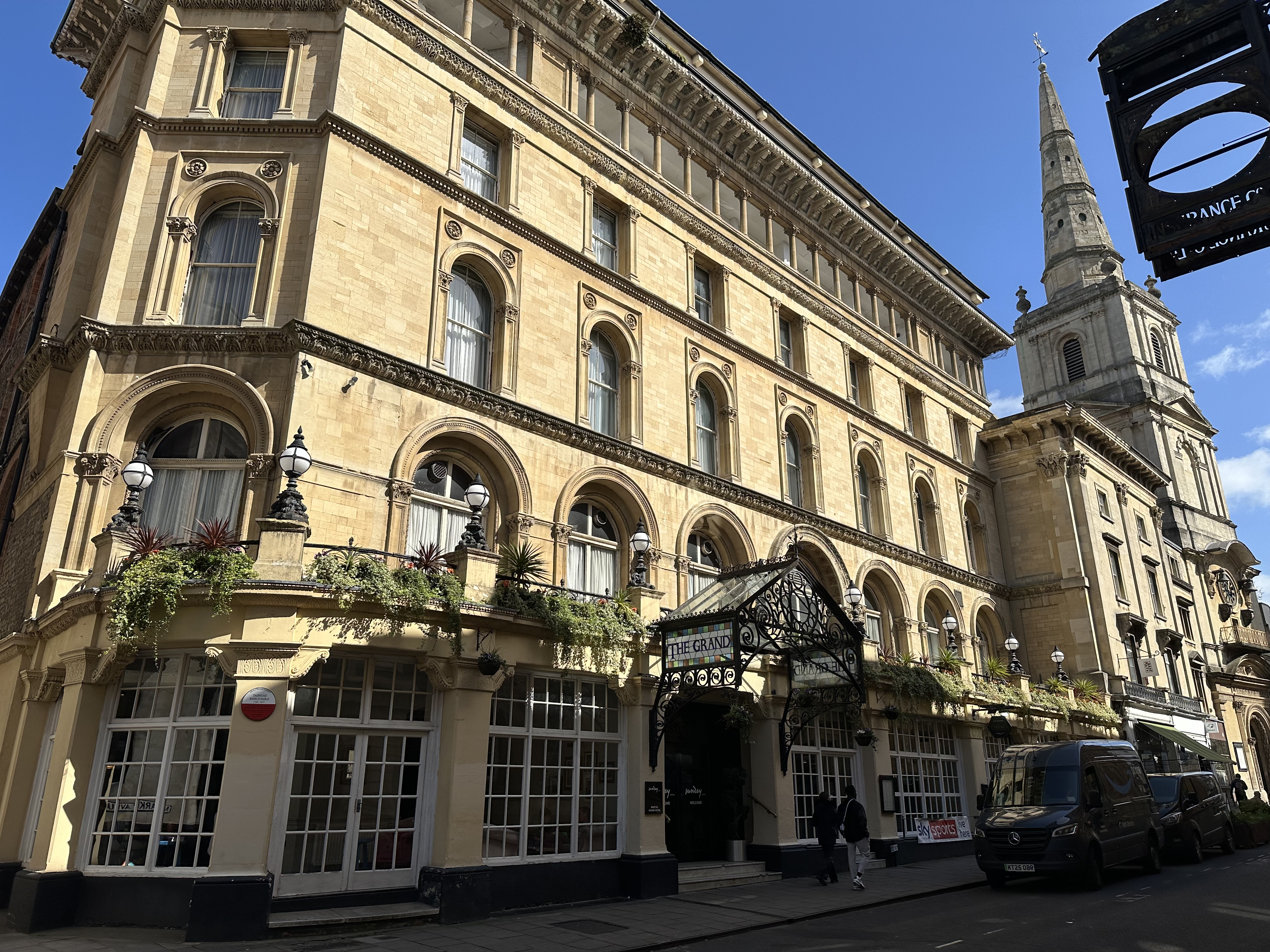
- The Grand Hotel, 2026

- Location within Bristol
- 51°27′19″N 2°35′36″W
- Type: Hotel
- Location: Broad Street, Bristol

Site notes
- Area: Bristol
- Owner: Marriott Hotels & Resorts

Listed Building – Grade II
- Official name: The Grand Hotel, Bristol
- Designated: 1966
- Reference no.: 1202023

The Grand Hotel (Grand Hotel by Sunday) is a hotel in a Grade II Listed Building in Broad Street in Bristol, England. The current building opened in 1869 and has been visited by several celebrities, including the Beatles and the Rolling Stones. It is currently owned and managed by Sunday Hotels.

== Location ==
The Grand Hotel is on Broad Street in the old city . It a short distance from St John's gate, one of the original gateways to Bristol.

== History ==
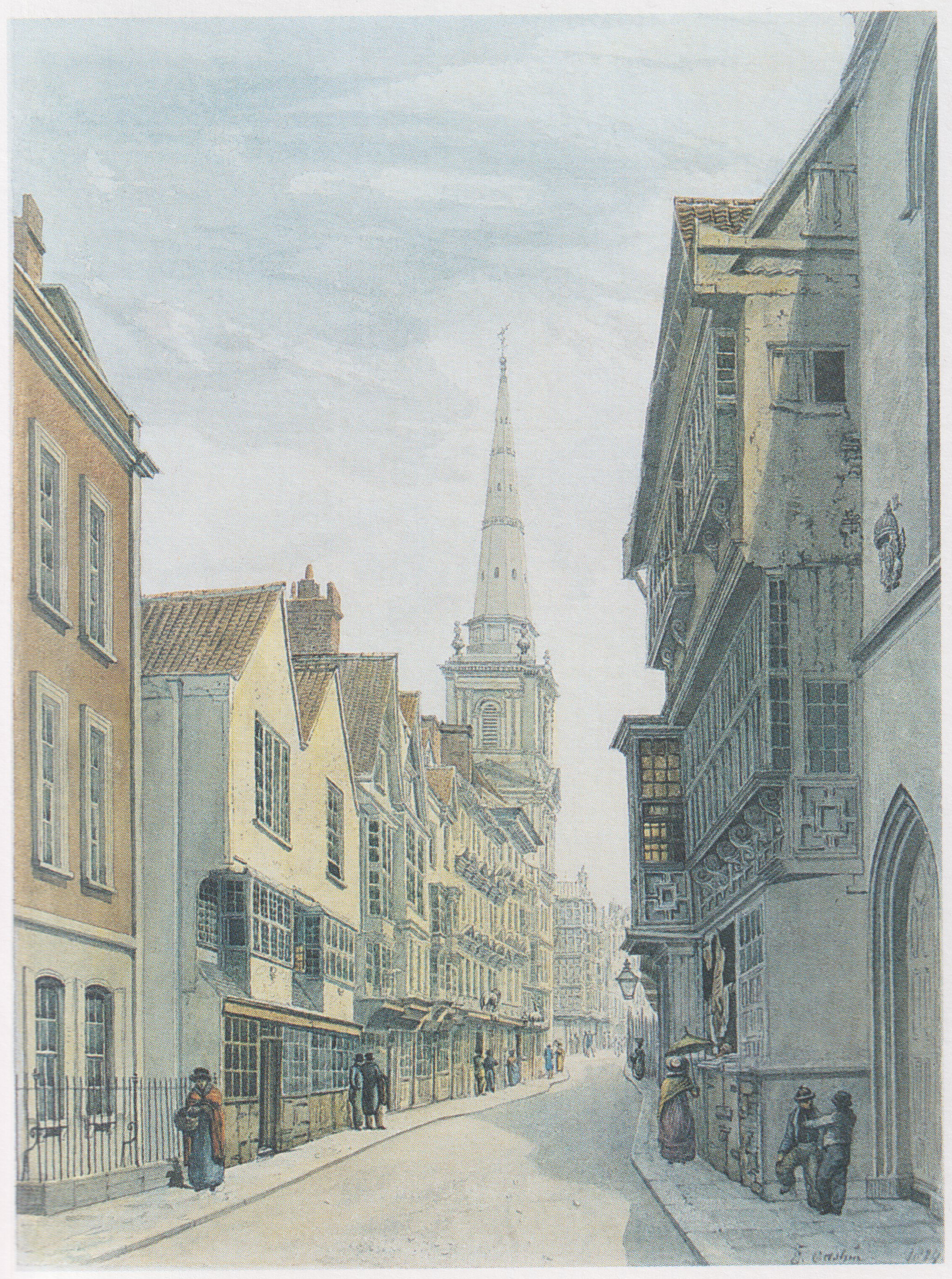
Looking up Broad Street to the White Lion Inn, 1824

The hotel dates back to at least 1517, when it was known as the "Whyt Lyon", or White Lion Inn. It became one of Bristol's most prestigious inns, the Duke of Brunswick staying there in 1610 during a tour of England and the Earl of Essex during an official visit to the city in 1621. Both the White Lyon and its medieval neighbour, the White Hart, were among those admitted to Bristol's 'Guild of Innholders' established in March 1606.

Described by the Victorian historian and journalist, John Latimer, as Bristol's "long-famed hostelry", the White Lion was often used as a focus for political meetings and visits, particularly by Tories. One of these resulted in the inn being attacked by arsonists on 8 July 1685, when the Duke of Beaufort was staying there while helping to put down the Monmouth Rebellion.

During the 18th century the White Lion continued to be the favourite rendezvous for leading Tory merchants and, in particular, those who approved of George III's policy in British North America during the 1770s. At this time the inn included an establishment called the American Coffee House, which was renamed the British Coffee House in 1785, following the American Revolution. In the late 18th century and early 19th century the inn was the base for the Tory White Lion Club, which led to it being the focus for violent battles during contested elections. It continued to be a Tory stronghold into the mid-19th century, Sir Robert Peel staying there in 1840.

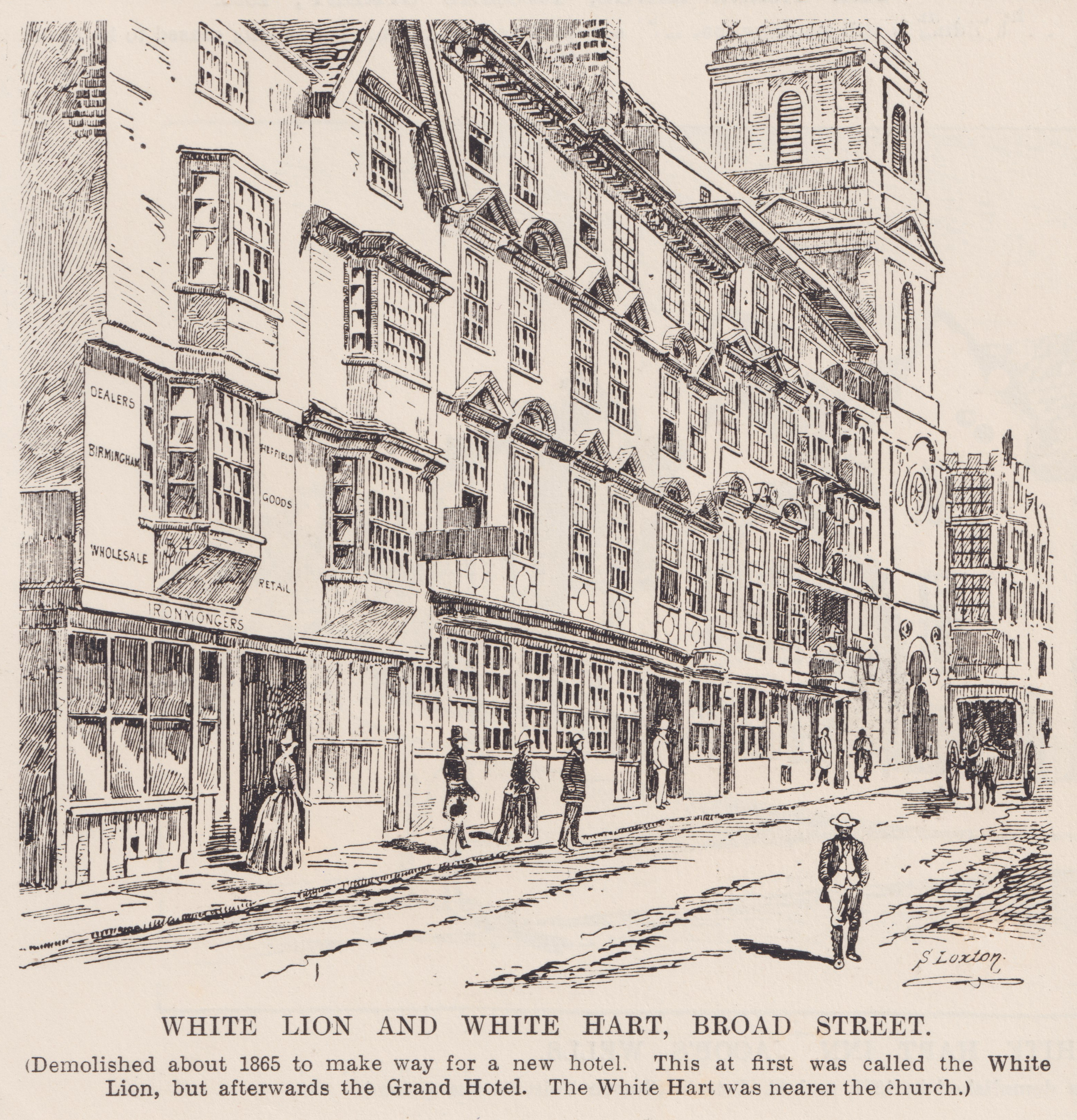
White Lion Inn, c. 1864

The current structure was built by the Bristol City Hotel Company, established in March 1863. It acquired the White Lion inn, the adjacent White Hart inn and the smaller Plume of Feathers inn. Demolition of the White Lion and White Hart started in 1865, but works proved much more costly than anticipated and the company almost went bankrupt. The new hotel, still called the White Lion, opened January 1869. In 1874 the Plume of Feathers was rebuilt as an annex to the main building and at the same time the establishment was renamed The Grand Hotel.

The new building was designed by the Bristol architects John Foster and Joseph Wood. The hotel was constructed of limestone ashlar, in a rectangular Italianate Renaissance style. An attic storey was added during the 20th century. The interior was also extensively altered during this time.

During World War I, the Grand Hotel was one of four receiving depots in Bristol for donated wartime medical and troop supplies. In World War II, the hotel was used as a residence for various agents, politicians and royalty and served as a link between London and Bristol Airport. It was Grade II listed in 1966.

In 2013, the Russian emigre Nikolai Glushkov became ill there, in a suspected poisoning incident.

The hotel was renovated in 2017 in a £5 million refurbishment program, and became known as the Mercure Bristol Grand Hotel. It has 186 rooms, and is extensively decorated with art by local Bristol artists. Since 2025 it has been known as the Grand Hotel by Sunday, which is part of OYO Rooms.

== Cultural references ==
Several celebrities have stayed at the hotel, including The Beatles, Cary Grant and Leslie Howard. In 1964, the Rolling Stones were refused entry into the hotel's bar, because they were not wearing jackets.

The hotel was featured in the BBC production of The Trial of Christine Keeler in 2019. During filming, it was briefly closed.

== Official Website ==
Bristol Grand Hotel by Sunday
