= Foster's Almshouses, Bristol =

Historic almshouses in Bristol, England

Foster's Almshouse
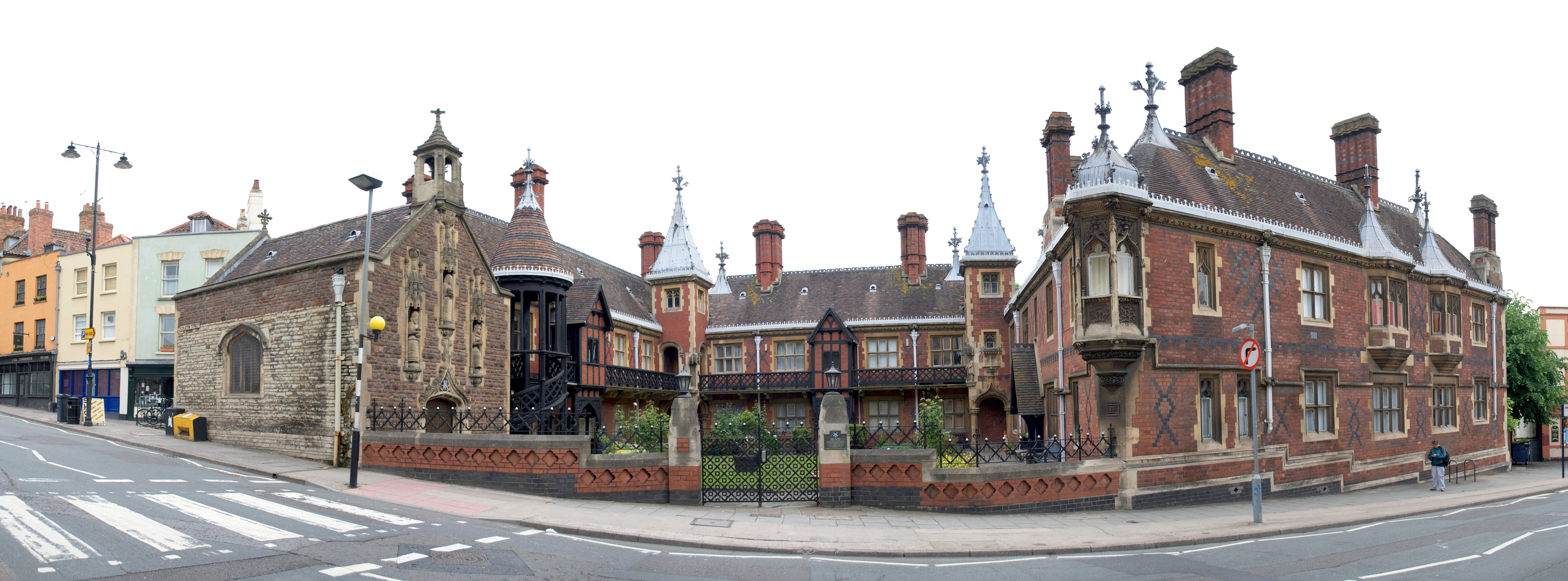
- Foster's Almshouses with the Chapel of the Three Kings of Cologne

- Location within Bristol

General information
- Location: Colston Street, Bristol, England
- Coordinates: 51.4560°N 2.5973°W
- Construction started: 1861
- Completed: 1883

Website
- www.fostersalmshouses.co.uk

Listed Building – Grade II*
- Official name: Foster's Almshouses and attached walls, railings and gates
- Designated: 8 January 1959
- Reference no.: 1282306

Foster's Almshouses (grid reference ST586732) is a historic building on Colston Street in Bristol, England. The almshouse was founded by a bequest from the 15th-century merchant John Foster in 1492; his will can be read online.

== History ==
The west wing of the current building was built in 1861, the north wing in 1872, and the south and east wings in 1880–83 by Foster and Wood. The Chapel of the Three Kings of Cologne, which was built for the use of those living in the Almshouse, was restored at the same time.

It has been designated as a Grade II* listed building.

In 2007 Bristol Charities, which runs the almshouse, sold the existing buildings to a developer to develop into private accommodation. This decision was taken because the existing buildings were judged to be unfit for the purpose of housing the old and often infirm occupants who lived there. The proceeds of the sale have been used to establish a new purpose-built 'John Foster's Almshouse' in Henbury in north Bristol.

== Archives ==
Records of Foster's Almshouse are held at Bristol Archives (Ref. 33041/BMC/2) (online catalogue) and (Ref. 45157/1) (online catalogue).

== See also ==
- Grade II* listed buildings in Bristol
- List of British almshouses
