= Clevedon Pier =

Grade I listed pier in North Somerset, UK

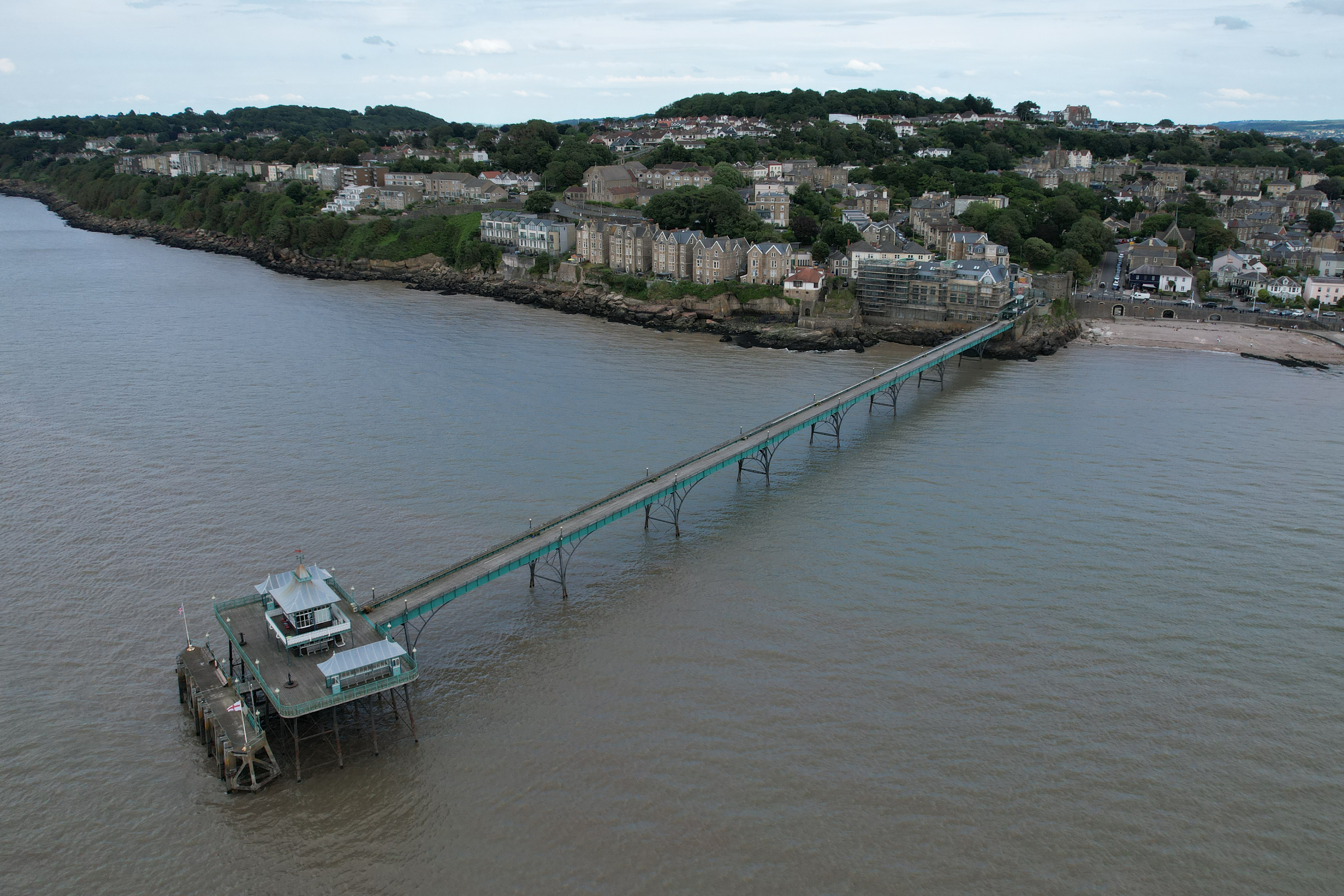
- The pier as of June 2026
- Type: Victorian Pleasure Pier
- Carries: Pedestrians
- Spans: Estuary of the River Severn
- Location: Somerset, England
- Coordinates: 51.4432°N 2.8632°W
- Owner: North Somerset Council
- Toll: Adults £6, Children (4-15yrs) £4, Family (2 adults + up to 3 children) £15.00. Children under 4 free.

Characteristics
- Longest span: Eight 30-metre (100 ft) arched spans
- Total length: 310 metres (1,020 ft)
- Width: 5.0 metres (16.5 ft)
- Clearance below: 4.3 metres (14 ft) (high water)

History
- Designer: Hans Price
- Opening date: 1869
- Listed: Grade I listed

Clevedon Pier is a seaside pier in the town of Clevedon, Somerset, England on the east shore of the Severn Estuary. It was described by Sir John Betjeman, as "the most beautiful pier in England" and was designated a Grade I listed building in 2001.

The pier was built during the 1860s to attract tourists and provide a ferry port for rail passengers to South Wales. The pier is 312 m (1,024 ft) long and consists of eight spans supported by steel rails covered by wooden decking, with a pavilion on the pier head.

The pier opened in 1869 and served as an embarkation point for paddle steamer excursions for almost 100 years. Two of the spans collapsed during stress testing in 1970 and demolition was proposed, but local fund raising and heritage grants allowed the pier to be dismantled for restoration and reassembled. It partially reopened in 1989 and then fully reopened in 1998. The next year it was named the Pier of the Year by the National Piers Society, also receiving a Civic Trust Award. The pier now offers a landing stage for steamers and is a popular attraction for tourists and anglers.

== Location ==
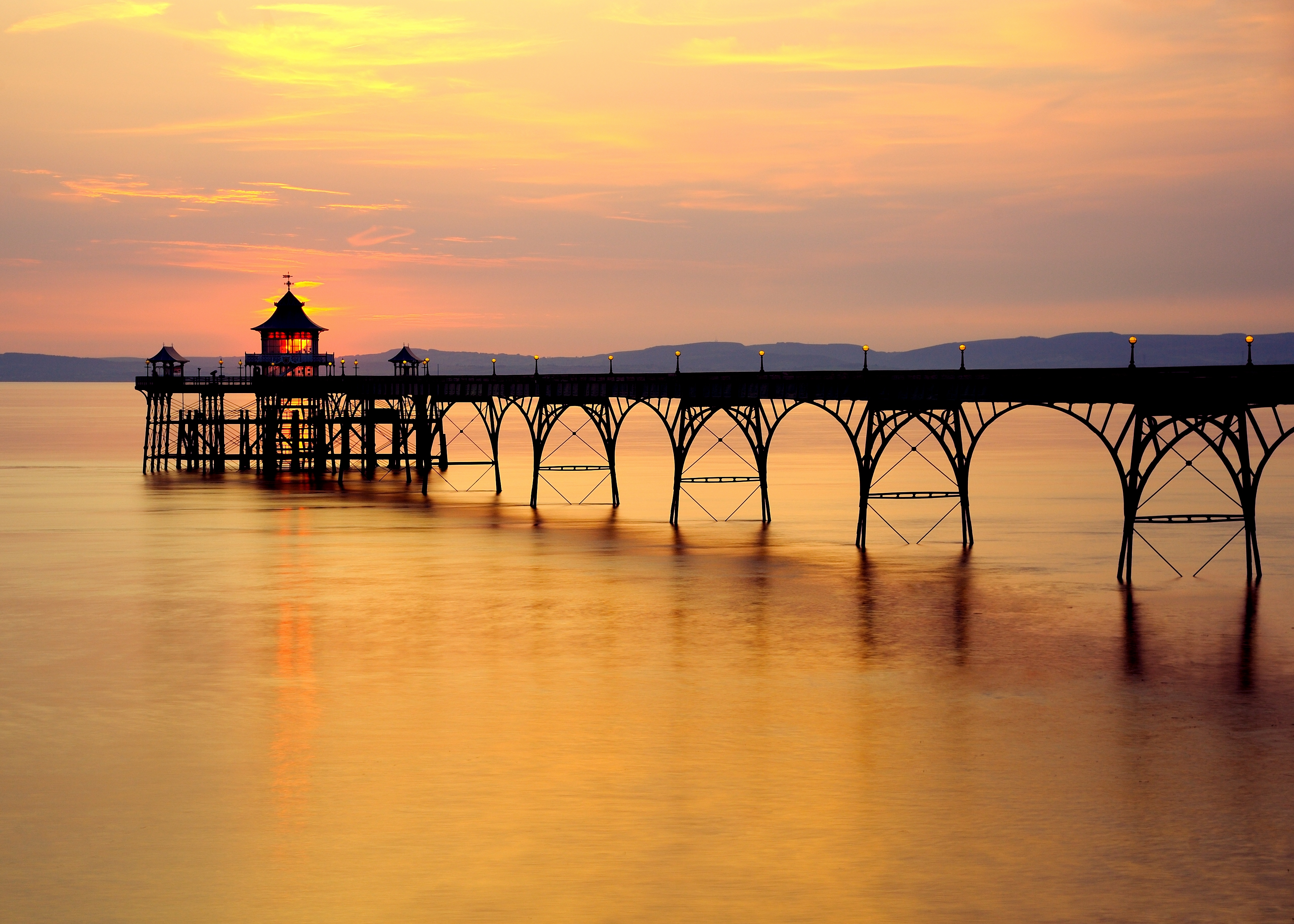
Clevedon Pier

The pier projects from the seafront at Clevedon into the Severn Estuary, which separates South West England from South Wales. The pier and toll house, where entry fees are collected, are adjacent to the Royal Pier Hotel, originally known as The Rock House and built in 1823 by Thomas Hollyman.

The shore at Clevedon is a mixture of pebbled beaches and low rocky cliffs, with the old harbour being at the western edge of the town at the mouth of the Land Yeo river. The rocky beach has been designated as the Clevedon Shore geological Site of Special Scientific Interest. It is the side of a mineralised fault, which runs east–west adjacent to the pier, and forms a small cliff feature in Dolomitic Conglomerate on the north side of Clevedon Beach, containing cream to pink baryte together with sulfides. The minerals identified at the site include: haematite, chalcopyrite, tennantite, galena, tetrahedrite, bornite, pyrite, marcasite, enargite and sphalerite. Secondary alteration of this assemblage has produced idaite, covellite and other copper sulfides. The nearest parking to the pier entrance is on an esplanade above the rocky beach.

== History ==
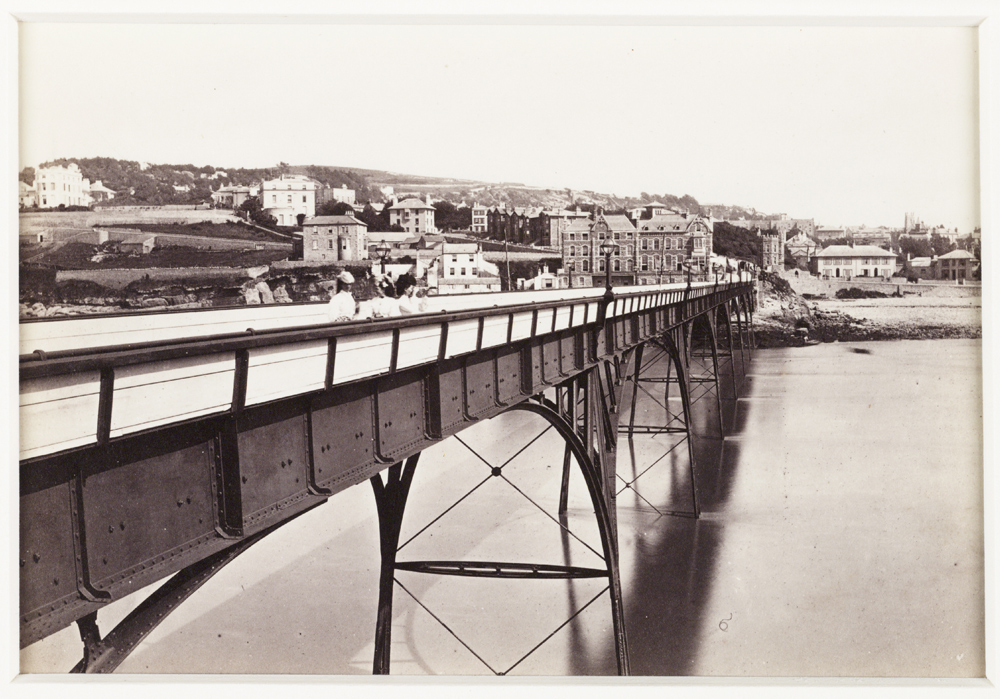
The pier circa 1880

=== Construction ===
During the Victorian era, Clevedon became a popular seaside town, having previously been an agricultural village. Due to improving transport links, via the Clevedon Branch Line, Clevedon was able to cater for the late 19th century craze for bathing in the sea with saltwater baths adjacent to the pier (since demolished, though the foundations can still be seen), and bathing machines on the main beach. Many English seaside resorts built piers in the 1850s to attract tourists. At Clevedon tourism grew following the opening of a branch line from Yatton railway station which connected it to the Bristol to Exeter line, enabling travel from the rest of the country. It was also proposed that a pier could form part of a route from London to South Wales with the use of steamers to cross the Severn Estuary. An enabling order, the Clevedon Pier Order 1864 was submitted to Parliament, and approved by the Pier and Harbour Orders Confirmation Act 1864 (27 & 28 Vict. c. 93).

In November 1866, the Clevedon Pier Company was formed at a public meeting in the town. The directors included Sir Arthur Elton of Clevedon Court. Construction of the pier started at a cost of £10,000, with John William Grover and Richard Ward as the engineers and Hans Price as the architect. The erection of the iron pillars was undertaken by Hamilton Windsor Ironworks Co. of Garston, Liverpool. The legs were constructed from Barlow rail which had previously been used on Isambard Kingdom Brunel's South Wales Railway, with wood planks for the decking. By August 1868 600 ft (183 m) of the pier had been built and the final section was completed by February 1869.

=== Opening and operation ===
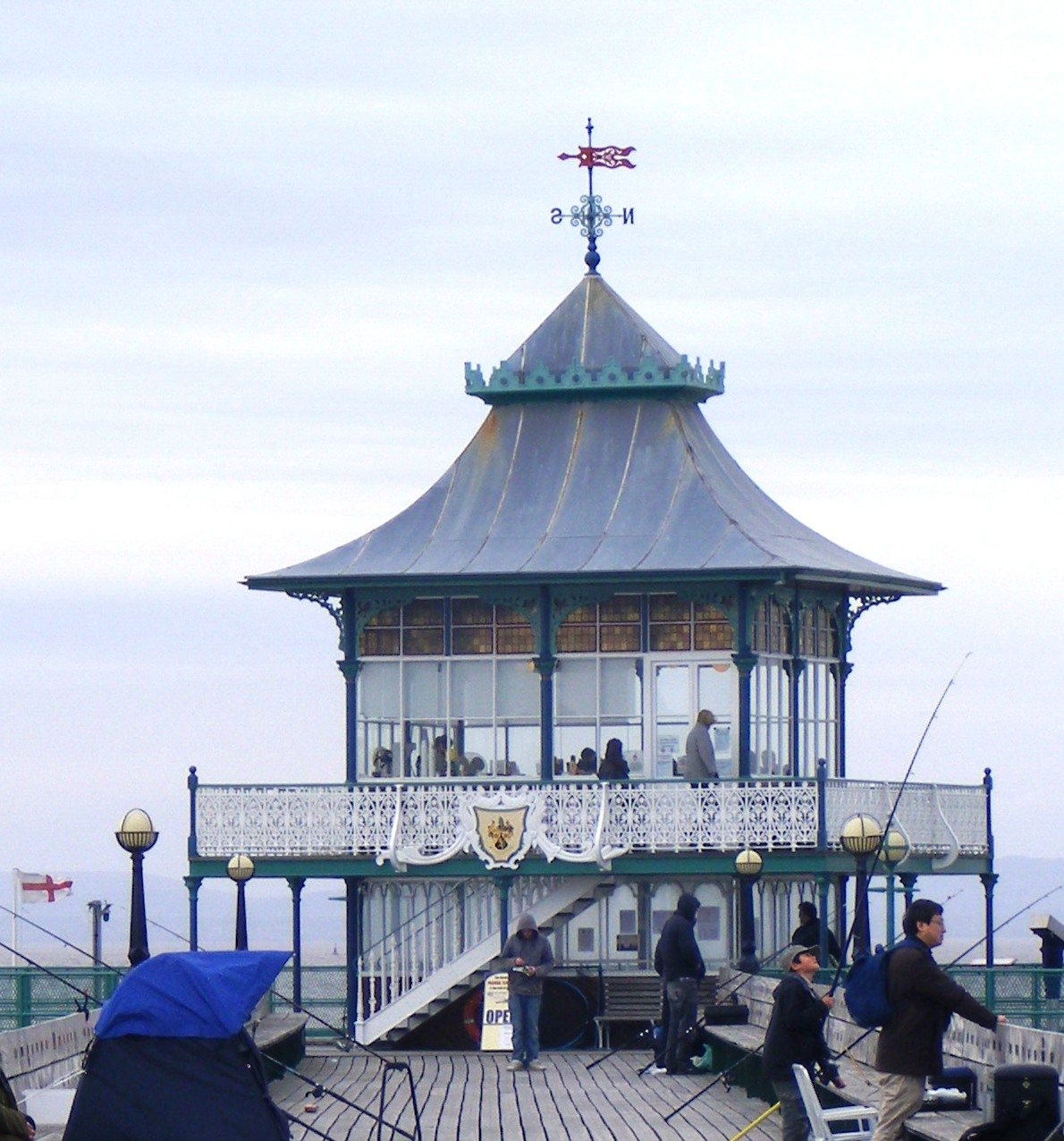
The pavilion on the pier head

The pier was officially opened on 29 March 1869, with a parade, bands and a cannon volley by the First Somerset Artillery.

The number of rail passengers crossing to South Wales, which had been envisaged, was reduced after the opening of the Severn Tunnel in 1886. The tunnel linked South Gloucestershire in the west of England to Monmouthshire in south Wales, under the estuary of the River Severn. The paddle steamer Waverley first visited the pier to take on passengers in 1886, and along with sister ships of the White Funnel Fleet belonging to P and A Campbell provided excursions around the Bristol Channel. Other ships of the fleet including Ravenswood, Westward Ho, Cambria and Britannia regularly called at Clevedon. Other companies, including the Cardiff-based Edwards, Robertson & Co., eventually taken over by Campbells, visited Clevedon Pier.

In 1891 the Clevedon Local Board acquired the pier from the Clevedon Pier Company under the Clevedon Local Board Act 1891 (54 & 55 Vict. c. cxxvii), which also gave powers to construct a new pier head.

In 1893 the pier head was replaced in cast iron with a new timber landing stage, and the pier head pavilion was completed in 1894. The Toll House on the pier and the adjacent Royal Pier Hotel were both designed by local architect Hans Price. In 1899, 20 ft (6 m) of the decking was washed away by a storm, and in 1910, part of the landing stage was damaged in another storm and replaced by a concrete landing stage in 1913.

The pier continued to flourish between the First and Second World Wars and into the 1960s, and was visited frequently by P&A Campbell's steamers. The PS Bristol Queen (1946) and PS Cardiff Queen (1947) were regular visitors.

=== Collapse ===
On 16 October 1970, spans 7 and 8 of the pier collapsed during stress testing, which had been introduced in the 1950s as a requirement for obtaining insurance cover. The tests involved the placement of polythene tanks 50 ft (15.2 m) long, 5 ft (1.5 m) wide and 2 ft (0.6 m) deep filled to a depth of 10 in (25.4 cm), which created a pressure of 50 psf (2 kPa). This simulated the required load agreed with the Ministry of Transport.

Six tanks were used for each span and left in place for three hours; the 18 tanks used in total allowed three spans to be tested simultaneously. At the end of the three hours the tanks were emptied and dragged along the deck to test further spans. The first six spans passed without problems, but under load the seventh span collapsed, bringing down the eighth and final span, leaving the pier head and pavilion standing.

=== Restoration ===
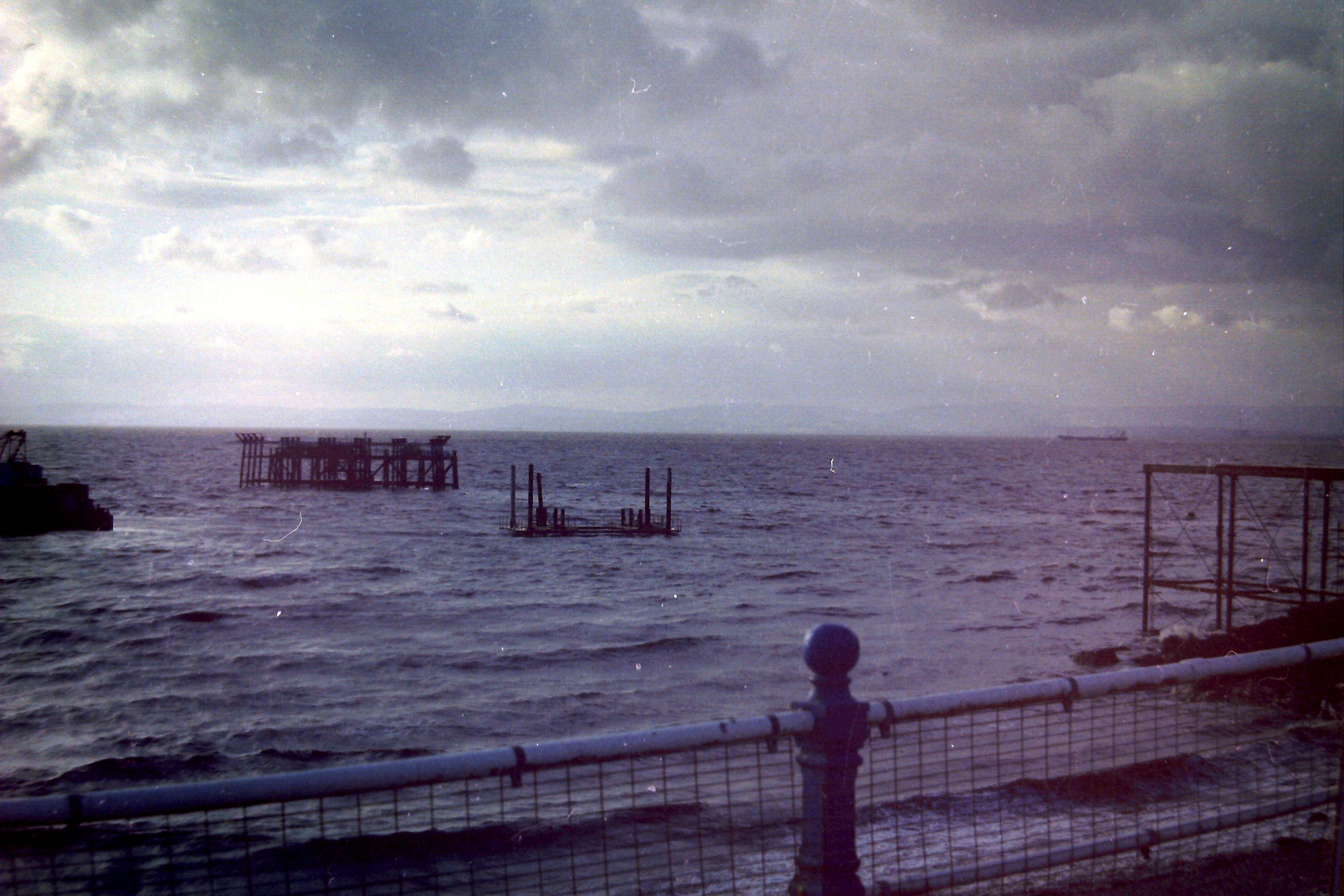
The pier following being dismantled in 1985

The Clevedon Pier Preservation Society was formed in 1972 and started campaigning for the restoration of the pier. The district council applied for permission to demolish the pier in 1979, but a public enquiry the following year ruled that it should be retained. The pavilions from the end of the pier were taken ashore in 1982 for storage in anticipation of eventual restoration; insufficient funds were available to complete restoration and the first stage was to open the Toll House as an exhibition centre in 1984.

A major breakthrough came in 1984, when English Heritage and the National Heritage Memorial Fund granted a million pounds towards the restoration, with smaller sums from Woodspring District Council and other funding bodies. The trust, which had been formed by the preservation society, also obtained a 99-year lease. The pier was dismantled in 1985, taken to Portishead dock for restoration, and reconstructed in 1986.

After a long campaign by local people to raise funds for restoration (supported by Sir John Betjeman, who described Clevedon as "the most beautiful pier in England", the pier eventually reopened. Some funds were raised by "sponsored planks" – small brass plaques with names or messages are inlaid on the wooden planks and benches, recording donations. Reconstruction of the pier spans and decking was completed on 27 May 1989, and the pier was reopened to great enthusiasm. The pierhead was still shut, however, and it was not until 23 May 1998 that it was finally restored and opened to the public, as a result of funding from the Heritage Lottery Fund. In 1999 the National Piers Society awarded Clevedon Pier the title of Pier of the Year, and it also won a Civic Trust Award. The pier was re-designated a Grade I listed building in 2001, the only other pier with this status being Brighton's West Pier (largely destroyed by fire and storms between 2002 and 2004).

The landing stage at the end of the pier is used throughout the summer season (June to September) by the Waverley and her sister ship, the Balmoral, and is a popular spot for angling. There is a cafe at the pierhead, and a souvenir shop at the toll house. The upper floor of the toll house is an art gallery with a different exhibition every month. The pier is open every day of the year except Christmas Day. Scenes from the 2010 film, Never Let Me Go, starring Keira Knightley were filmed near Clevedon pier during 2009, and the pier also featured on the promotional posters. One Direction's music video for their single "You & I" was filmed on Clevedon Pier. An appeal was launched in 2012 to raise £1.6 million for a new visitor centre and educational facility, an additional £800,000 of grants have been applied for to cover the cost of repainting the legs of the structure. In December 2012 it was announced that the pier had received £720,000 of funding from the Heritage Lottery Fund to improve the visitor centre.

In October 2024, following the death of One Direction singer Liam Payne, the pier became a vigil site, with fans arriving to lay flowers at the One Direction plaque, which was installed to commemorate the filming of the music video, in Payne's memory. The pier's management also issued a statement of condolence. In January 2025, a plaque was installed on the pier in Payne's memory.

== Engineering ==
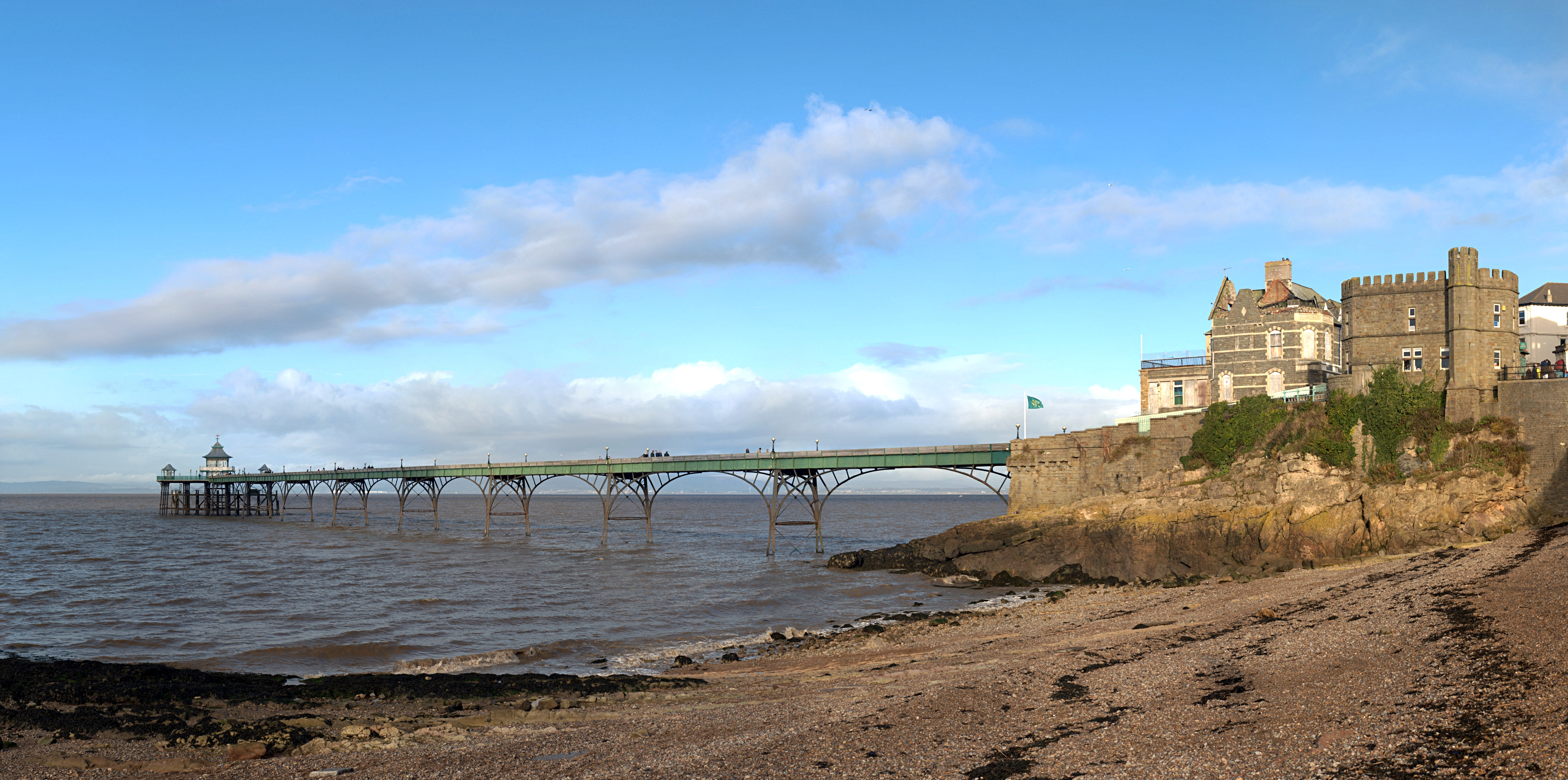
The pier is next to the Royal Pier Hotel; the beach in front is a site of special scientific interest

The pier is 312 m (1,024 ft) long and 48 ft (15 m) above high water. Each of the eight spans is 100 ft (30 m) long. The legs are made up of Barlow rails which are riveted together; one of the rails separates from the main support close to the deck at the top, forming a transverse truss joining a rail from the opposite leg of the pier and longitudinal bracing is provided by further rails. The supporting piles, which are made of cast iron, are 2 ft (0.6 m) in diameter at the seabed. In total approximately 370 tons of wrought iron was used.

The Severn Estuary has one of the highest tidal ranges in the world, up to 48 ft (15 m), second only to the Bay of Fundy in Eastern Canada. The estuary's funnel shape, its tidal range, and the underlying geology of rock, gravel and sand, produce strong tidal streams and high turbidity, giving the water a notably brown colouration. The tidal range means that the legs of the pier are largely exposed at low tide and hidden at high tide and the landing stage at the end of the pier has several levels to allow boats to dock at all stages of the tide.

== Photo gallery ==
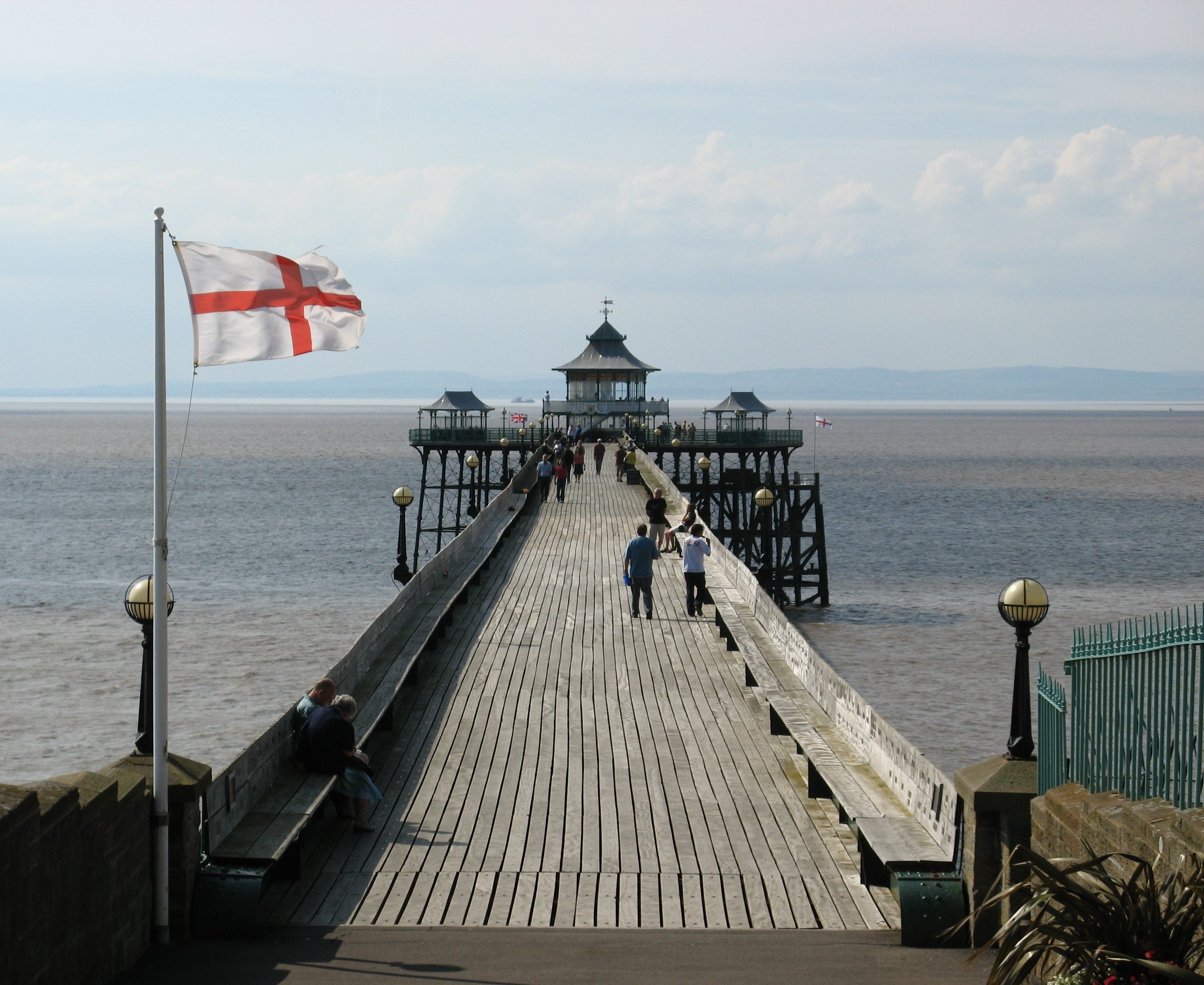
Pier from toll house, showing replaced boards and side seating

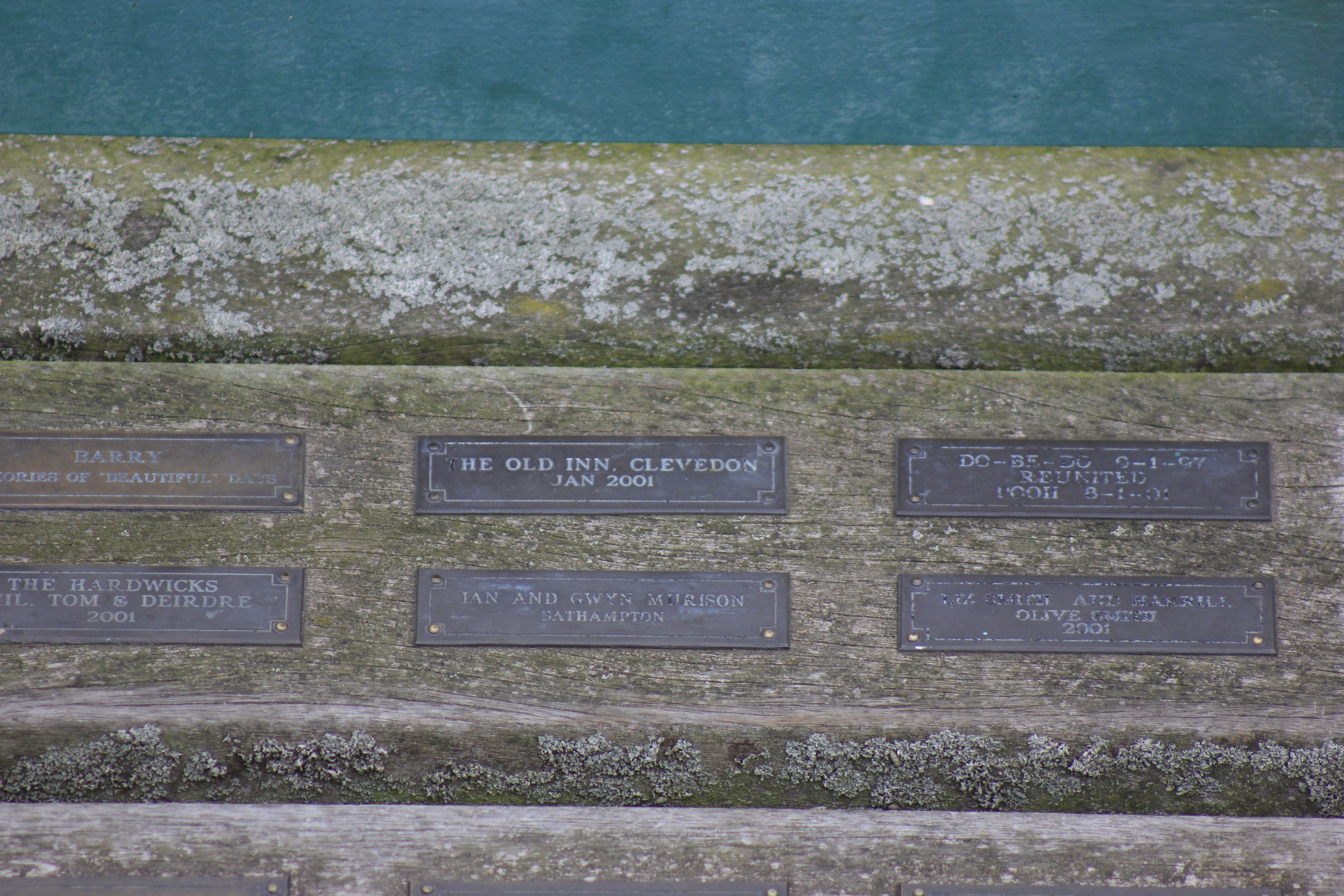
Name Plates, Clevedon Pier, Clevedon, England.

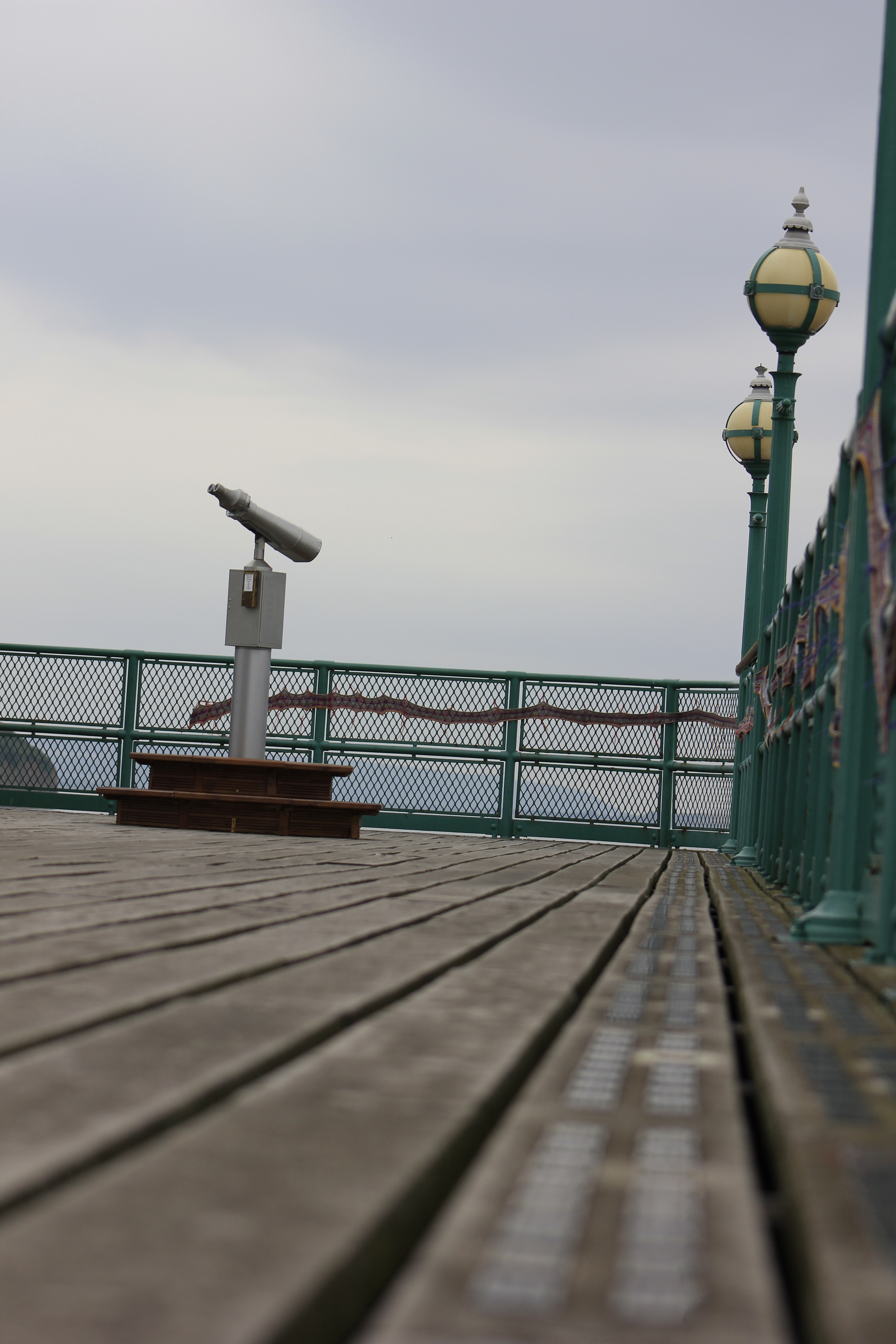
Name Plates, Clevedon Pier floor name plates.

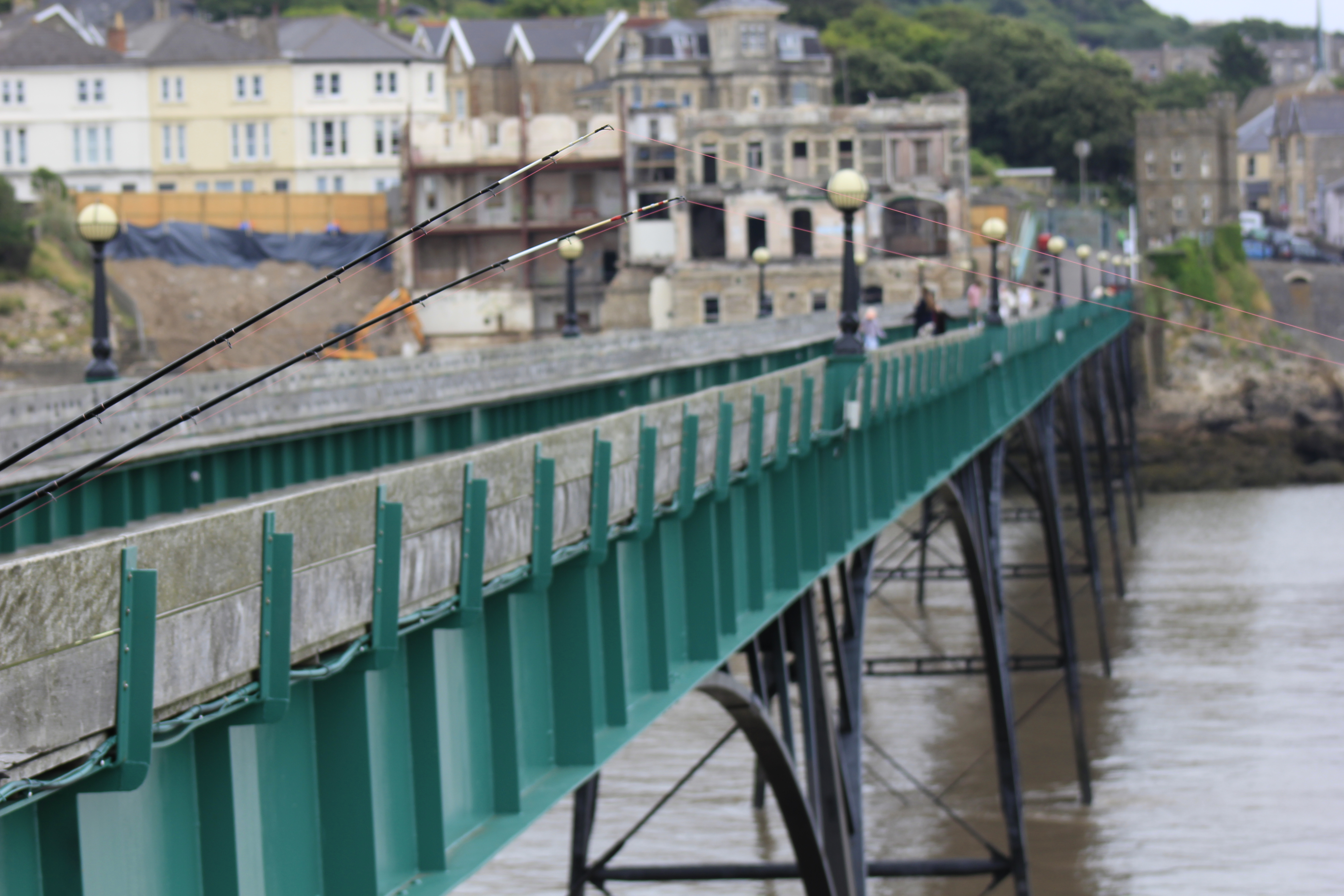
View of support structure from end of Pier.

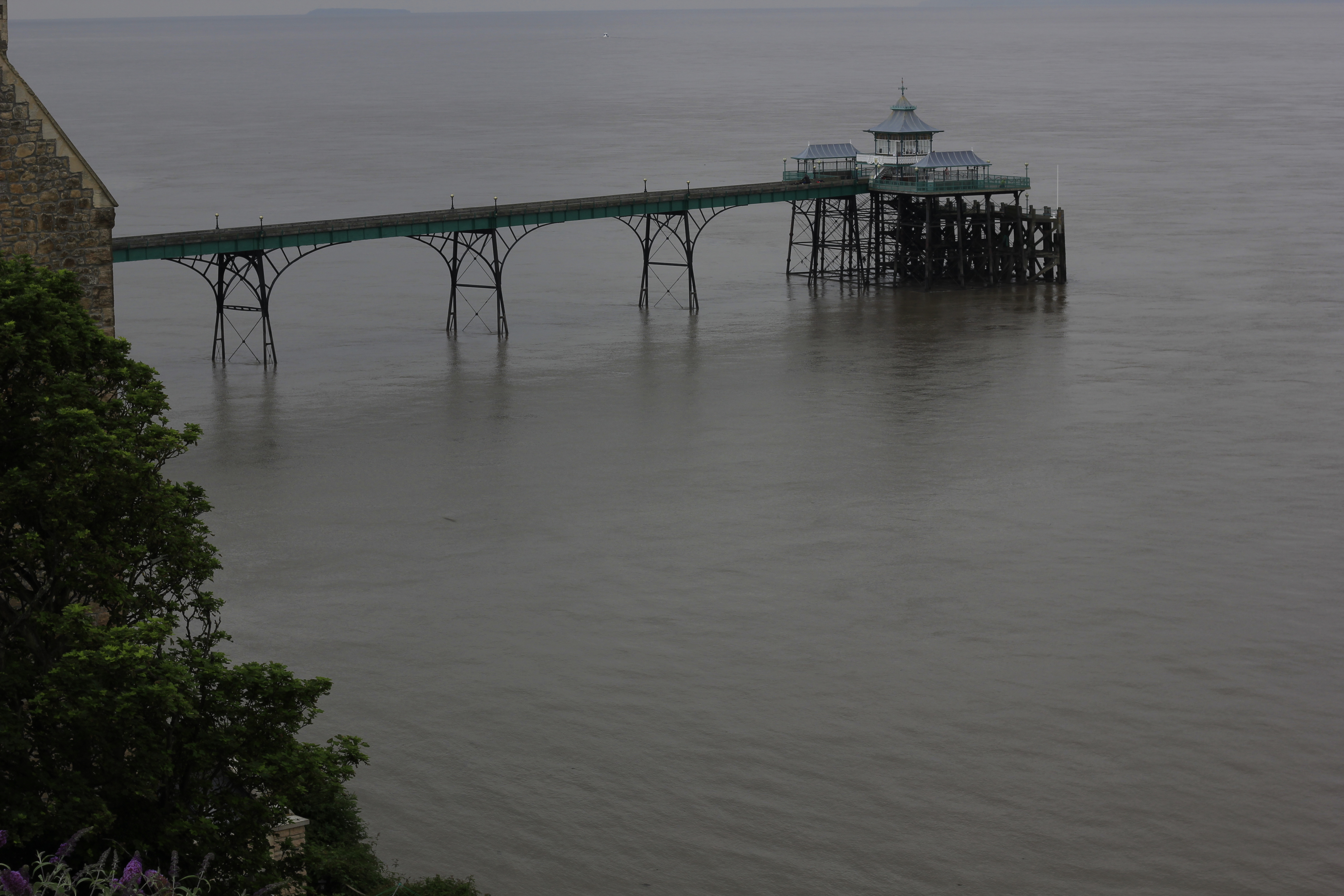
High tide view of Clevedon Pier.

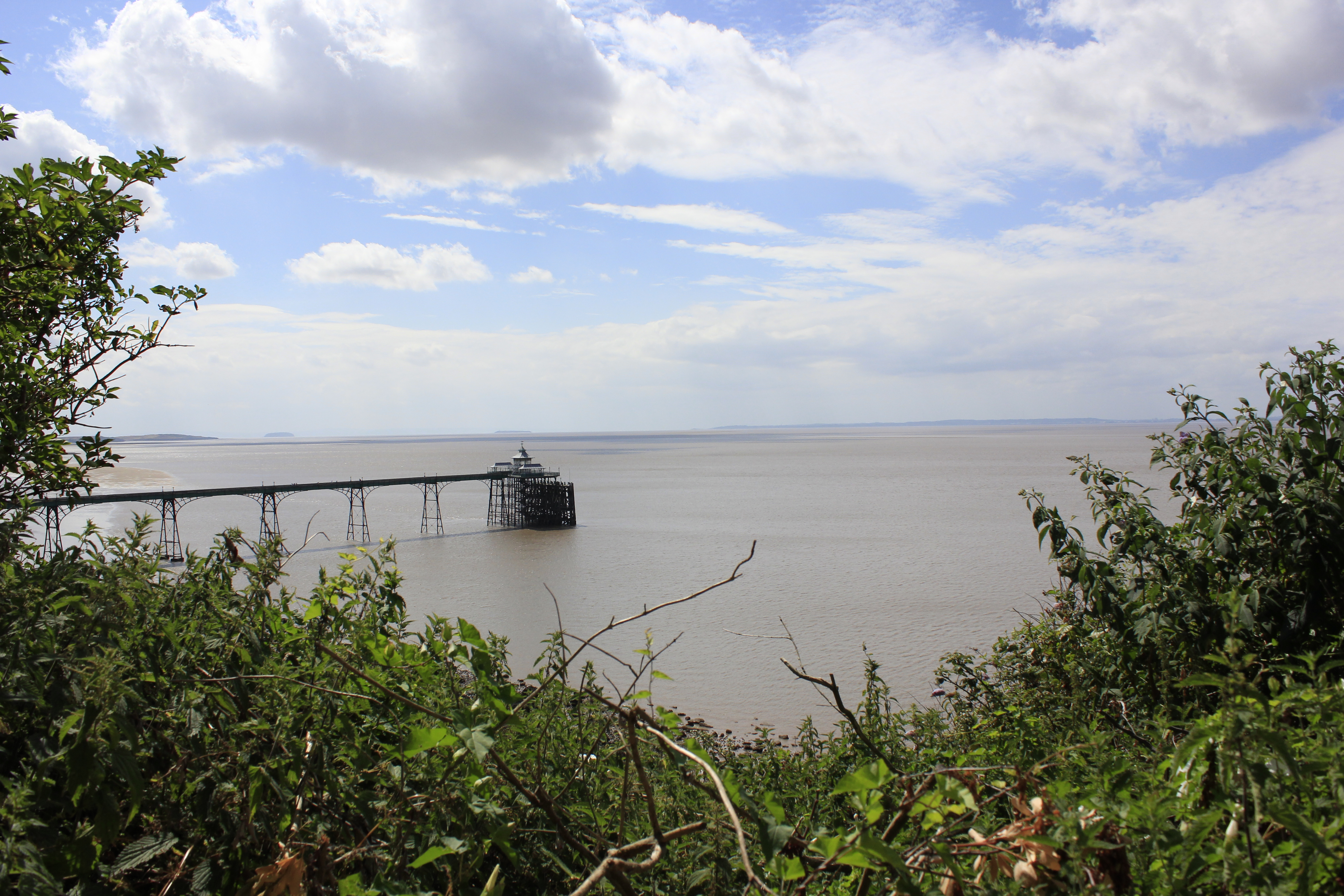
View of the pier from Coast Road.

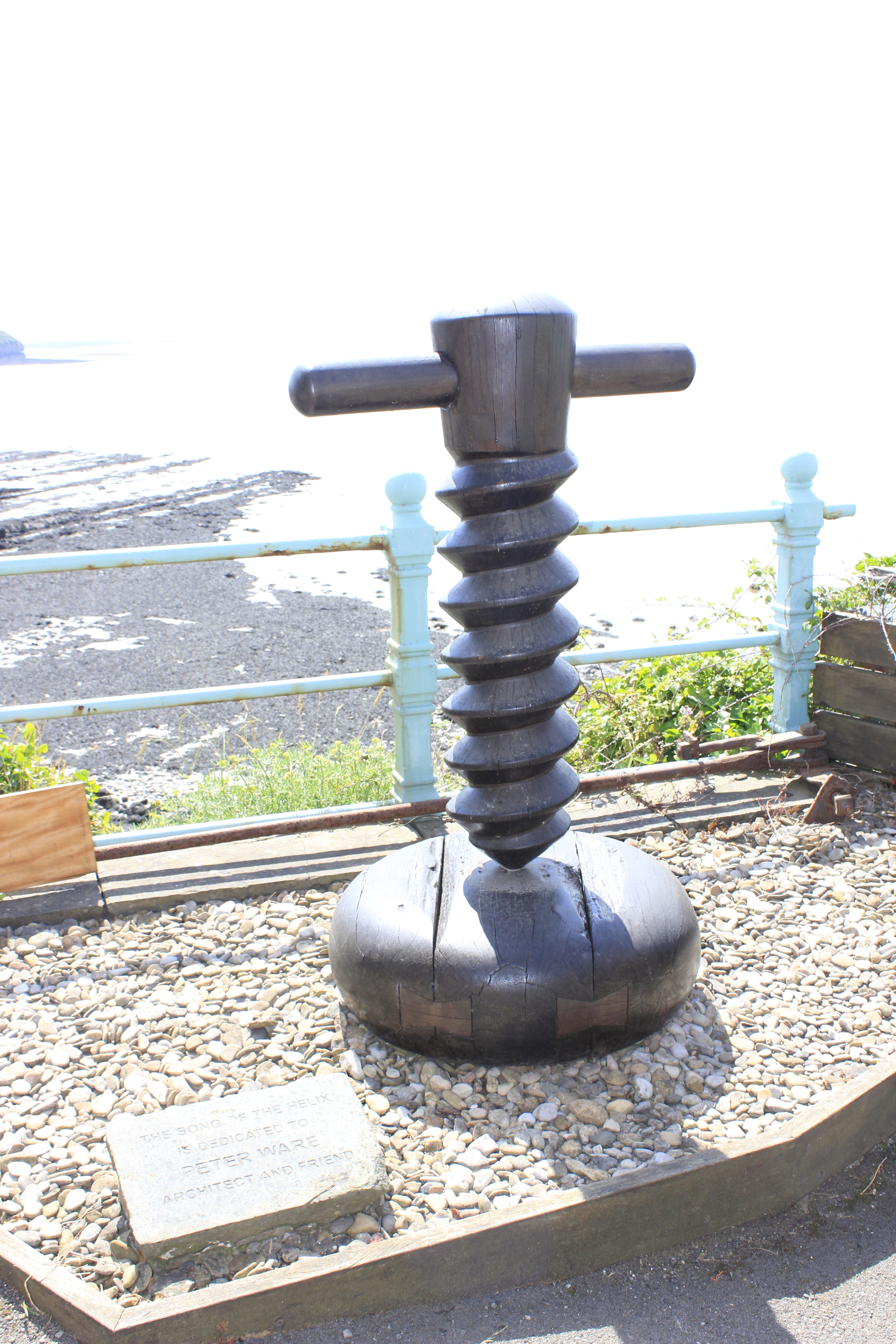
Sculpture that stood at the pier tollhouse.

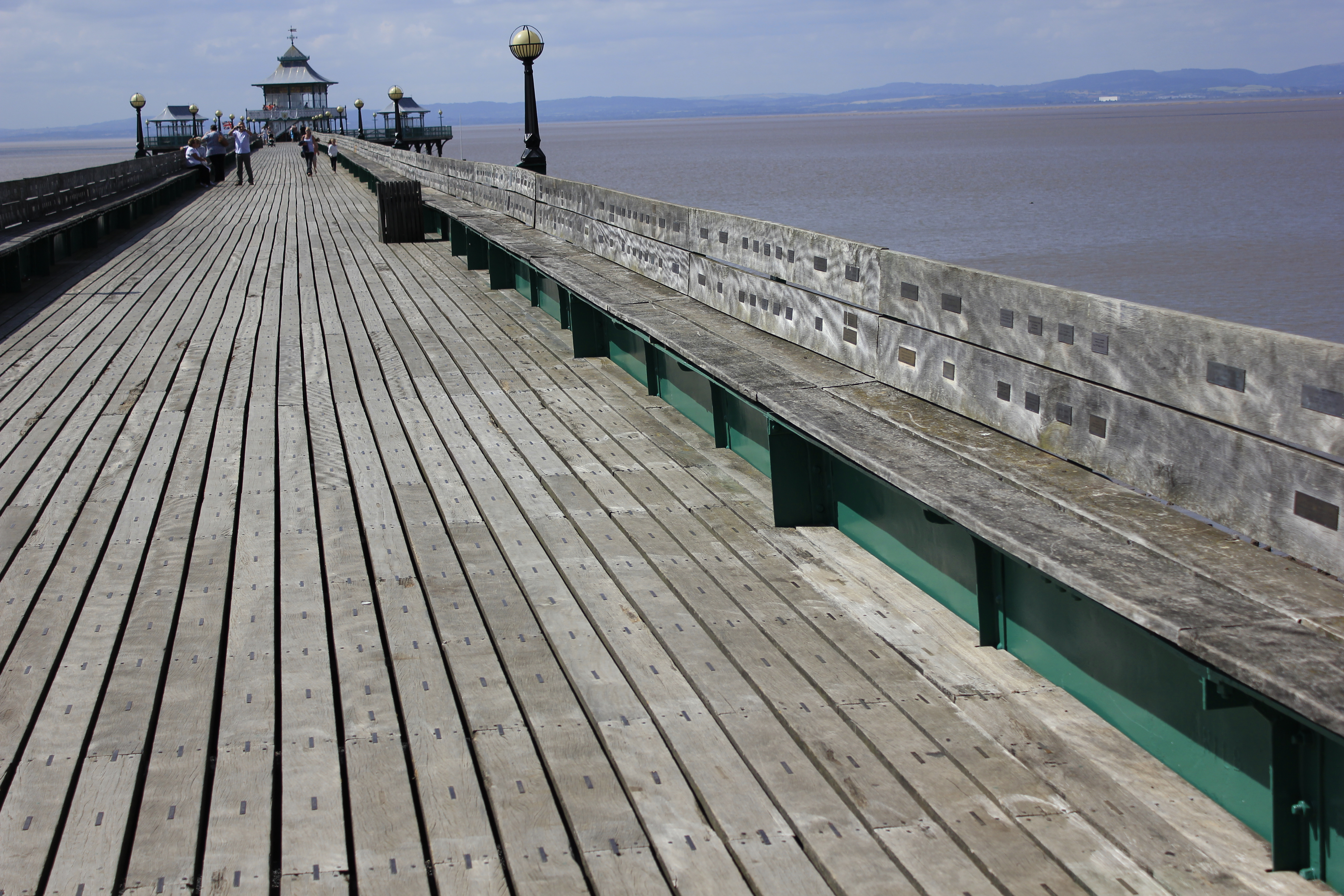
Gangway showing the nameplates along the length and breadth of the pier.

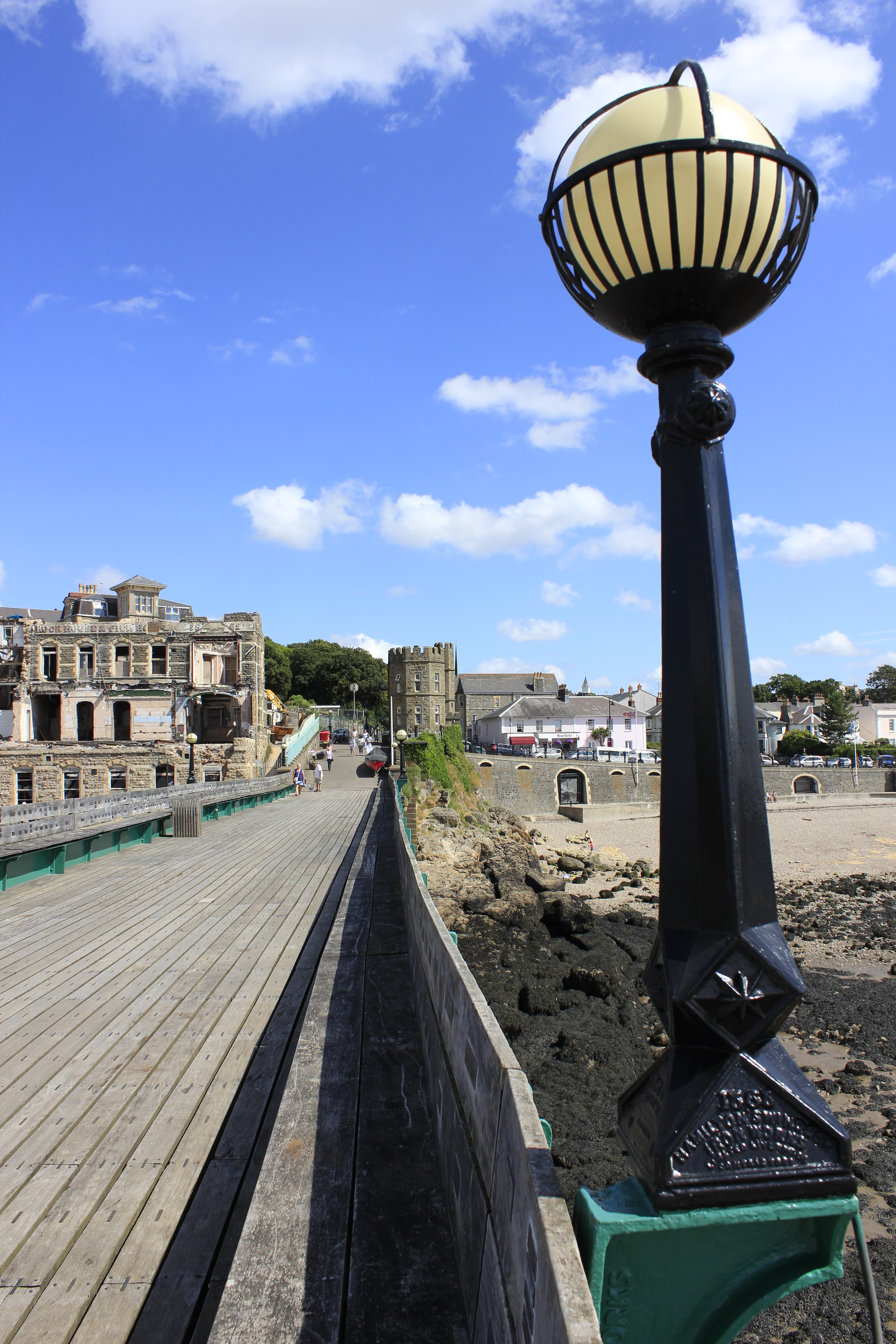
Original cast iron lamp.

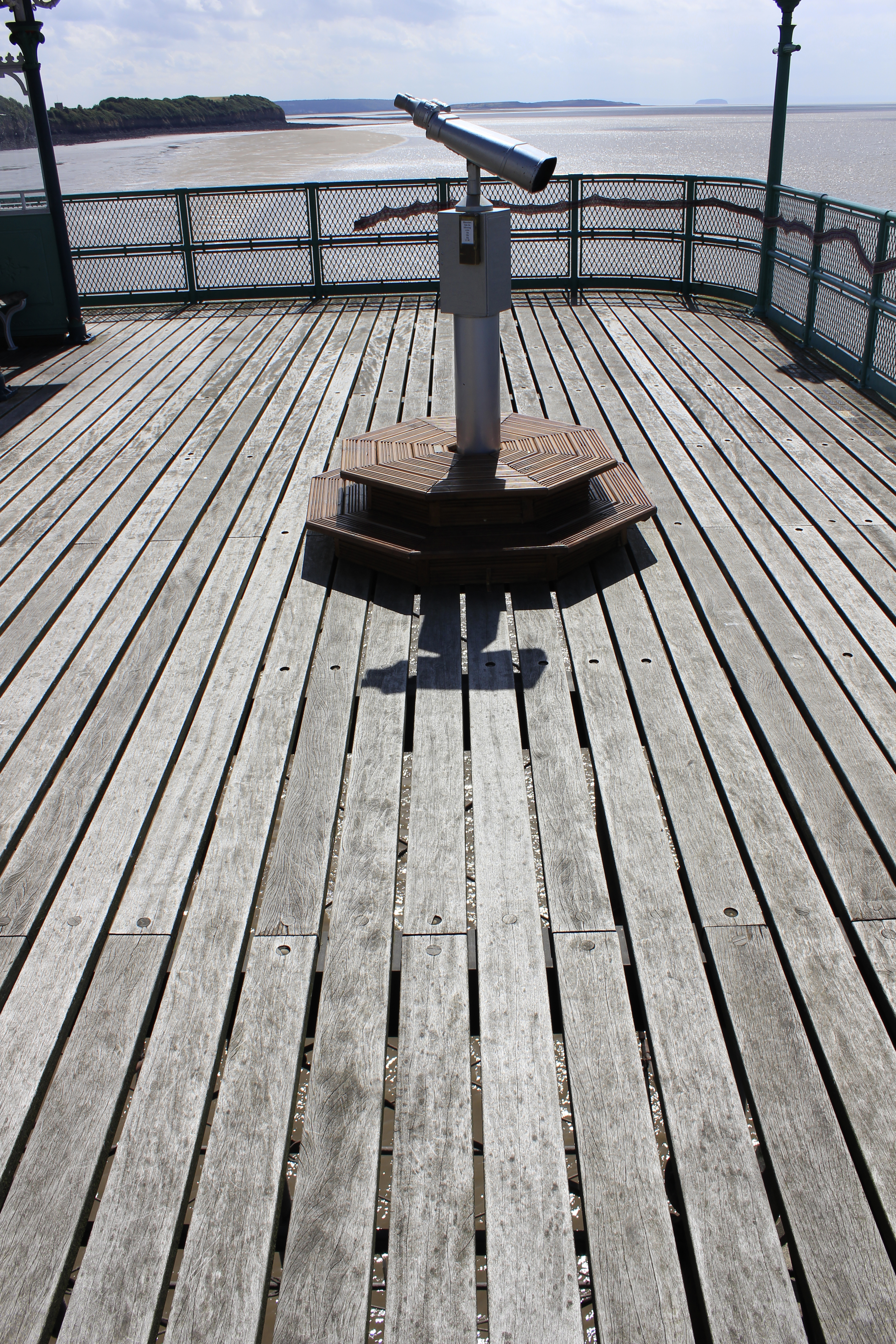
The pay to use telescope showing the name plates on the floorboards.

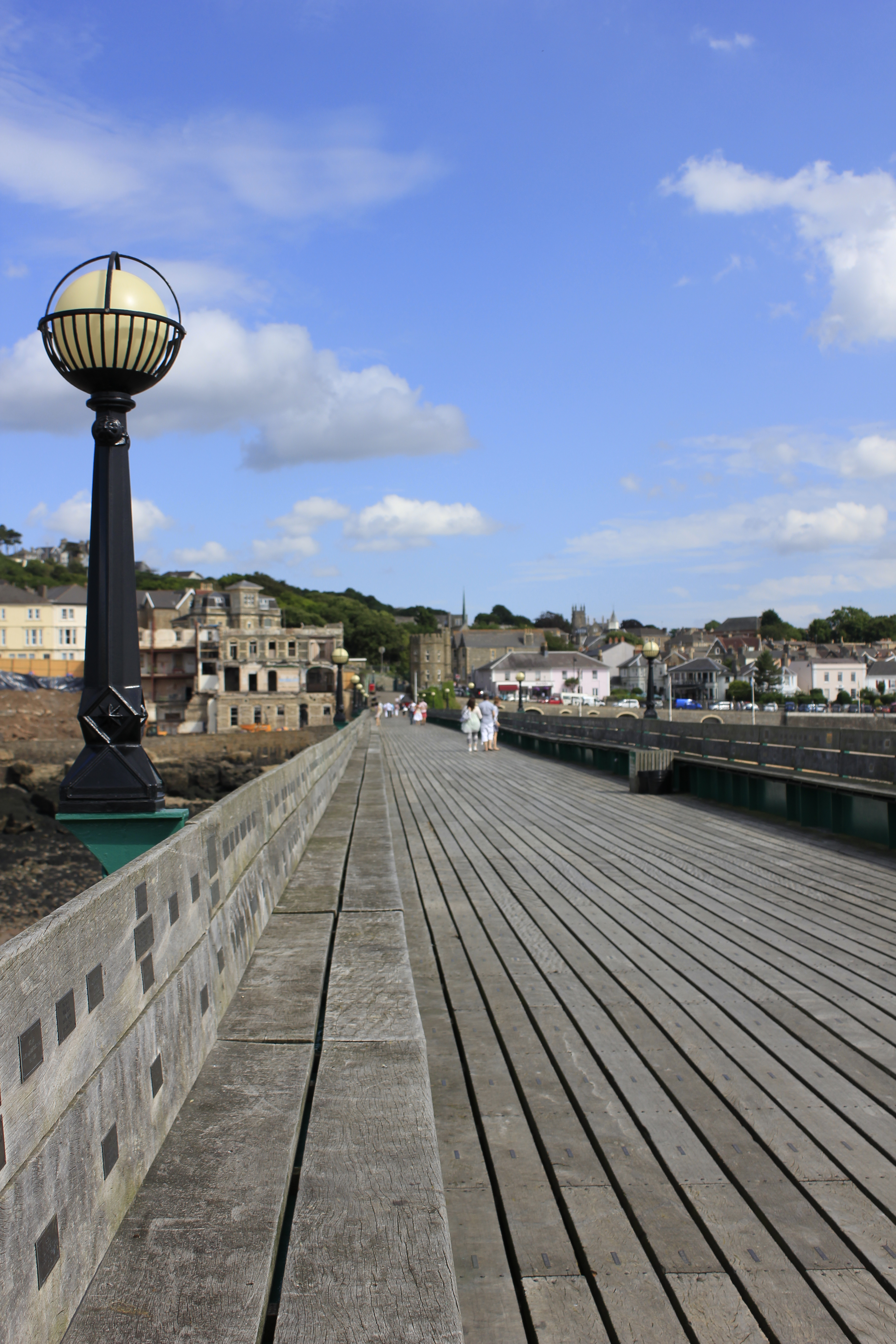
View of the tollhouse and Royal Hotel from end of the pier.

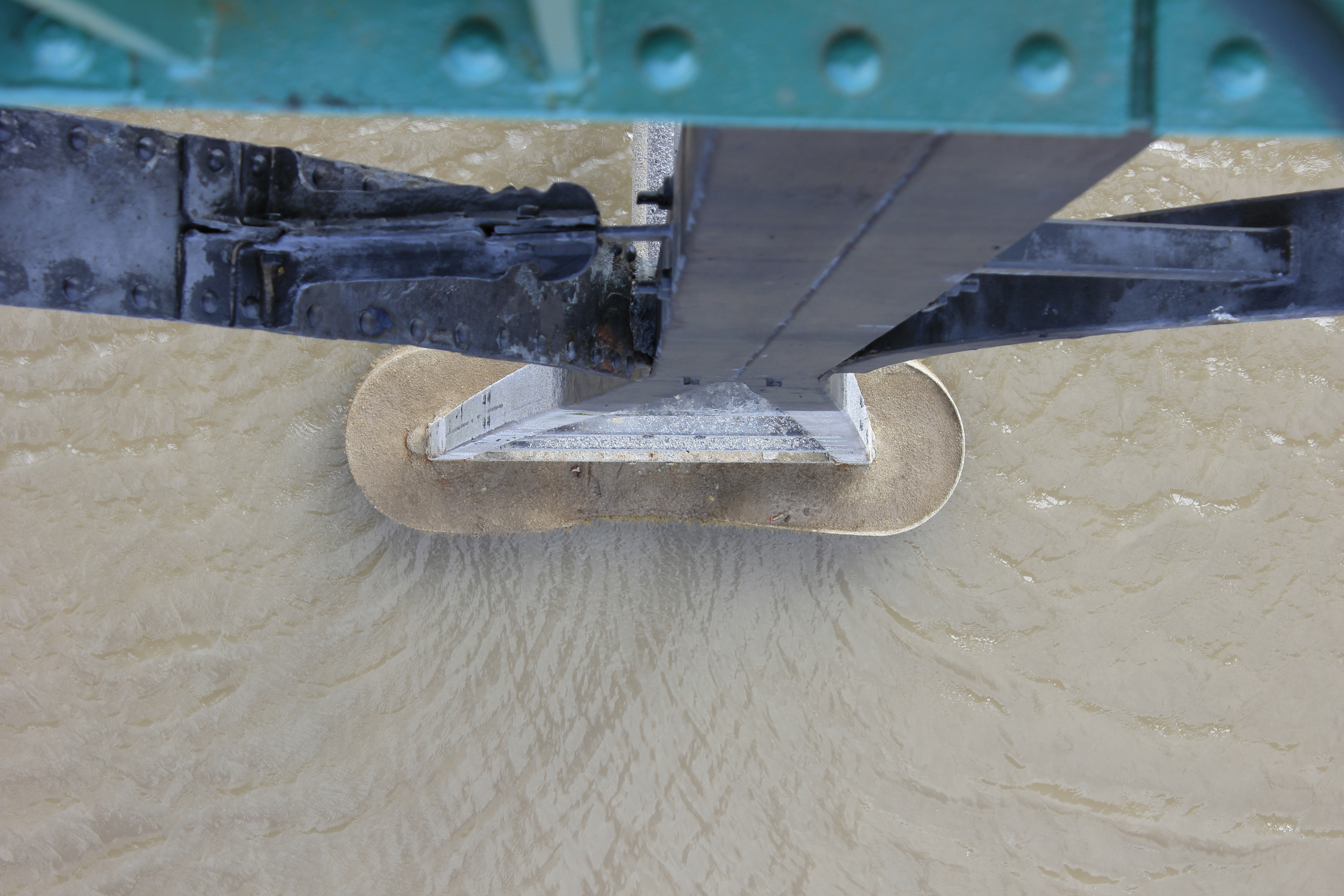
One of the support legs at low tide

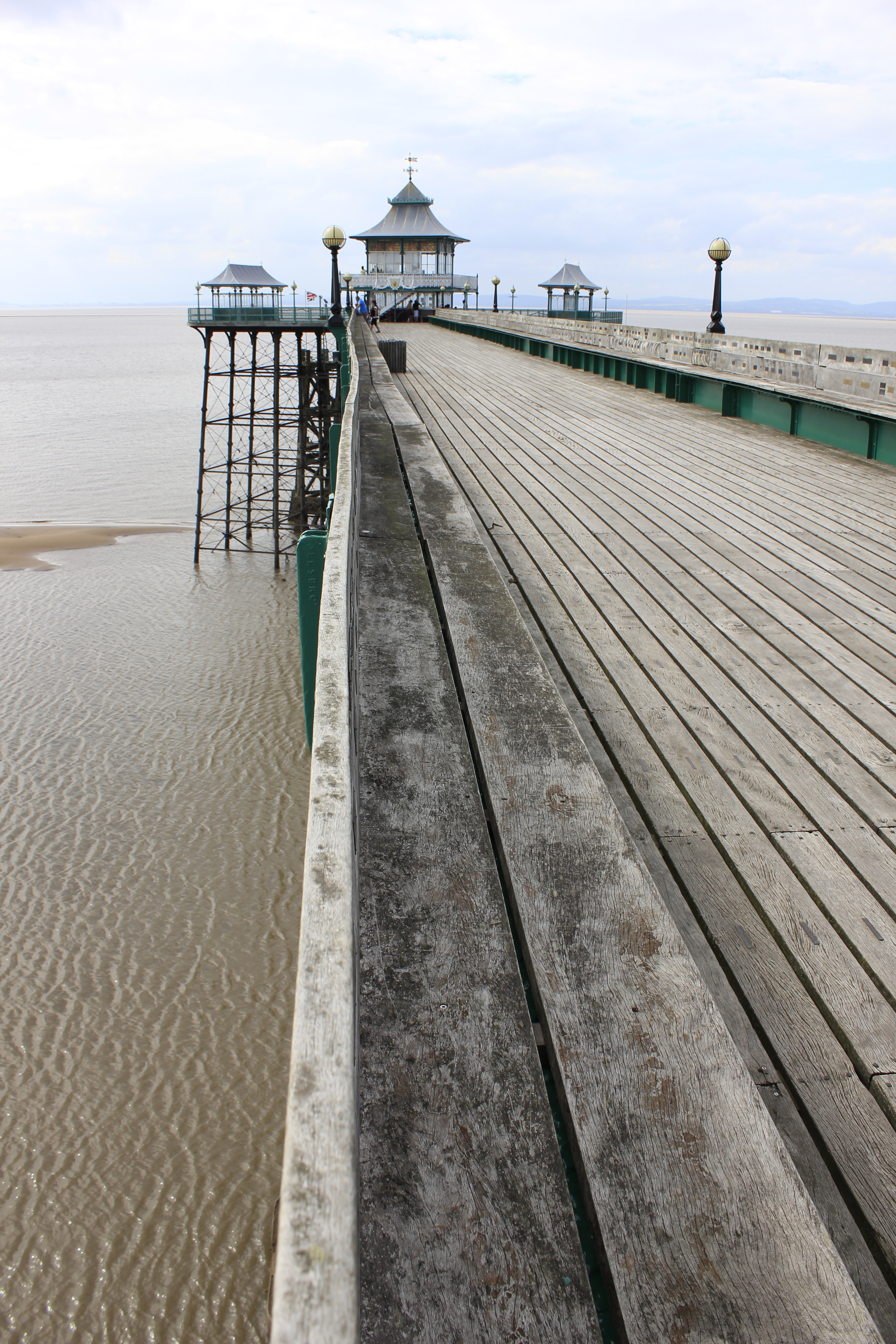
South side view of the pier at low tide.

== See also ==
- List of piers
- List of piers in the United Kingdom
- Grade I listed buildings in North Somerset

== Notes ==
Awards and achievements
| Preceded by Clacton Pier | National Piers Society; Pier of the Year; 2021 | Succeeded by Garth Pier |
| Preceded by Swanage Pier | National Piers Society; Pier of the Year; 2013 | Succeeded by Penarth Pier |
| Preceded by Brighton Palace Pier | National Piers Society; Pier of the Year; 1999 | Succeeded by Cromer Pier |
