= Penarth Pier =

Pier in Penarth, South Wales

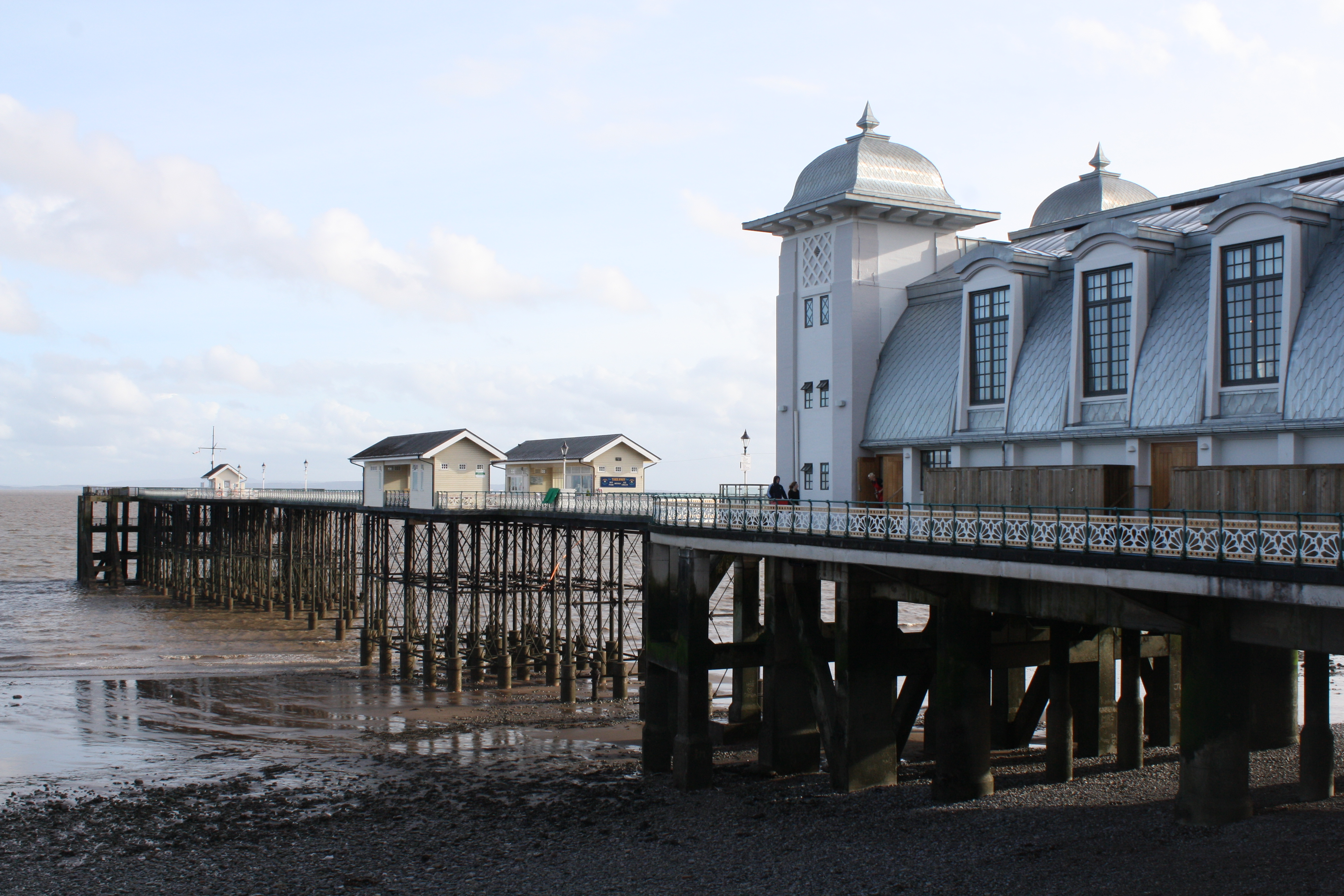
- The pier pavilion
- Type: Cast iron screw piers, cast iron supports, wooden deck
- Carries: Pedestrians
- Spans: Bristol Channel
- Location: Penarth, Vale of Glamorgan, South Wales
- Coordinates: 51°26′6.31″N 3°9′59.43″W
- Owner: Vale of Glamorgan Council

Characteristics
- Total length: As built:750 feet (230 m); Present: 650 feet (200 m)
- None

History
- Designer: H. F. Edwards
- Constructor: Mayohs Brothers
- Opening date: February 1895; 131 years ago

Penarth Pier is a Victorian era pier in the town of Penarth, Vale of Glamorgan, South Wales. The pier was opened in 1898 and was a popular attraction to seaside-goers at the time, who also enjoyed trips on pleasure steamers that operated from the pier. It has on several occasions been damaged by vessels colliding with the structure and in 1931, a fire broke out in one of the pavilions. This wooden pavilion was never replaced, but a concrete pavilion has been used over the years as a concert hall, ballroom, cinema and for other purposes. It is currently home to the Penarth Pier Pavilion.

== Background ==
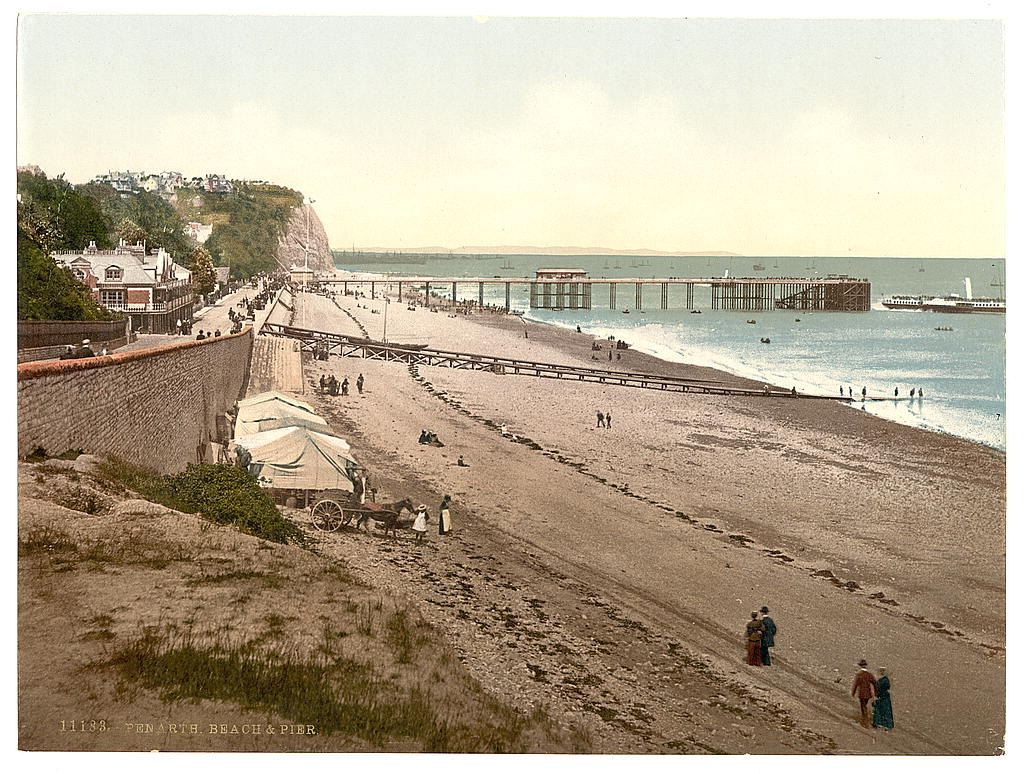
Penarth Pier in about 1900.

The growing popularity of Penarth beach and the need for better communications with Cardiff led to the Cardiff Steam and Navigation Company starting a regular ferry service between Cardiff and Penarth in 1856, which continued until 1903. Boats were loaded and unloaded at Penarth using a landing stage on wheels which was hauled up the beach.

In the 1880s an attempt was made to construct a permanent pier, because of the need to find a safer way to unload larger boats. However, construction ground to a halt at an early stage when the London-based contractors went into liquidation.

== Construction ==
As a result, the Penarth Promenade and Landing Company Ltd was formed, to make a second attempt at building a permanent pier. The pier was authorised by the Penarth Promenade and Pier Order 1892, and designed by H. F. Edwards. Construction of the cast iron screw piers, cast iron supports and wooden deck was begun by Mayohs Brothers in 1894. The pier successfully opened in 1895, 750 feet (230 m) long.

== History ==
The rear of the Pier Pavilion

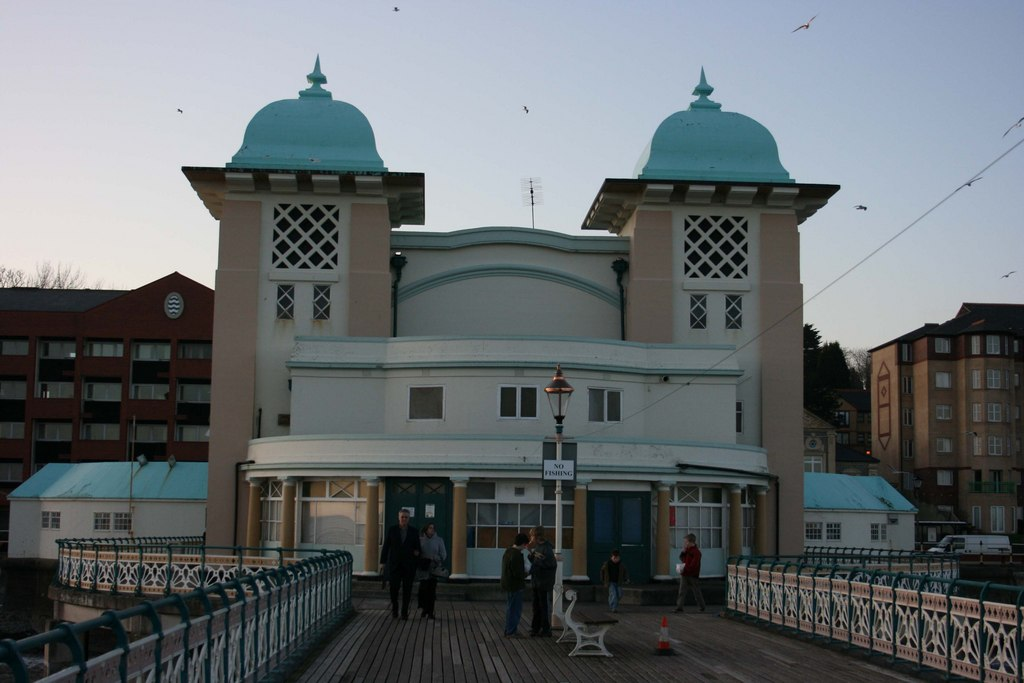
The Pavilion in 2009

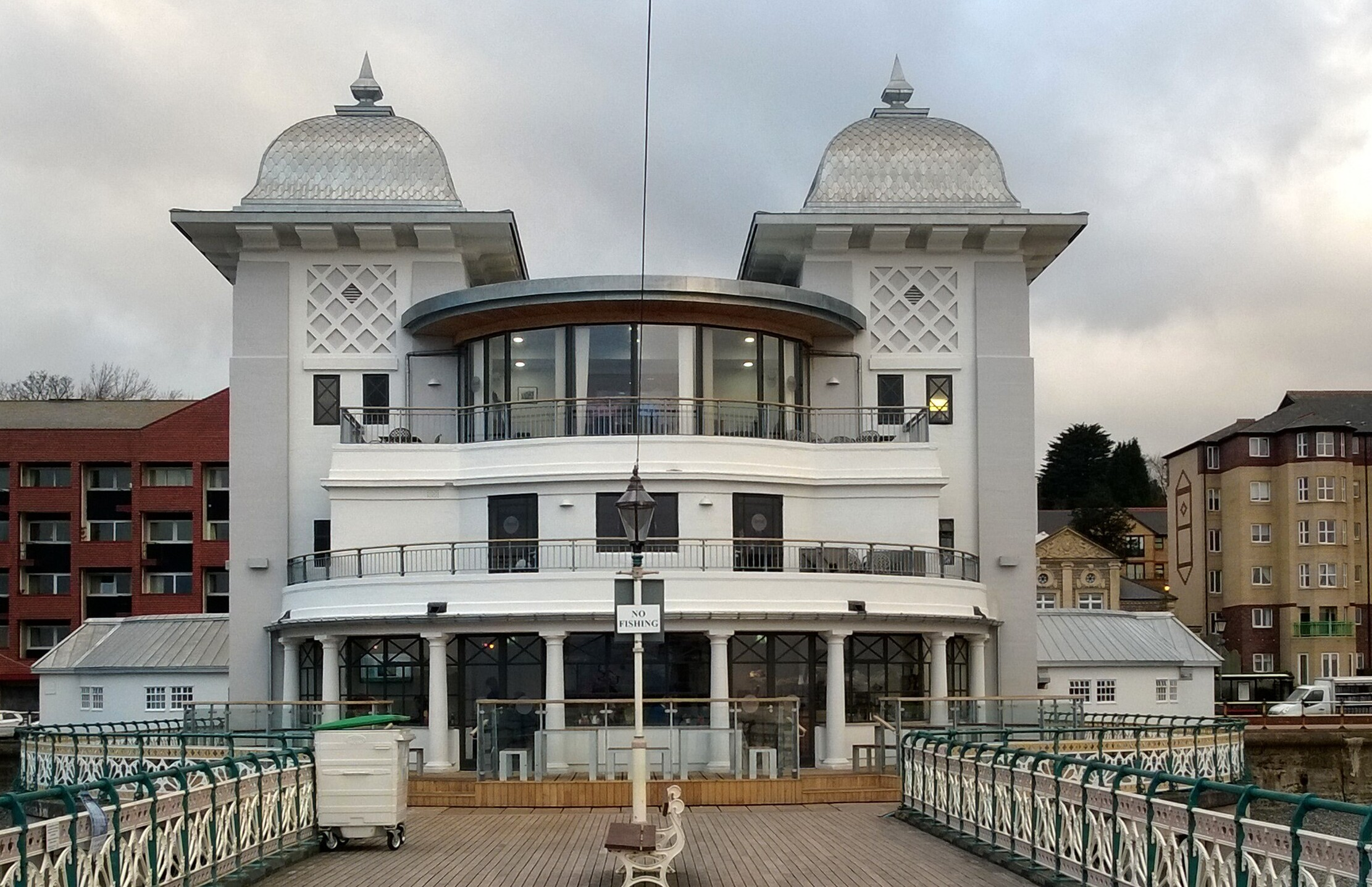
The Pavilion in 2013

The pier was opened in 1898, having been constructed by James & Arthur Mayoh, assisted by Herbert Francis Edwards, a local engineer. The pier, at 658 ft (200 m), was rather short; it was not permitted to be longer for fear of obstructing the deep water channel into Cardiff Docks. It was built of cast iron with a timber decking, and acted both as a promenade, and as a landing jetty for steam ships trading in the Bristol Channel. The pier was an immediate success, chiefly because the cruises, provided by the pleasure steamers that used the pier’s landing stage, proved very popular with the public. In 1907, a small wooden "Concert Party" theatre was built at the far end of the pier.

During World War I, the pleasure steamers were used as minesweepers and the pier was requisitioned by the army. After the war, it was found that the landing stage was considerably damaged, and compensation payments were inadequate to fund the necessary repairs. The pier went into a period of decline, and in 1929, it was sold to Penarth Borough Council using powers in the Penarth Pier Order 1924. As a result, a new concrete landing stage was built at the seaward end, and in 1930, a spectacular Art Deco pavilion, built of ferro-concrete, was constructed at the shoreward end.

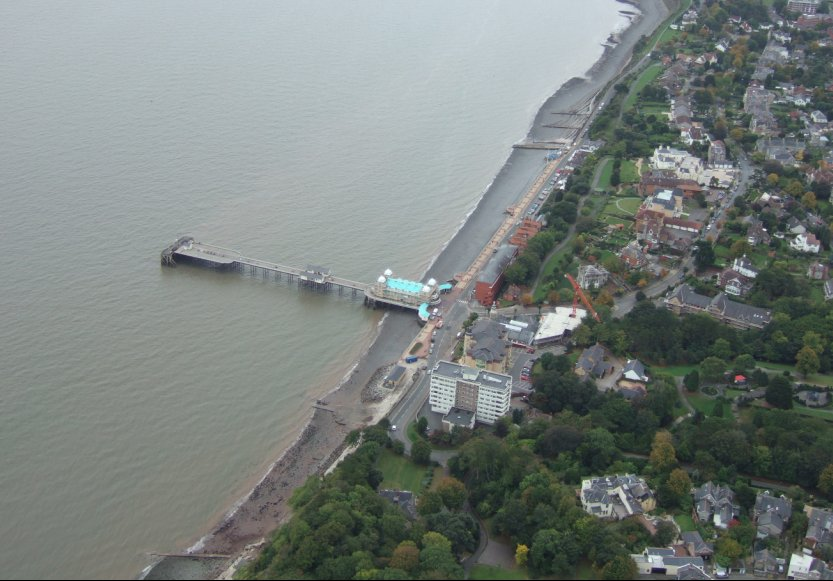
An aerial photograph of the pier in 2006

On August Bank Holiday 1931, a fire broke out in the wooden theatre. A dramatic sea and land rescue commenced, with the fire department attending the scene until the fire burnt out three days later. Over 800 people survived. As a result, a large proportion of the pier was destroyed. The pier was rebuilt at a cost of £3,157, without replacement of the wooden pavilion.

The remaining pavilion provided concerts and variety shows, but over time, people's tastes changed and the pavilion was turned into a cinema. This was unsuccessful however, and the cinema closed. After another attempt at operating it as a concert hall, it reopened in 1934 as the Marina Ballroom. This flourished and dances were taking place there until the start of World War II in 1939. At this time the paddle steamers were requisitioned and the pier closed to the public.

In 1947 the 7,130 ton Canadian cargo steamship SS Port Royal Park, under contract to the flag of the Tavistock Shipping Company, collided with the pier in a gale causing severe structural damage. The damage included the shattering and buckling of the decking, but more seriously, the fracturing or displacing of over seventy of the main supporting cast-iron structures. Repairs, including underpinning to the cast iron columns and the addition of new cast concrete columns, took two years to complete at a cost of £28,000. The pier reopened in 1950.

In August 1966, whilst operating in dense fog, the 600-ton P & A Campbell pleasure steamer PS Bristol Queen hit the pier, causing an estimated £25,000 damage. The last regular paddle steamer service operated by the White Funnel Line was withdrawn in 1966 although the MV Balmoral continued to operate a cruise service. Even this was withdrawn in 1982 when cruises by P&A Campbell from the pier ceased.

In 1994, a restoration programme was completed at a cost of £650,000, including repairs to the rotting substructure. This wood now forms one of the offerings at the souvenir shop. In 1996 a £1.7M programme started, replacing steelwork, decking and the berthing pontoon. The final restoration was completed after a £1.1 million grant from the Heritage Lottery Fund, with the restored 650 feet (200 m) formally reopening in May 1998.

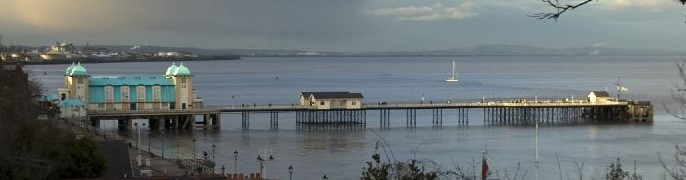
Penarth Pier in 2008.

== The pier pavilion ==
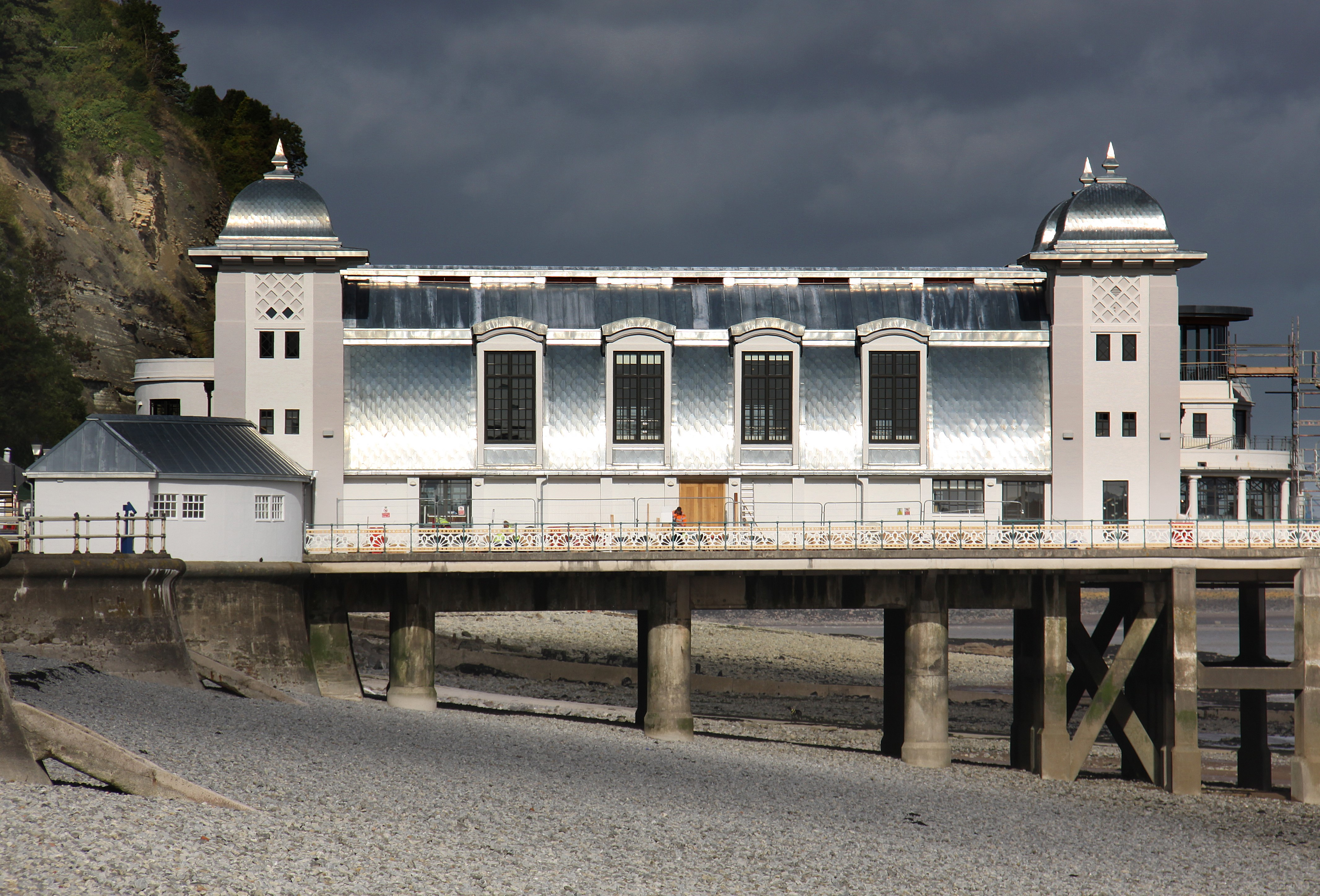
The refurbished Pier Pavilion in 2013

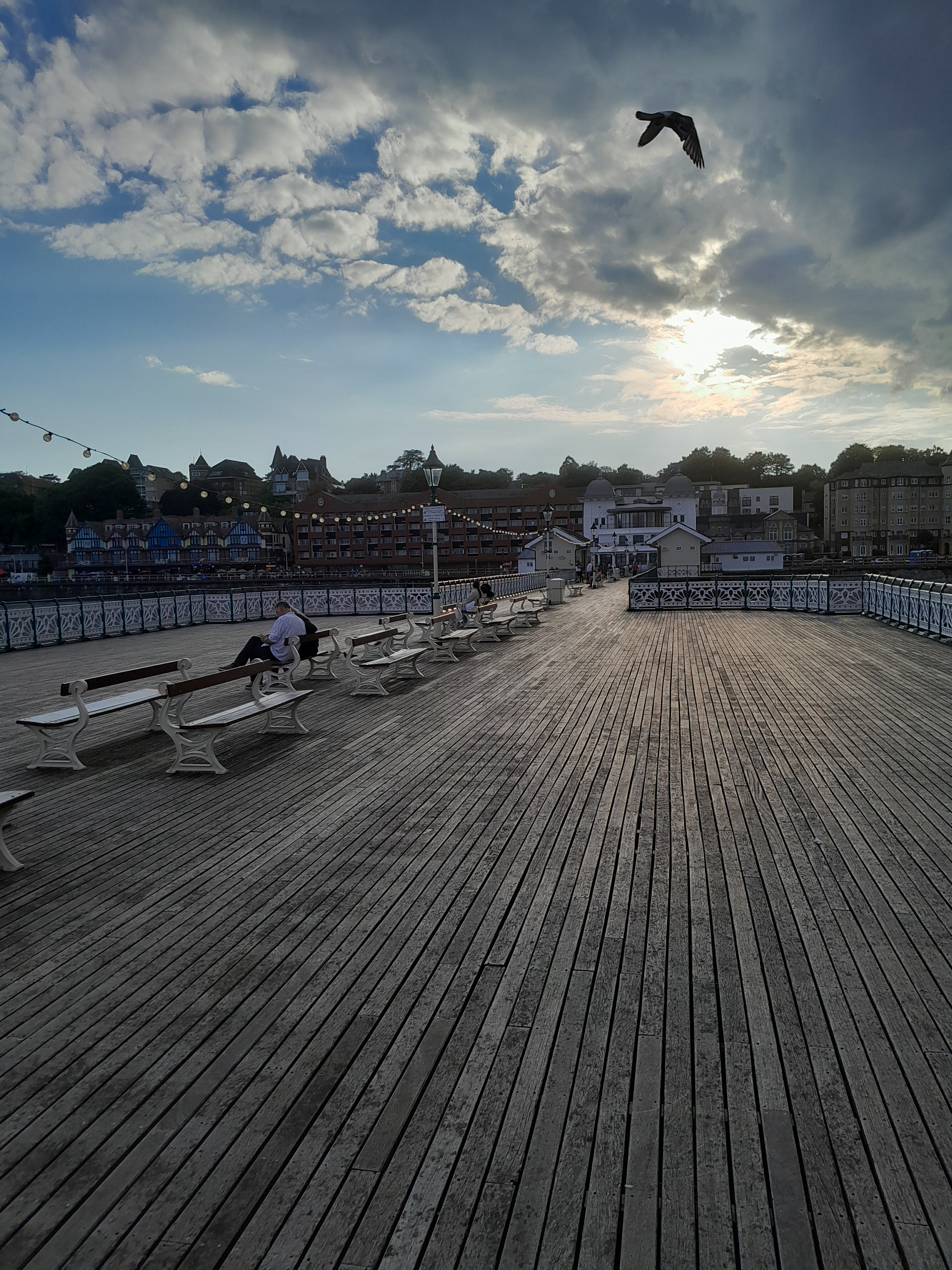
The Pier decking in July 2024

The 1929 designed art deco Pier Pavilion, opened in 1930 by the council, was used as a venue for traditional seaside entertainment, as well as a concert hall. As it lacked heating, the hall was greatly under utilised in the winter, although it was used at different periods as a cinema, dance hall (Marina ballroom) and nightclub.

From the 1960s onwards, it was rented out to a series of commercial tenant customers, who used it as a restaurant and snooker club. In 1961, former Olympics gymnast Gwynedd Lingard founded the Penarth and district gymnastics club, which today is the sole tenant.

In 2008, the charity Penarth Arts & Crafts Ltd (PACL) was formed to restore the pavilion. In November 2009 PACL were awarded a Heritage Lottery Fund grant of £99,600 to develop plans for detailed restoration. PACL have now developed a £3.9m refurbishment scheme, to use enable the pavilion to be restored as a cinema, cafe, observatory and multi-purpose community complex. After planning permission was granted for the project, the HLF awarded PACT a further £1.68m in May 2011. The project was completed in 2013 and is known as the Penarth Pier Pavilion.

== Present ==
Owned today by Vale of Glamorgan Council, the pier is open all year round. Sea fishing is possible from the pier head, without a licence, in all months except June, July and August.

The Penarth Pier Pavilion includes an art gallery, auditorium, a cinema able to seat seventy, retail area, bar, and a tea room with a view out over the Bristol Channel.

Dr David Trotman, was appointed director in 2013 and said that he was excited and privileged to serve the community, and added that the "iconic pier site would be used to educate, inform and entertain." Since then, renovation of the exterior has taken place, and ornamental zinc tiles have been installed to replace the faded paint on the barrel roof and four domes.

The pier was voted Pier of the Year by the National Piers Society in 2014.

Since 2007, the pier has appeared on S4C in an ident as part of its on-air branding.

The pier appeared in the 2008 BBC Torchwood episode "To the Last Man", in which characters Tosh and Tommy share a brief moment on Penarth Pier, built in 1894, the same year that Tommy was born.

A new director, Marta Ghermandi, was appointed by the Board of Penarth Arts and Crafts Limited, in 2018.

== Notes ==
Awards and achievements
Preceded by Clevedon Pier	National Piers Society; Pier of the Year; 2014	Succeeded by Cromer Pier
