= SR.N2 =

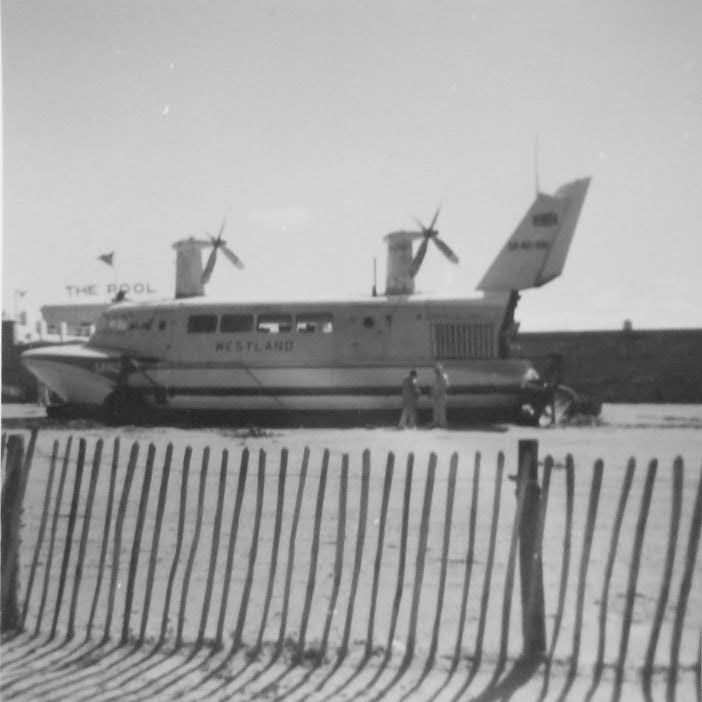
SR.N2 at Weston-super-Mare beach adjacent to The Pool outdoor lido

The SR.N2 was a hovercraft built by Westland and Saunders-Roe. It first flew in 1961. It weighed 27 tons and could carry 48 passengers. Although only one was built it is regarded as the prototype for commercial hovercraft, following on from the SR.N1 research craft. It was demonstrated on the Saint Lawrence River, Canada in 1962 and operated by P & A Campbell as a ferry crossing the Bristol Channel between Weston-super-Mare and Penarth in 1963. It was then fitted with deeper (4 ft) skirts to improve its performance in rough seas. Southdown Motor Services and Westland Aircraft ran the SR.N2 on the Solent between Eastney and Ryde in 1963/4, carrying 30,000 passengers. It was eventually broken up.

== SR.N2 Specifications ==
Length	19.80 m (65 ft 0 in)
Beam	9.14 m (30 ft 0 in)
Height (hovering)	8.20 m (26 ft 11 in)
Height (landed)	7.43 m (24 ft 5 in)
Max speed	73 kn (84 mph)
Hoverheight [Original]	0.77 m (2 ft 6 in)
Engines	4 x Bristol Siddeley Nimbus turboshaft engines 608 kW (815 hp) each (2 lift, 2 thrust)
Passengers [Designed]	38, 53 or [70]
Steering system	Variable-pitch propellers on rotating pylons and one rear rudder
