= Royal Pier Hotel, Clevedon =

Royal Pier Hotel
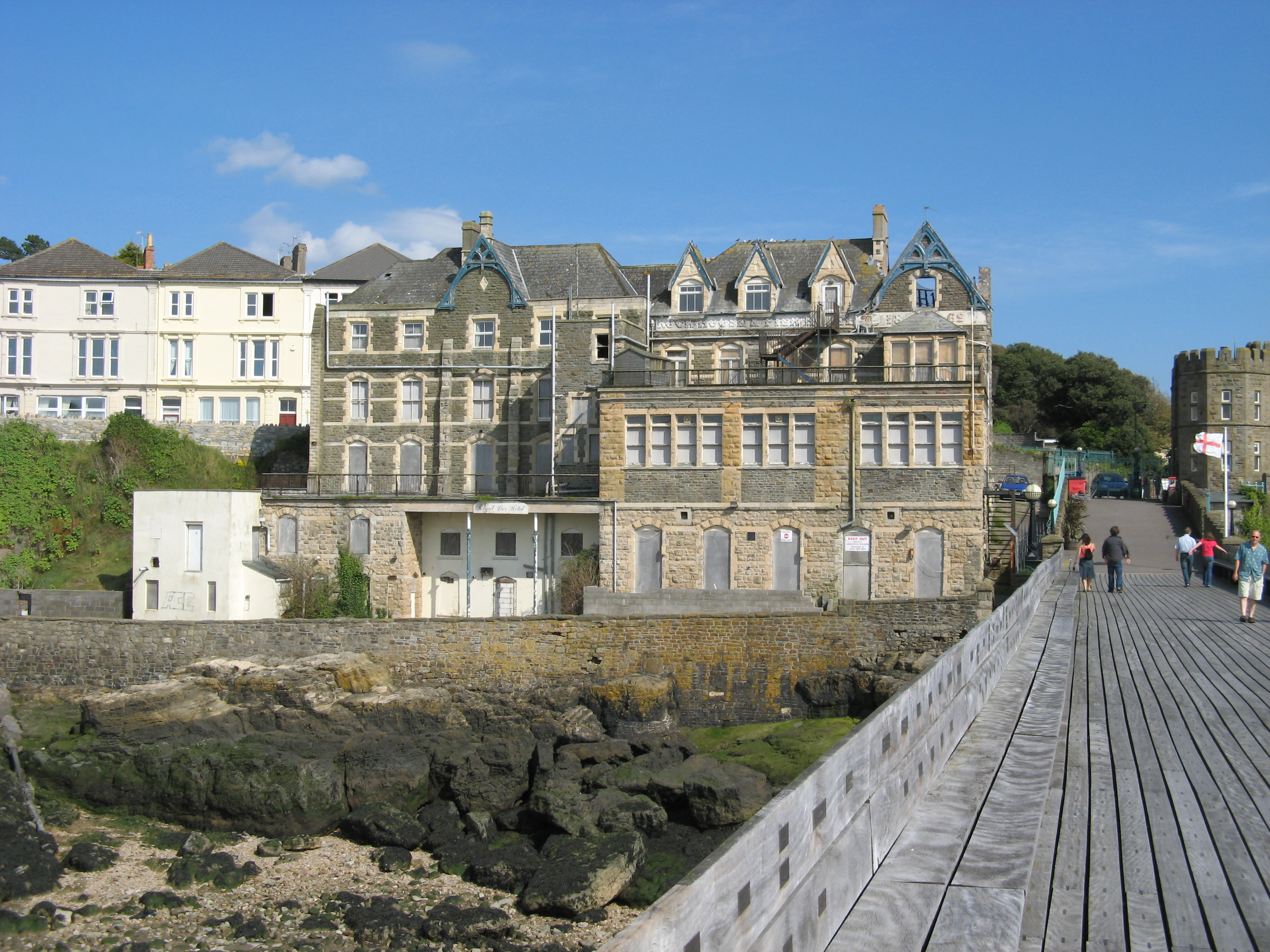
- Royal Pier Hotel, from Clevedon Pier

- Location within Somerset
- 51°26′40″N 2°51′37″W
- Location: Clevedon, North Somerset

History
- Built: 1823

Site notes
- Architect: Thomas Hollyman

Listed Building – Grade II
- Designated: 2001

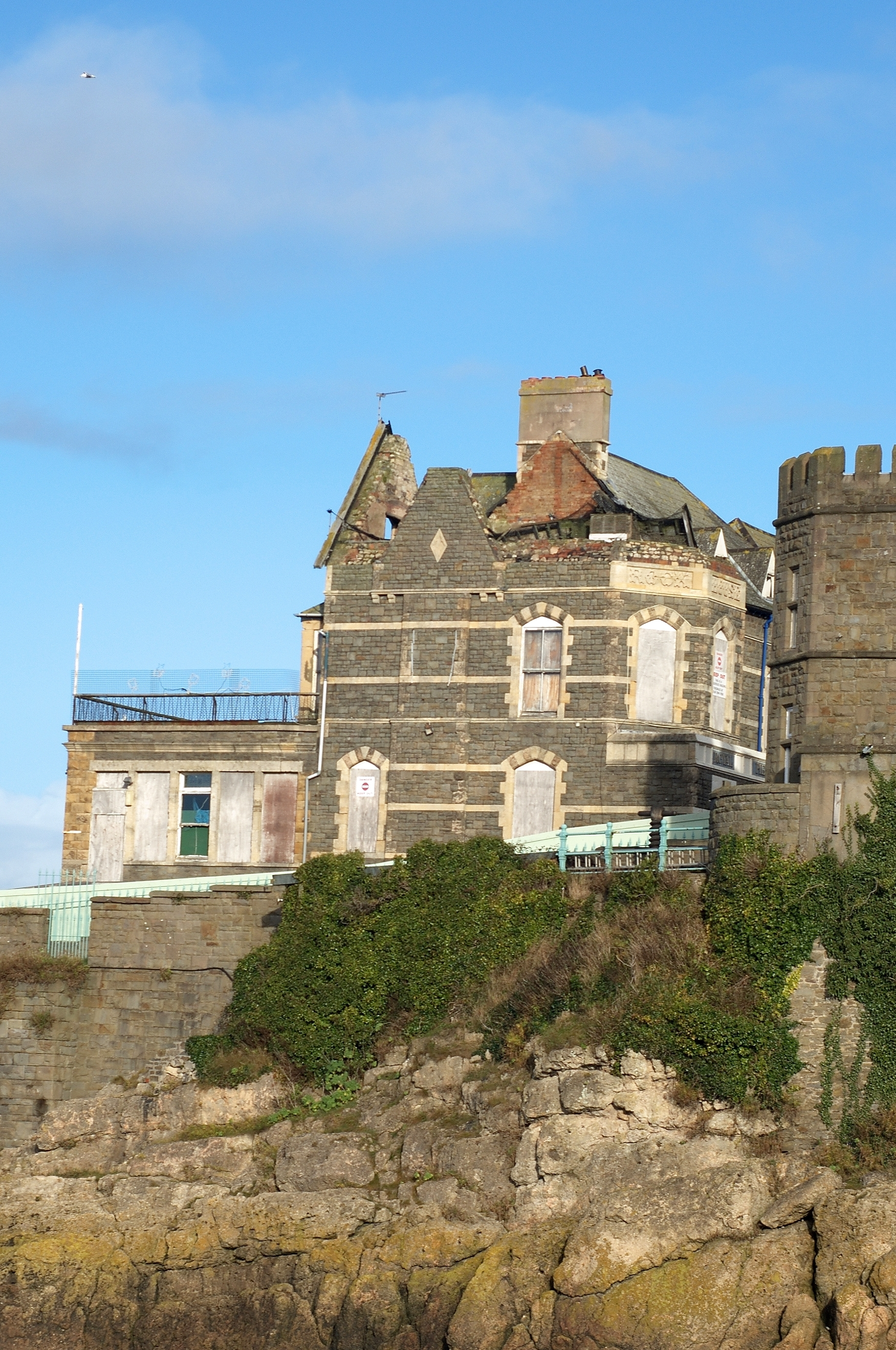
View from the beach, showing the hotel's damaged roof

The Royal Pier Hotel is a Grade II listed building in Clevedon, England.

== History ==
The Royal Pier Hotel, originally known as the Rock House, was built in 1823 by Thomas Hollyman. In 1868, the building was expanded by local architect Hans Price and renamed Rock House & Royal Pier Hotel, subsequently shortened to Royal Pier Hotel. Since its closure in October 2001, the building fell into disrepair. In the same year, huge public uproar saved the hotel from demolition. In May 2003, one end of the hotel was ruined in a fire, and despite numerous planning applications to turn the building into flats, it remained derelict.

In 2009 local town councilor David Shopland unsuccessfully called for the hotel's Grade II listed status to be removed, to make planning applications easier and the site more attractive to developers.

In 2014–2016 the hotel was converted into apartments, with some features of the existing building retained and other parts replaced by new development.

== Location ==
The hotel is situated on the cliffs of Clevedon's seafront, adjacent to Clevedon Pier.

== See also ==
- Clevedon Pier
