= Sirron Cars =

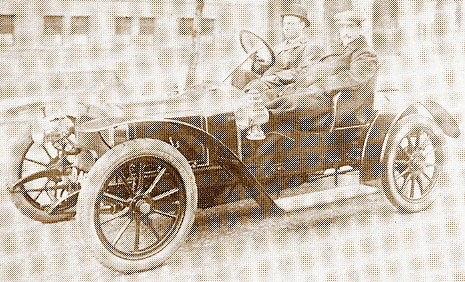
1911 Sirron 10/14 hp car

Sirron Cars were built at York Works, South Road, Southall, Middlesex, England, from 1909 to 1914. Several models were produced, ranging from 10 to 25 horsepower. A typical Sirron was priced at 200 guineas.

== History ==
The Sirron name was later used by the Newbury Diesel Company for its diesel engines, which were designed by Henry Kent Norris. Sirron is Norris spelt backwards. Henry Kent Norris (died 1969) was a racing motorist who took part in Tourist Trophy races before World War I. It is not known whether Henry Kent Norris was connected with Sirron Cars.
