= PS Cardiff Queen =

P&A Campbell Passenger Vessel

History
- Name: 1947–1968: Cardiff Queen
- Operator: 1947–1968: P and A Campbell, Bristol
- Port of registry: (United Kingdom)
- Builder: Fairfield Govan
- Yard number: 738
- Launched: 25 February 1947
- Out of service: 9 April 1968
- Fate: Scrapped 1968

General characteristics
- Tonnage: 765 gross register tons (GRT)
- Length: 247 feet (75 m)
- Beam: 59 feet (18 m)
- Draught: 7 feet (2.1 m)
- Propulsion: Triple expansion three cylinder engines

PS Cardiff Queen was a passenger vessel built for P & A Campbell in 1947.

== History ==
She was built in 1947 by Fairfield, Govan, and launched on 25 February 1947 by Mrs W.J. Banks, wife of the managing director of P & A Campbell.

She was built as a replacement for ships lost during the Second World War, and operated pleasure cruises in the Bristol Channel, often to Ilfracombe. She entered service on 21 June 1947.

On 27 August 1949, she ran aground on Lynmouth Sand Ridge. The PS Bristol Queen was fetched from Ilfracombe to take the passengers on board.

On 9 April 1968 she sailed for the last time to Cashmore’s scrap yard at Newport on the mouth of the Usk.
