= Plenty and Son =

English engineering notation

Plenty and Son of Eagle Ironworks, Newbury, Berkshire, England, was an engineering company specialising in marine steam engines. The company was founded in 1800. In 1928, the company started to manufacture diesel engines under the name Plenty-Still, at Kings Road, Newbury. In 1932, the diesel engine business became a separate company named the Newbury Diesel Company. The Plenty name is now owned by SPX FLOW. In May 2026, it was announced that the company will be ceasing operations, starting June 6, 2026.

== Takeovers ==
Around 1970, Plenty and Son was acquired by Booker McConnell and, by 1977, it had become part of the Booker Group's fluid engineering division, supplying pumps and related equipment to the oil industry. In 2001, Plenty was acquired by SPX FLOW. There are now (August 2017) three divisions: Plenty Filters in Newbury, Plenty Mixers in Manchester and Plenty Pumps in Glasgow.

== Newbury Diesel Company ==
The Newbury Diesel Company (NDC), which was a separate business from 1932, produced the "Sirron" range of engines. Henry Kent Norris was prominent in the company and the "Sirron" name is Norris spelt backwards. Sirron diesels were fitted to the MV Balmoral. In 1936, NDC became a wholly owned subsidiary of the shipping company, F.T. Everard and Sons. In 2006/2007 F.T. Everard and Sons was acquired by James Fisher & Sons and became James Fisher Everard.

== See also ==
- Sirron Cars
