= PS Waverley (1885) =

Clyde-built paddle steamer (1885 - 1920)

History

United Kingdom
- Name: PS Waverley (1885–1917); HMS Way (1917–1920)
- Owner: Captain Bob Campbell; P & A Campbell
- Builder: H. McIntyre & Co., Paisley
- Launched: 19 May 1885
- In service: 1885
- Out of service: 1916
- Fate: Scrapped in 1920

General characteristics
- Tonnage: 258 GRT
- Length: 205 ft

PS Waverley was a Clyde-built paddle steamer that carried passengers on the Clyde between 1885 and 1887, then on the Bristol Channel from 1887 until 1916, when she was requisitioned by the Admiralty to serve as a minesweeper during World War I.

== History ==
Waverley was built by H. McIntyre & Company, Paisley, and was initially owned by Captain Bob Campbell, replacing his PS Meg Merrilies taking passengers between Glasgow and Kilmun on the north shore of the Holy Loch. She was competing for passengers with PS Benmore owned by Captain Buchanan, and that competition eventually resulted in a collision as they both raced to reach Kilcreggan pier; both captains were fined five pounds. The following year, Waverley was replaced on the Kilmun route by the smaller PS Madge Wildfire while she sailed a route between Glasgow to Millport and Ayr.

In 1887, she was chartered to the Bristol Channel Marine Excursion Company to operate sailings from Bristol to seaside towns like Ilfracombe and Weston-super-Mare. In 1888, Captain Bob Campbell died and ownership of Waverley passed to his sons Alex and Peter, and they considered the Bristol Channel sailings such a success that they sold their Clyde steamers PS Meg Merrilies and PS Madge Wildfire to Caledonian Steam Packet Company and relocated themselves and their business to Bristol, forming P & A Campbell. From 1896 to 1916 she sailed between Weston-super-Mare and Cardiff, with a single season in 1911 operating cruises from Hastings.

== World War I ==
Towards the end of World War I, Waverley was requisitioned by the Admiralty to serve as minesweeper HMS Way out of Swansea and then later on the river Thames. She was returned to her owners in 1919 but was scrapped a year and a half later without being returned to service.
