= P & A Campbell =

- Industry: Shipping
- Founded: 1893
- Defunct: 1979
- Headquarters: Bristol, United Kingdom
- Area served: Bristol Channel
- Services: Passenger transportation

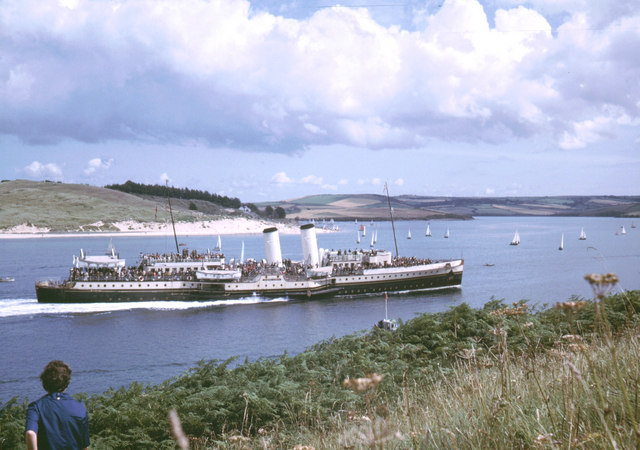
Bristol Queen in the Camel Estuary, 1965

P & A Campbell was a shipping company based in Bristol which operated steamship services in the Bristol Channel between 1893 and 1979.

== History ==
In the early 19th century, steamships were introduced to Europe with Clyde steamer sailings which grew rapidly, with many private shipowners taking trippers and commuters from Glasgow down the River Clyde to previously remote areas where holiday houses had been developed around the Firth of Clyde. Robert Campbell, known as "Captain Bob", came from a family associated with sailings to the Gare Loch. In 1854 he became master of the Gareloch steamboat Duchess of Argyle bought by two of his uncles, and developed a good public reputation as captain of successive ships as their fleet took on sailings from Kilmun on the Holy Loch. In 1864 one was sold as a Confederate blockade runner; its replacement, Vivid, was built to run "in connection with the express trains on the Greenock Railway".

Captain Bob Campbell's sons Peter and Alexander Campbell were also captains, and when he suffered long-term illness they took over running of the fleet. In 1887 their paddle steamer Waverley was taken by Peter to the Bristol Channel on a charter, with great success, after a shaky start when the Campbells were summoned before the Bristol Magistrates in July 1887 for having an uncertified engineer for the Waverley.

At this time the Caledonian Railway was extending the Greenock Railway to Gourock railway station and pier. In 1888 the Campbells agreed to sell them two of their steamers as the nucleus of the Caledonian Steam Packet Company, along with the goodwill of the Kilmun business. After Captain Bob died, Peter and Alexander Campbell moved their business to Bristol, and set up the White Funnel fleet for coastal cruising.

The company was formally created in 1893 and used the White Funnel image as a company logo. During the First World War twelve of the fleet were requisitioned by the Admiralty as minesweepers and a troop ship. Two ships, Brighton Queen and Lady Ismay, were lost.

During the Second World War the fleet was requisitioned again. Four new vessels were planned after the war, but only PS Bristol Queen and PS Cardiff Queen were built. They lasted until 1967 and 1968 respectively. After this the company used motor vessels until 1979 when it finally folded.

The company had a brief fling with high speed craft in the summer of 1963, using the experimental SR.N2 hovercraft as a ferry between Penarth and Weston-super-Mare.

== Archives ==
Records of P & A Campbell are held at Bristol Archives (Ref. 37980) (online catalogue 1), (Ref. 40140) (online catalogue 2), (Ref. 40505) (online catalogue 3).

== Vessels operated by Campbell ==
The PS prefix indicates a paddle steamer.

- PS Waverley 1885–1917 (renamed HMS Way during WWI, scrapped 1921)
- Ravenswood 1891–1955
- Westward Ho 1894–1946
- Cambria 1895–1946
- Britannia 1896–1956
- Lady Margaret 1895–1905
- Glen Rosa 1897–1921 (built 1877)
- Albion 1899–1921 (built 1893)
- Bonnie Doon 1899–1913 (built 1876)
- Scotia 1899–1903 (built 1880)
- Princess May 1901–1902 (built 1893)
- Brighton Queen 1901–1915 (built 1897)
- Lady Ismay 1911–1915
- PS Waverley 1911–1939 (Barry built 1907, obtained from the Barry Railway Company in 1911, renamed Waverley 1925–1939, then HMS Snaefell sunk 1941)
- Devonia 1911–1940 (Built 1905, obtained form the Barry Railway Company in 1911)
- Tintern 1911–1913 (Westonia built 1899, obtained form the Barry Railway Company in 1911)
- Glen Avon 1912–1944
- Glen Usk 1914–1963
- Glen Gower 1922–1960
- Lady Moyra 1922–1940 (built in 1905)
- Brighton Belle 1922–1940 (built in 1900)
- Vecta 1939–1972 (renamed Westward Ho in 1965)
- Empress Queen 1940–1955
- PS Bristol Queen 1946–1968
- PS Cardiff Queen 1947–1968
- Crested Eagle 1957 (built 1938)
- SR.N2 hovercraft, 1963 (built 1961)
- St Trillo 1963–1975 (built 1936)
- Queen of the Isles 1968–1970 (built 1964)
- MV Balmoral 1969–1980
- Devonia 1977–1980 (built 1955)
