= PS Bristol Queen =

British paddle steamer

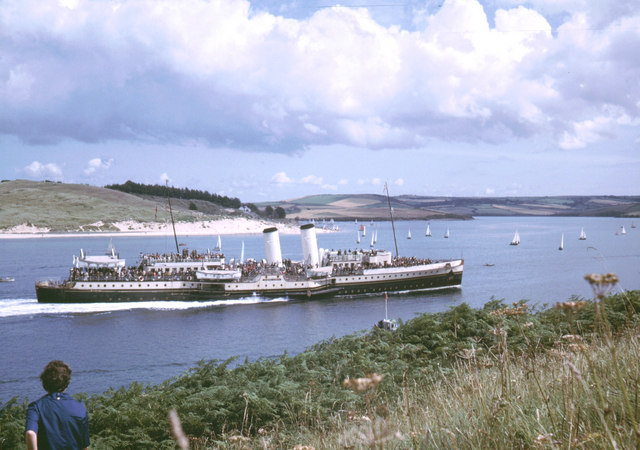
- Bristol Queen in the Camel Estuary in August 1965

History

United Kingdom
- Name: Bristol Queen
- Operator: P & A Campbell
- Port of registry: Bristol
- Route: Bristol – Ilfracombe
- Builder: Charles Hill & Sons
- Yard number: 334
- Launched: 4 April 1946
- Completed: September 1946
- In service: 24 September 1946
- Out of service: 26 August 1967
- Identification: UK official number 169391; call sign GRGL
- Fate: Scrapped 1968

General characteristics
- Tonnage: 961 GRT, 387 NRT
- Length: 258.7 ft (78.9 m) overall; 244.7 ft (74.6 m) registered
- Beam: 31.2 ft (9.5 m)
- Depth: 10.5 ft (3.2 m)
- Decks: 1
- Installed power: 2,700 ihp (2,014kW)
- Propulsion: Rankin & Blackmore triple expansion three crank diagonal engines
- Speed: 19.4 knots (35.9 km/h; 22.3 mph) trial speed (1946)

PS Bristol Queen was a British passenger excursion vessel built for P & A Campbell in 1946.

== History ==
Construction of the Bristol Queen began at Charles Hill & Sons yard, Bristol as yard number 334. She was launched on 4 April 1946 by the Lady Mayoress of Bristol, Mrs J. Owen, with a bottle of Bristol Cream sherry. The engines were made by Rankin & Blackmore, Greenock, works number 517. R&B also built Waverley’s engine.

The Queen was built as a replacement for P & A Campbell ships lost during the Second World War, and operated pleasure cruises in the Bristol Channel, often to Ilfracombe.

On 20 August 1966, the paddle steamer struck Penarth Pier damaging the pier head.

On 26 August 1967, Bristol Queen was taken out of service after an accident to a paddle wheel, the vessel was retired, then scrapped the following year.

== Bibliography ==
- Lloyd's Register of Shipping. Vol. Steamers and Motorships of 300 tons gross and over, Steamers and Motorships under 300 tons, trawlers, tugs, dredgers, &c, Sailing Vessels, List of ship owners, &c. London: Lloyd's Register of Shipping. 1946 – via Internet Archive.
- Register Book. Vol. I Register of Ships. London: Lloyd's Register of Shipping. 1959 – via Internet Archive.
