= MV Balmoral (1949) =

Vintage excursion ship

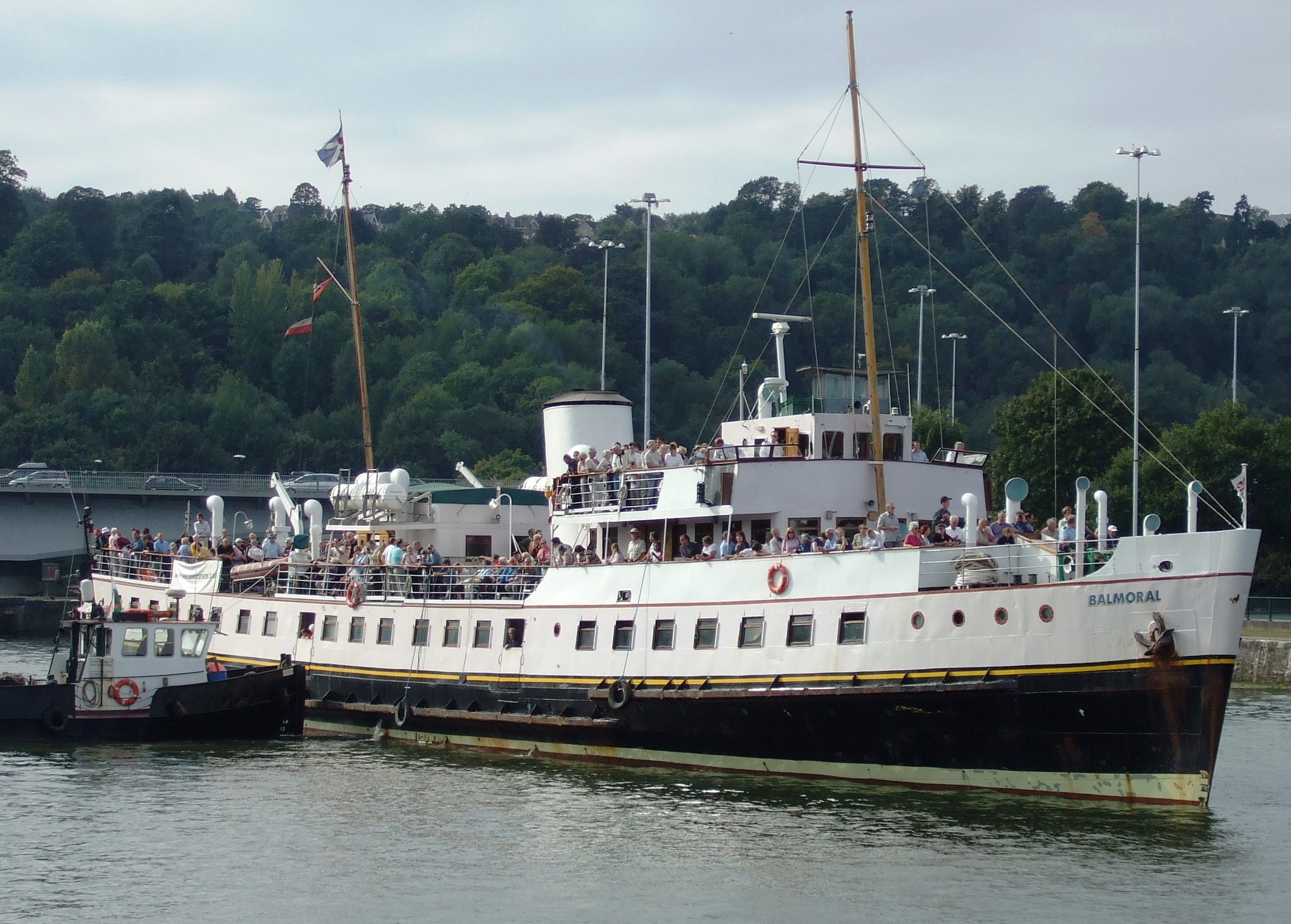
- MV Balmoral arriving at Bristol

History

United Kingdom
- Name: Balmoral
- Owner: MV Balmoral Fund Limited
- Builder: John I. Thornycroft & Company, Woolston
- Cost: £154,750
- Yard number: 4120
- Laid down: 1947
- Launched: 27 June 1949
- Out of service: September 2017
- Identification: IMO number: 5034927
- Status: Laid up

General characteristics
- Class & type: Coastal excursion vessel
- Tonnage: 736 GRT
- Length: 203 ft 6 in (62.03 m)
- Beam: 32 ft 0 in (9.75 m)
- Depth: 2.71
- Decks: 4
- Installed power: 1,192 kW
- Propulsion: Original: 2 x 6-cyl Newbury Sirron "O" type diesel engines. Refit: 2 x 6-cyl Grenaa diesel engines

MV Balmoral is a vintage excursion ship owned by MV Balmoral Fund Ltd., a preservation charity. Her principal area of operation is the Bristol Channel, although she also operates day excursions to other parts of the United Kingdom. The Balmoral is included on the National Historic Ships register as part of the National Historic Fleet.

== History ==
Balmoral was built as a ferry by John I. Thornycroft & Company at Woolston in 1949, for the Southampton, Isle of Wight and South of England Royal Mail Steam Packet Co. Limited, more normally known as the Red Funnel line. As built, Balmoral could carry up to 10 cars on her aft car deck, and she normally operated on her owner's ferry service from Southampton on the English mainland to Cowes on the Isle of Wight. From her introduction she also occasionally performed excursion duties, but as dedicated car ferries were introduced to her main route, her role became more focussed on offering coastal cruises around the South Coast.

Red Funnel ceased operating excursions in 1968, after which Balmoral was acquired by P & A Campbell. She moved to the Bristol Channel, where she became part of P&A Campbell's White Funnel Fleet until 1980, by which time she was the last working member of the fleet. Balmoral moved to Dundee to become a floating restaurant. This was unsuccessful and the ship was placed for sale again.

== Preservation ==
At this time the Waverley Steam Navigation Co. Ltd were looking for another vessel to operate alongside the world's last seagoing paddle steamer, PS Waverley. Balmoral was purchased by them and subjected to a major refit. As part of this, her car deck was enclosed to form an area that is now in use as a dining saloon.

Balmoral returned to the Bristol Channel in 1986. Since then the ship has operated a summer season of excursions around the Bristol Channel, with visits to most areas of the UK. In winter 2002, Balmoral received new engines, her original twin 6-cyl Newbury Sirron diesels were removed and replaced with a pair of Danish-built Grenaa diesel engines.

This work was partially funded by a grant from the Heritage Lottery Fund. Balmoral can now accommodate up to 800 passengers and has a self-service restaurant on board, along with two licensed bars, a heated observation lounge and a souvenir shop.

== Refit ==
In December 2012 Waverley Excursions and Waverley Steam Navigation announced that Balmoral would not be sailing in 2013. The ship's operation has been hampered increasingly in recent years by extreme weather conditions.

In 2015, ownership of MV Balmoral was transferred to a new registered charity MV Balmoral Fund Limited, and she is now operated by their subsidiary, White Funnel Ltd.

Following a refit costing over £300,000 and with help from a Coastal Communities Fund Grant, Balmoral started public sailing again on 19 June 2015.

It was announced in December 2017 that she would not be sailing in 2018 as she requires major hull plating work. That work was completed in Albion dry dock, which she left on 19 July 2024. It is planned to resume excursions in 2025.

== In popular culture ==
Balmoral appeared in the 2018 film The Guernsey Literary and Potato Peel Pie Society.

Balmoral was also hired in the 2017 drama Another Mother's Son, featuring Ronan Keating and John Hannah

She also features in the 2019 film Stan and Ollie, a biographical comedy-drama based on the lives of the comedy double act Stan Laurel and Oliver Hardy.

In Television, she featured in BBC One's Easter 1916: The Enemy Files, starring Michael Portillo.

== Gallery ==
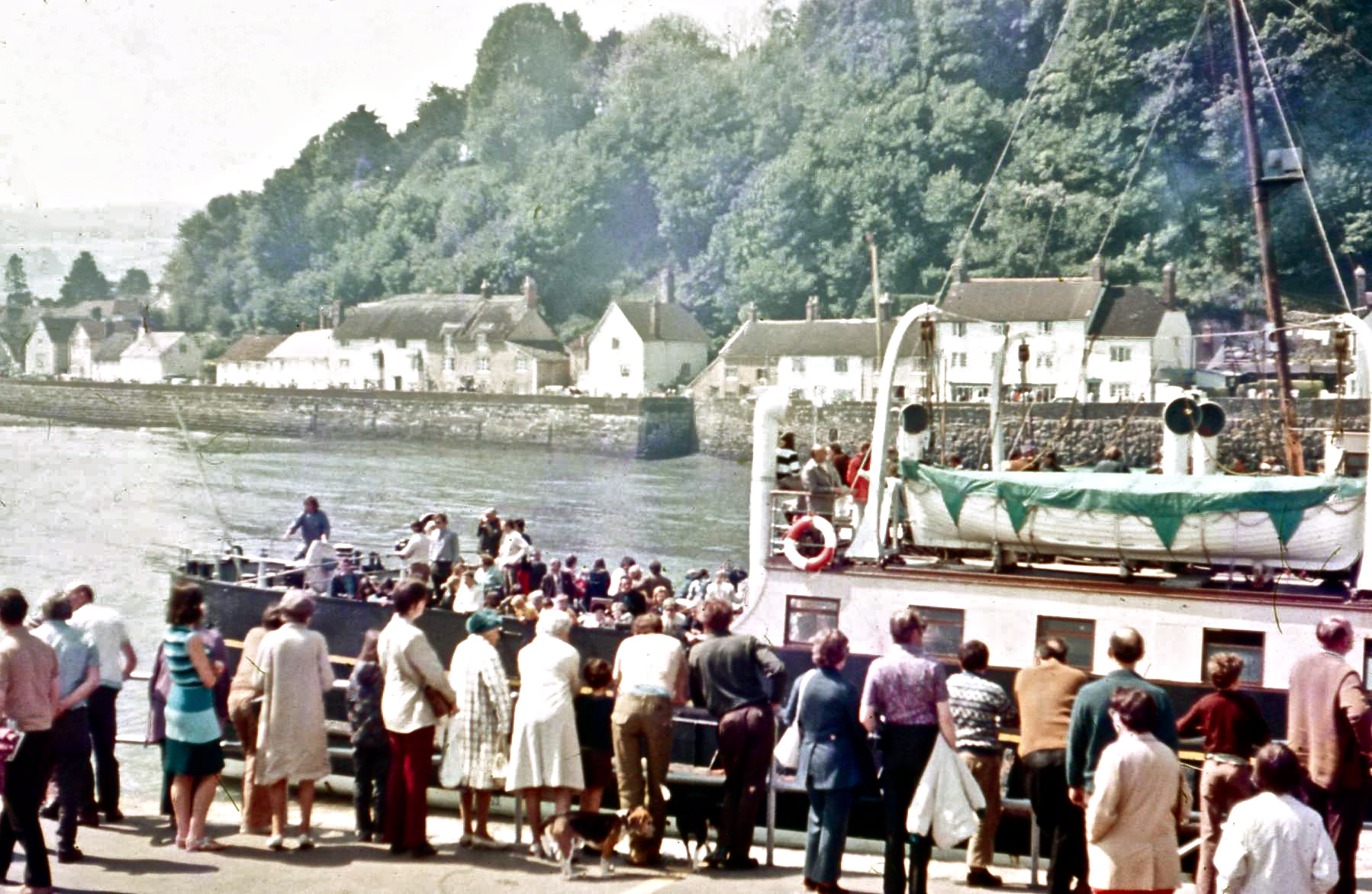
the car deck in 1974 at Minehead

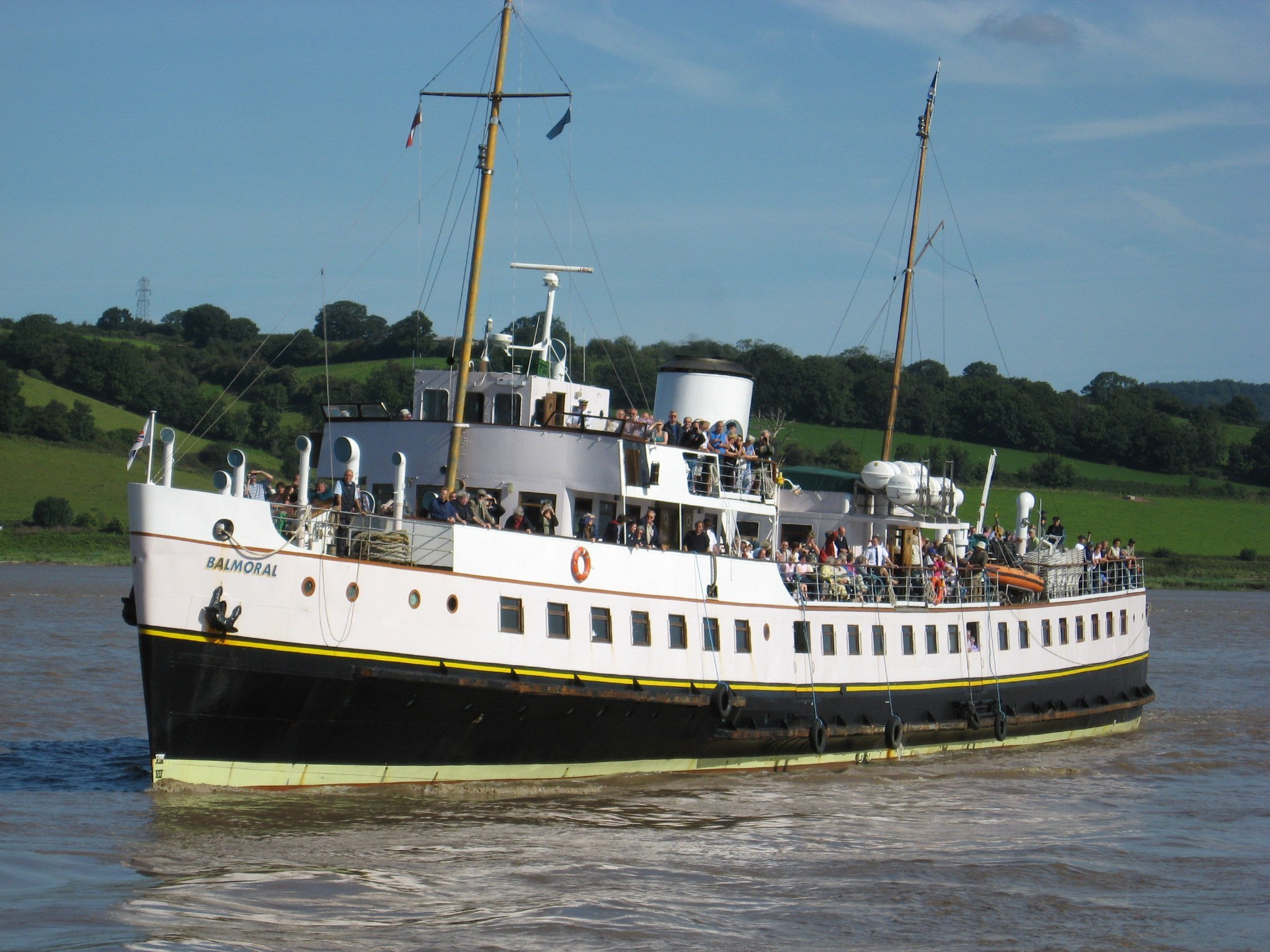
at Sharpness, Gloucestershire

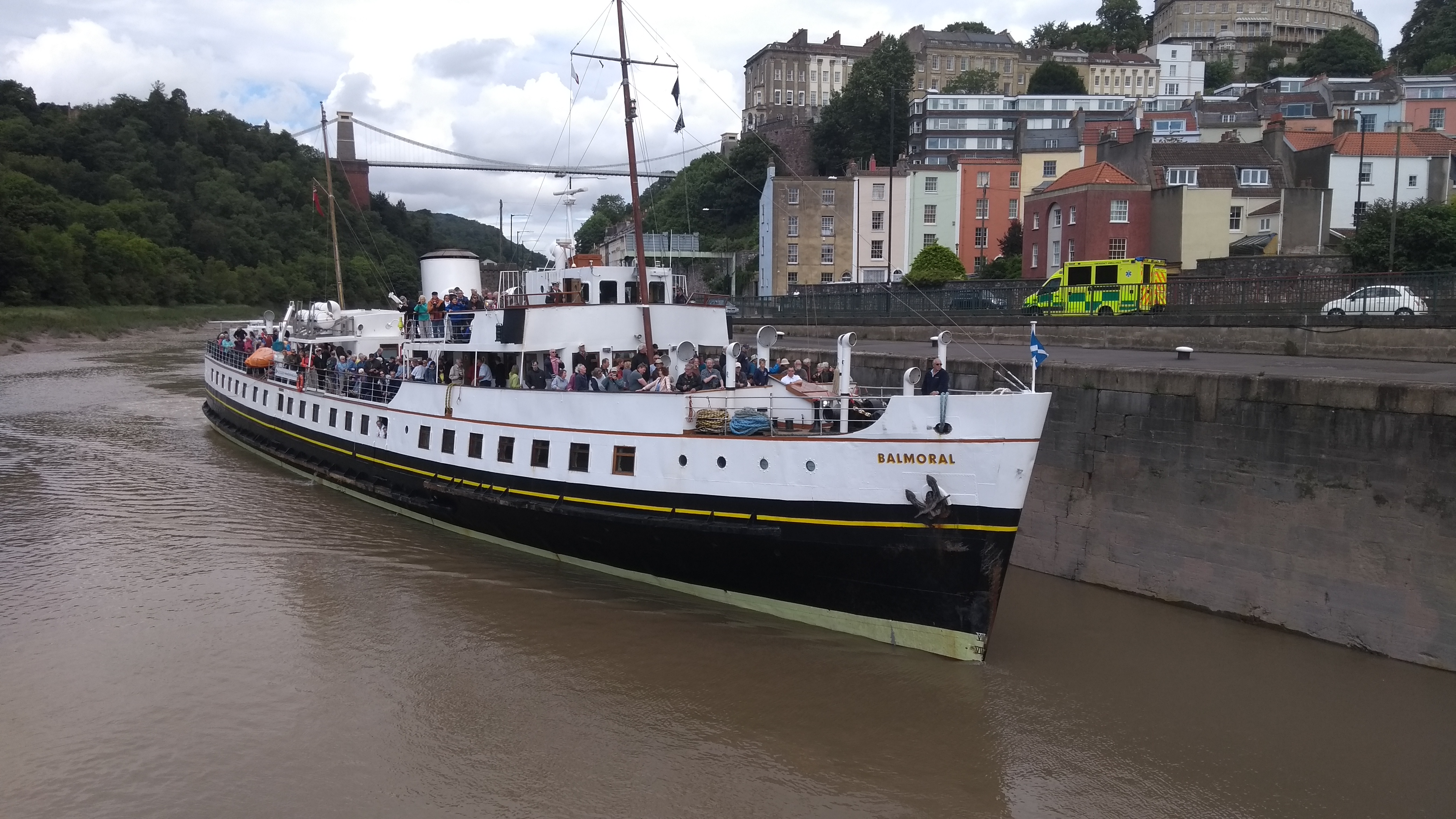
MV Balmoral pulls into Junction Lock, Bristol harbour, Aug 2017

== See also ==
- List of classic vessels
