= Clevedon =

Town and civil parish in Somerset, England

Coordinates: 51.438°N 2.854°W

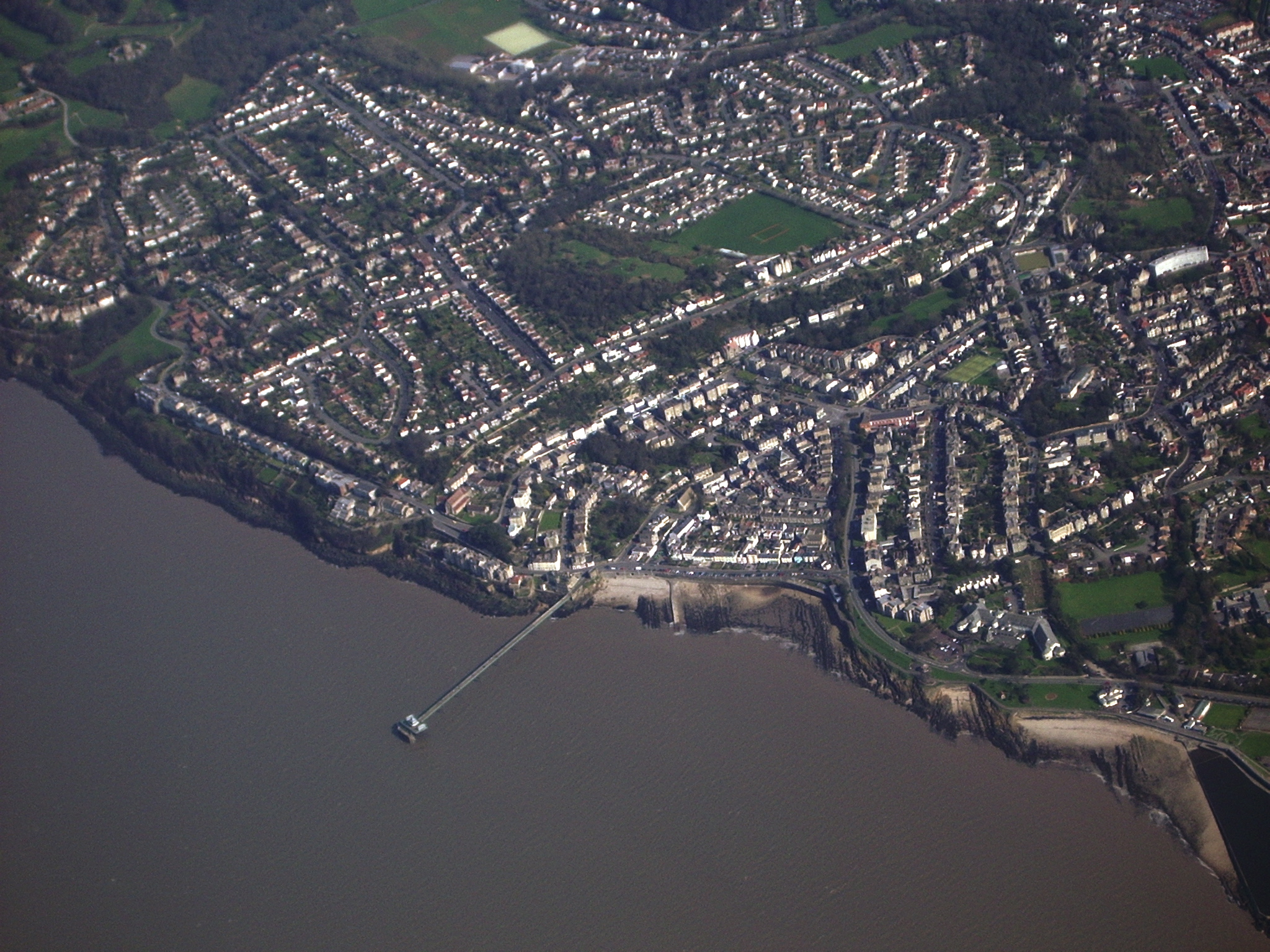
- View of Clevedon from the air, showing the pier

- Location within Somerset
- Population: 21,404 (Parish, 2021); 21,085 (Built up area, 2021)
- OS grid reference: ST406714
- Unitary authority: North Somerset
- Ceremonial county: Somerset
- Region: South West
- Country: England
- Sovereign state: United Kingdom
- Post town: CLEVEDON
- Postcode district: BS21
- Dialling code: 01275
- Police: Avon and Somerset
- Fire: Avon
- Ambulance: South Western
- UK Parliament: North Somerset
- Website: Town Council

Clevedon (/ˈkliːvdən/, KLEEV-dən) is a seaside town and civil parish in North Somerset, England. It lies along the Severn Estuary, among small hills that include Church Hill, Wain's Hill (topped by the remains of an Iron Age hillfort), Dial Hill, Strawberry Hill, Castle Hill, Hangstone Hill and Court Hill, a Site of Special Scientific Interest with overlaid Pleistocene deposits. It is mentioned in the Domesday Book of 1086. In the Victorian period, Clevedon developed into a seaside resort. At the 2021 census, the parish had a population of 21,404 and the built-up area had a population of 21,085.

== History ==
The name derives from the Old English cleve meaning "cleave" or "cleft" and don meaning "hill".

Wain's Hill is an univallate Iron Age hill fort approximately 1 mile (1.6 km) south-west of Clevedon. The hill fort is defined by a steep, natural slope from the south and north with two ramparts to the east.

The Domesday Book of 1086 mentions Clevedon as a holding of a tenant-in-chief by the name of Mathew of Mortaigne, with eight villagers and ten smallholders. Later, the parish of Clevedon formed part of the Portbury Hundred.

Two small rivers, the Land Yeo and Middle Yeo, supported at least two mills. The Tuck Mills stood in the fields south of Clevedon Court and were used for fulling cloth; other mills near Wain's Hill probably date from the early 17th century.

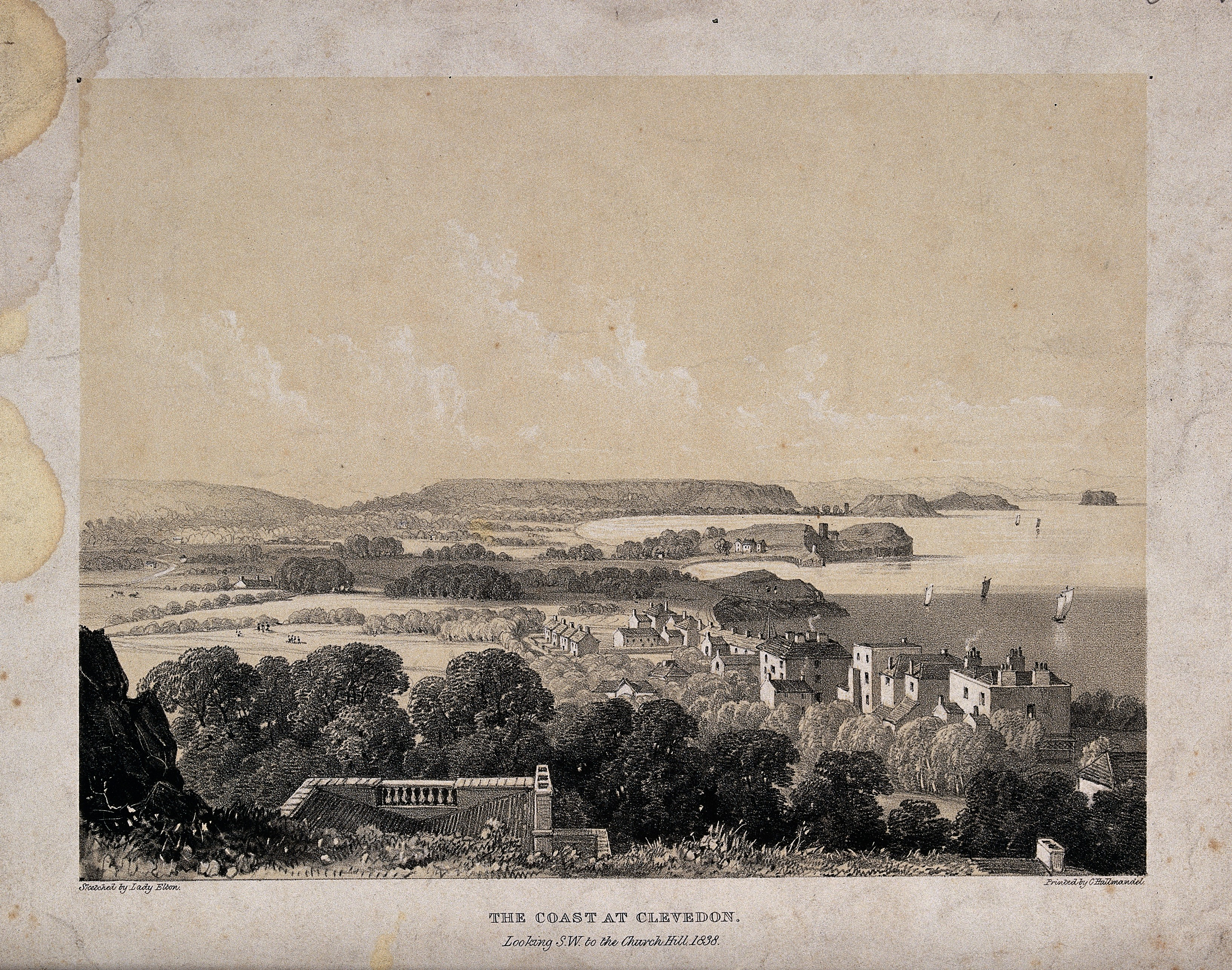
A coastal bay at Clevedon. Lithograph after a sketch by Lady Elton, 1838

Victorian Clevedon changed from a farming village into a popular seaside town. Clevedon Pier was completed in 1869 to serve as an embarkation point for paddle steamers. The Victorian craze for sea bathing was met in the late 19th century by saltwater baths (since demolished, though foundations remain), and bathing machines on the main beach near the pier.

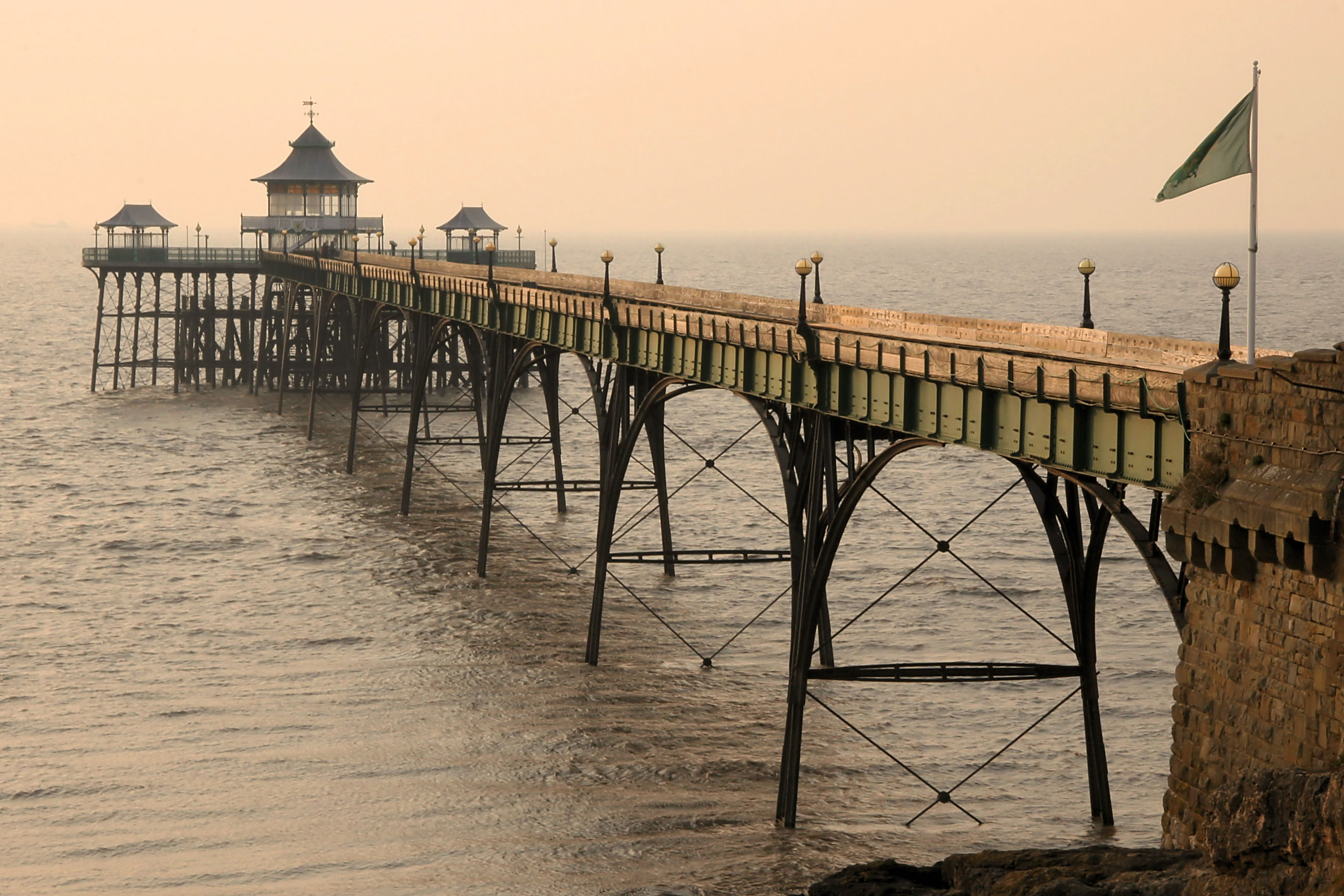
Clevedon Pier, which opened in 1869

The railway reached Clevedon in 1847 when a branch line from Yatton opened in 1847, six years after the main line. The branch line closed in 1966. The station site is now Queen's Square, a shopping precinct. The town was headquarters also for the Weston, Clevedon and Portishead Light Railway, which connected the three named coastal towns. It opened to Weston-super-Mare in 1897, was extended to Portishead ten years later, but closed in 1940. Its trains crossed the road in the town centre, known as The Triangle, preceded by a man with red and green flags.

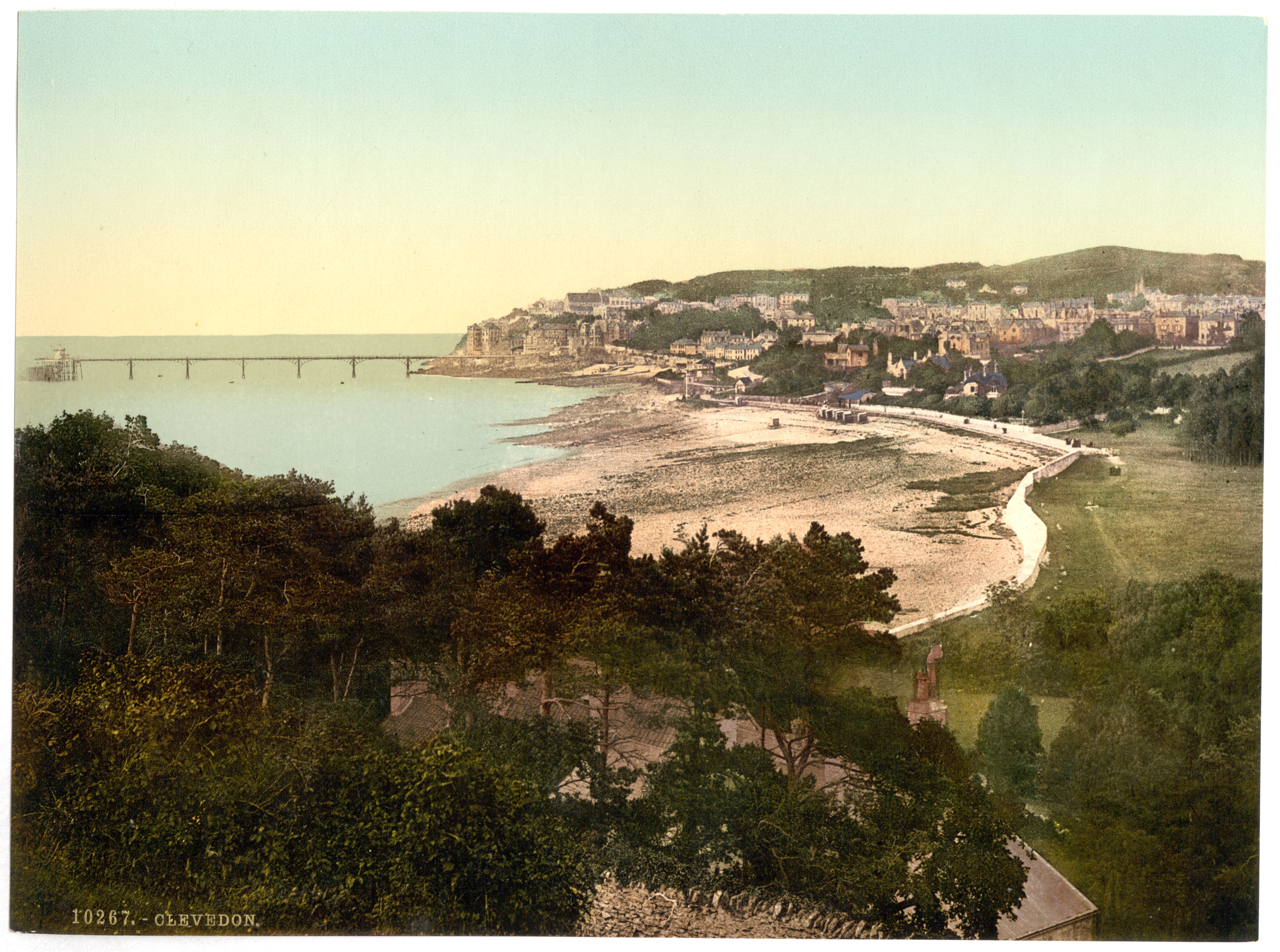
Clevedon about 1900

Clevedon was the site of St Edith's Children's Home for almost 100 years until it closed in 1974. It was run by nuns of the Community of the Sisters of the Church, an international body in the Anglican Communion living according to the Gospel values of poverty, chastity and obedience. The building on Dial Hill is listed, so that the outside has changed little, but now contains private flats.

The first large-scale production of penicillin took place in the town. In 1938 Howard Florey was working at Lincoln College, Oxford with Ernst Boris Chain and Norman Heatley when he read Alexander Fleming's paper on the antibacterial effects of Penicillium notatum mould. He arranged for this to be grown in deep culture tanks at the Medical Research Council's Antibiotic Research Station in Clevedon, enabling mass production of the mould for a medicine injected into forthcoming World War II soldiers suffering from infections.

== Geography ==
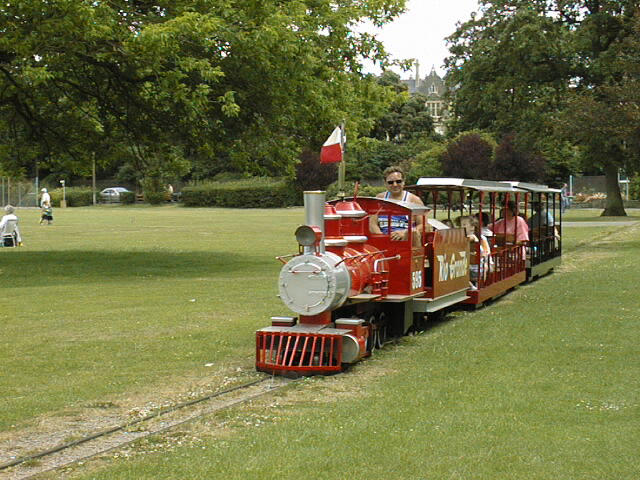
Salthouse Fields

Clevedon is situated on and round seven hills called Church Hill, Wain's Hill (topped by the remains of an Iron Age hill fort), Dial Hill, Strawberry Hill, Castle Hill, Hangstone hill and Court Hill, the last a Site of Special Scientific Interest. On a clear day there are far-reaching views across the Severn estuary to Wales. When visibility is good, the islands of Steep Holm and Flat Holm in the Bristol Channel can be seen. The tidal rise and fall in the Severn Estuary and Bristol Channel can be as great as 14.5 m (48 ft), second only to Bay of Fundy in Eastern Canada.

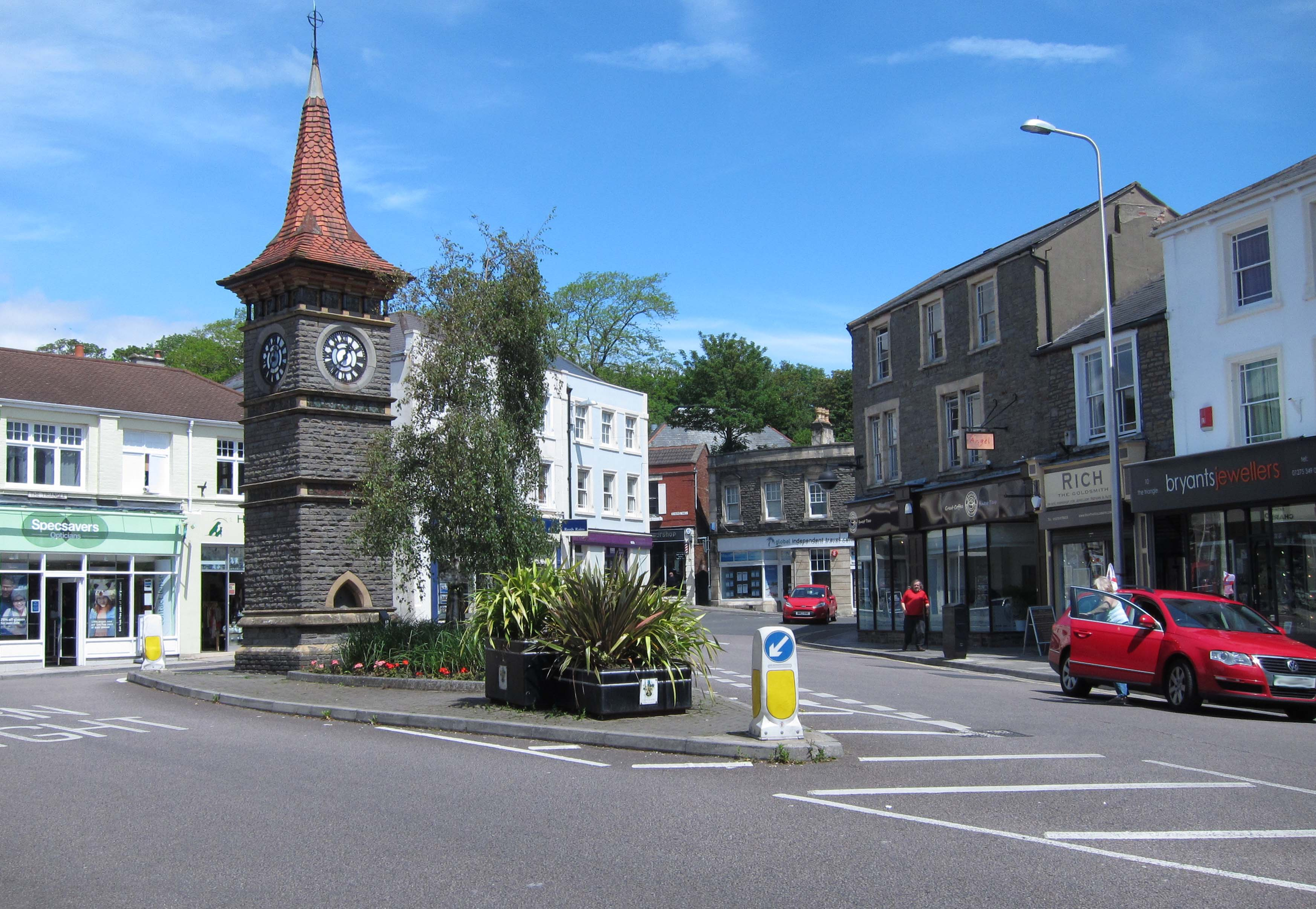
The clock tower in Clevedon town centre

The seafront runs about half a mile from the pier to Salthouse Field, with ornamental gardens, a Victorian bandstand, a bowling green, tennis courts, crazy golf and other amusements. Marine Lake, once a Victorian swimming pool, is used for boating and for a small festival once a year where people can try out new sports. Salthouse Field has a miniature railway around its perimeter, which originally opened in 1952 on a shorter track.

The shore at Clevedon marries pebbled beaches and low rocky cliffs, with the old harbour at the western edge of the town, at the mouth of the Land Yeo river. There John Ashley conceived of the idea for The Mission to Seafarers. The rocky beach has been designated as Clevedon Shore geological Site of Special Scientific Interest. It is the side of a mineralised fault running east–west adjacent to the pier and forms a small cliff feature in dolomitic conglomerate on the north side of Clevedon Beach, containing cream to pink baryte along with sulphides. Minerals identified include haematite, chalcopyrite, tennantite, galena, tetrahedrite, bornite, pyrite, marcasite, enargite and sphalerite. Secondary alteration of this has produced idaite, covellite and other Copper sulphides.

"Poets' Walk" is a footpath round Wain's Hill and Church Hill to the south-west of the seafront. The upper town contains many other footpaths through parks and wooded areas laid out in the 19th century. The name recalls poets who visited Clevedon, including Coleridge in 1795 and Tennyson in 1834. The local nature reserve covers Church Hill and Wain's Hill and includes calcareous grassland, coastal scrub and woodland.

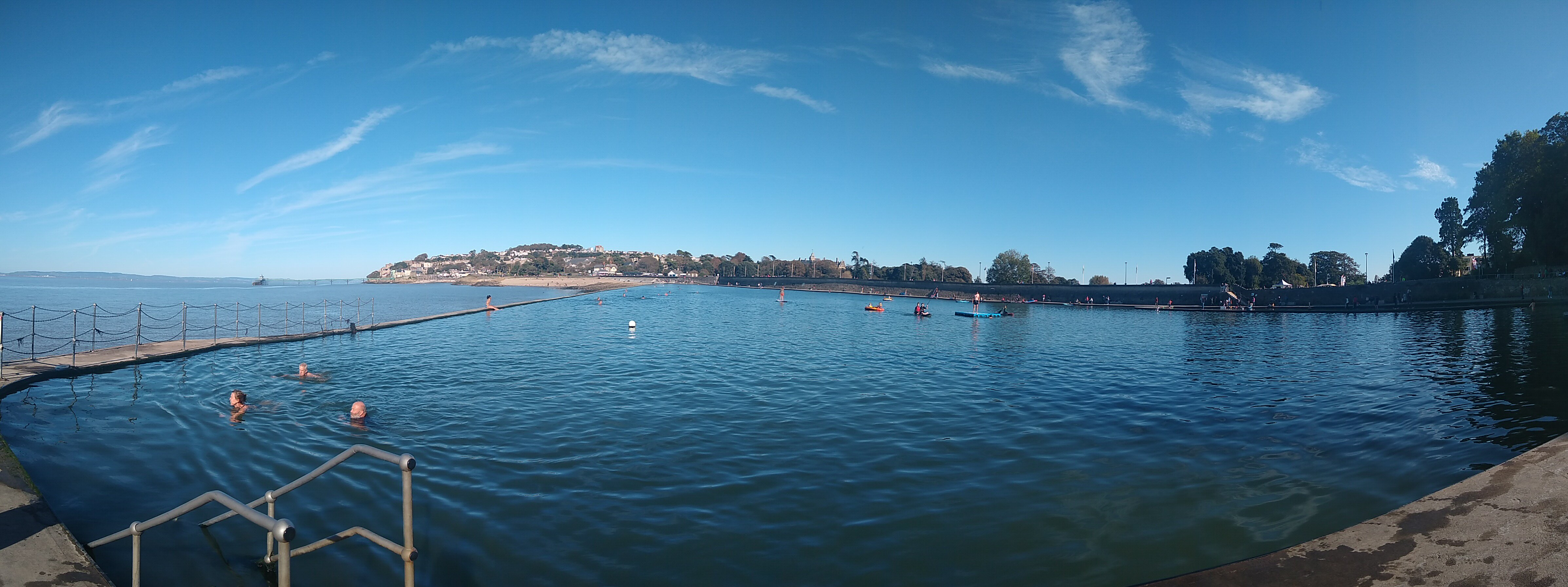
Marine Lake

Clevedon Marine Lake is a tidal pool with a surface area of 15,000 m^{2}, refreshed with salt water on spring tides. It is a safe place to play, swim and boat. It is popular with open water swimmers and an important part of Clevedon's community. It is run by a charity called Marlens, run by volunteers, who clean and maintain the lake.

The rocky beach has been designated as the Clevedon Shore Geological Site of Special Scientific Interest.

=== Climate ===
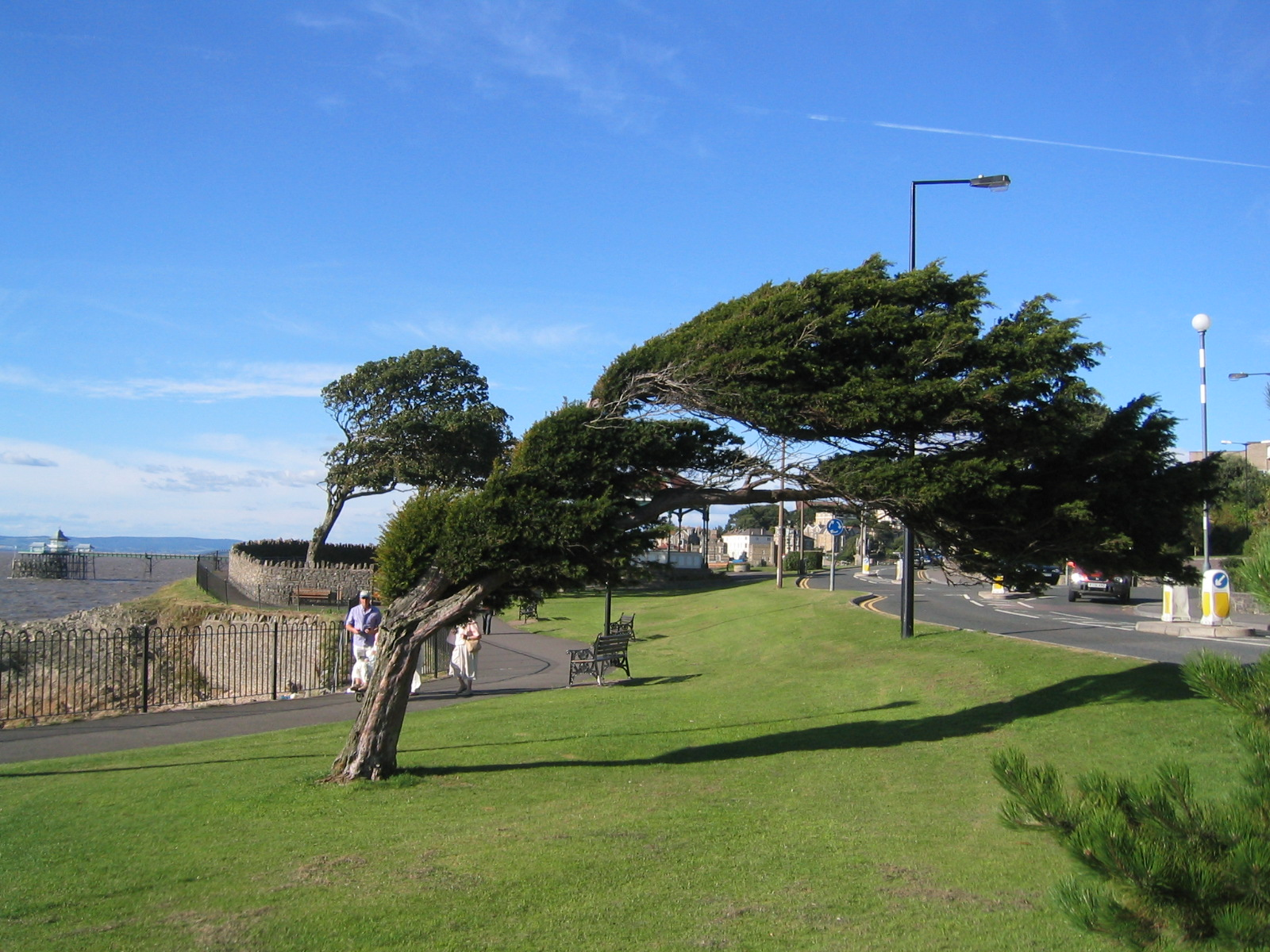
Windswept Clevedon seafront has shaped this tree

Clevedon, like the rest of South West England, has a temperate climate, generally wetter and milder than the rest of the country. The annual mean temperature is about 10 °C (50.0 °F). Seasonal temperature variation is less extreme than in most of the United Kingdom due to the adjacent sea temperatures. The summer months of July and August are the warmest, with mean daily maxima around 21 °C (69.8 °F). In winter, mean minimum temperatures of 1 °C (33.8 °F) or 2 °C (35.6 °F) are common. In the summer, the Azores high pressure affects the south-west of England, but convective cloud sometimes forms inland, reducing the number of hours of sunshine. Annual sunshine rates are slightly less than the regional average of 1,600 hours. Most autumn and winter rainfall results from Atlantic depressions, at their most active in those seasons. In summer, much of the rainfall is caused by the sun heating the ground, leading to convection, showers and thunderstorms. Average rainfall is about 700 mm (28 in). About 8–15 days of snowfall is typical. November to March have the highest mean wind speeds, and June to August the lightest winds. The dominant wind direction is from the south-west.

== Governance ==
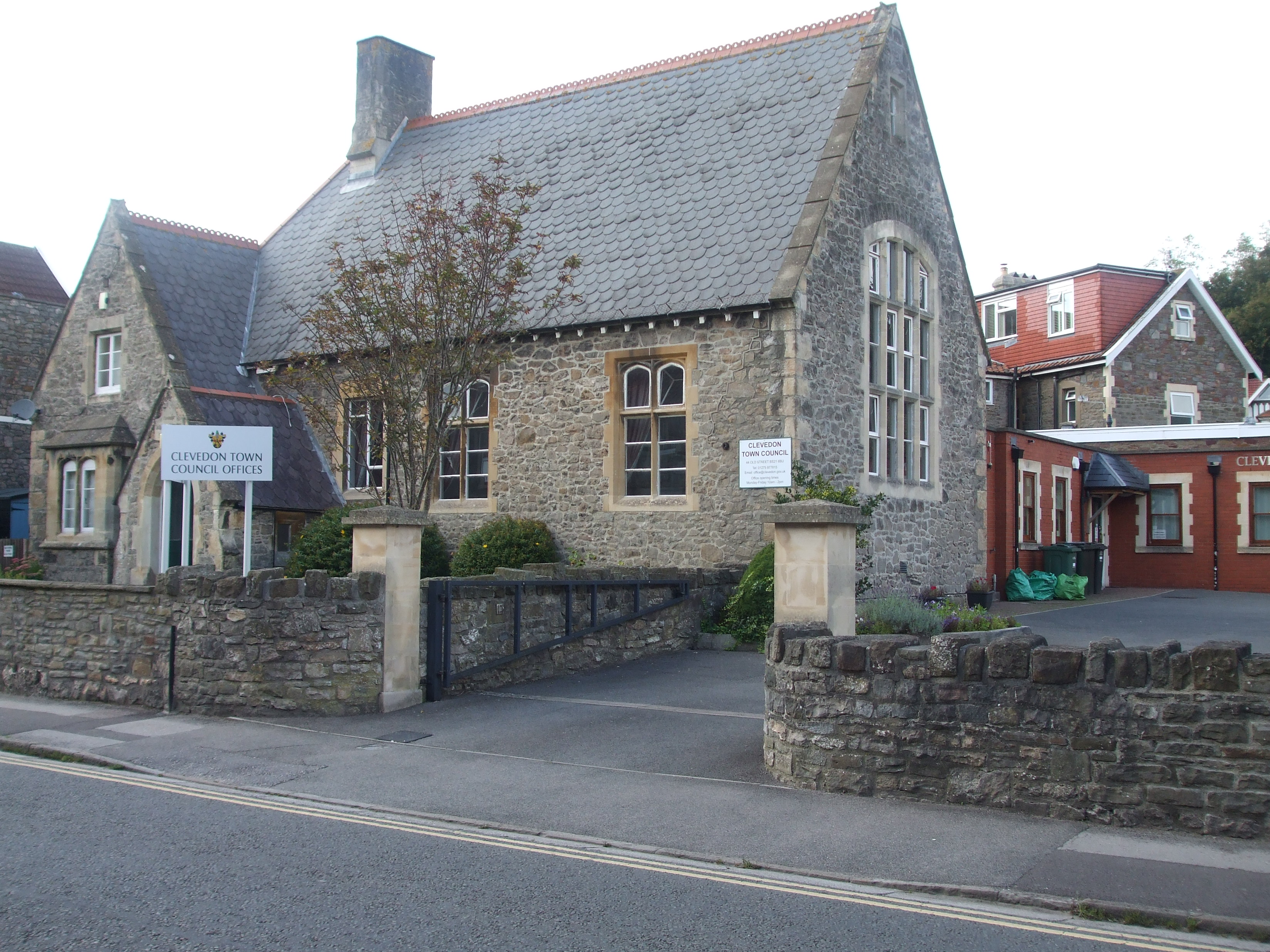
Town Council Offices on Old Street

There are two tiers of local government covering Clevedon, at parish (town) and unitary authority level: Clevedon Town Council and North Somerset Council. The town council is based at the Council Offices at 44 Old Street. The building was previously St Andrew's School, which had been built around 1860.

For national elections, the town forms part of the North Somerset constituency.

=== Administrative history ===
Clevedon was an ancient parish in the Portbury hundred of Somerset. In 1853, the parish was made a local board district, administered by an elected local board. Such districts were reconstituted as urban districts under the Local Government Act 1894.

Clevedon Urban District was abolished in 1974. Its area then became part of the new district of Woodspring in the new county of Avon. A successor parish was created covering the former urban district as part of the 1974 reforms, with its parish council taking the name Clevedon Town Council.

The county of Avon was abolished in 1996. Woodspring was then renamed North Somerset, and its council also took on county council functions, making it a unitary authority. For ceremonial purposes, the district was restored to Somerset at the same time.

== Economy ==
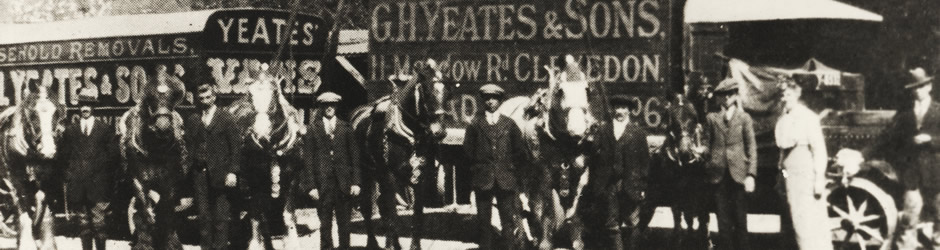
Horse and carts used by Yeates Removals in 1910

Clevedon has light industry, mainly on industrial estates such as Hither Green, near the M5 motorway junction. It is also a dormitory town for Bristol. The Clerical Medical pensions and investments group, part of HBOS, was based in the town on the former site of the Hales Cakes factory, but after its closure in 2009, North Somerset Council bought the Castlewood offices for their own use. Percy Daniel & Co are organ builders, whose work includes that of Brentwood Cathedral.

Yeates Removals was set up in 1910, using horses and carts for general haulage in Clevedon and surrounding areas. The company has always been run by family members.

== Landmarks ==
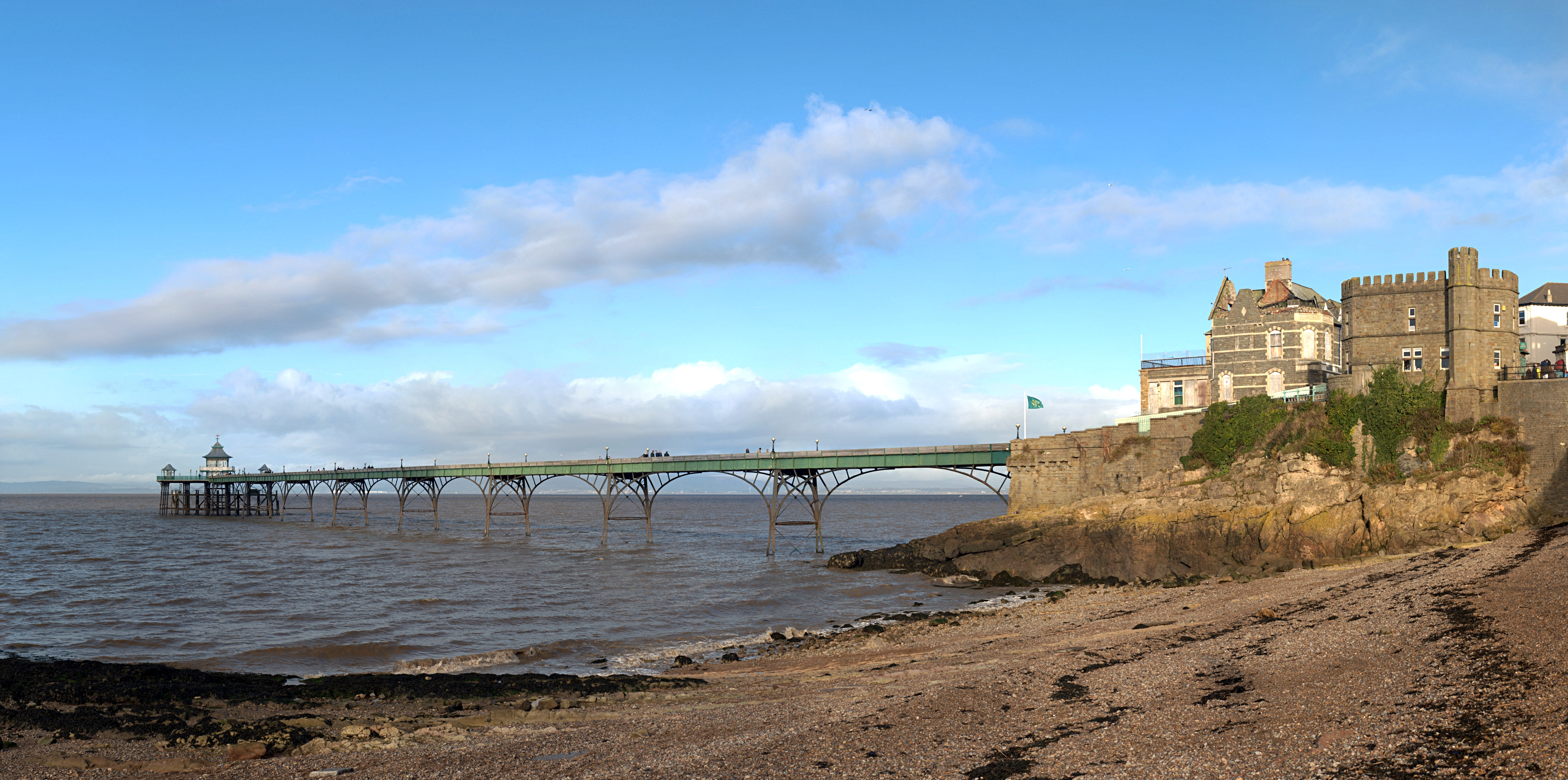
Clevedon Pier and the Severn estuary. Wales can be seen on the horizon

Clevedon Court is on Court Hill, east of the town centre and close to the Bristol road. It is one of the few remaining 14th-century manorial halls in England, built by Sir John de Clevedon in about 1320. Since the early 18th century, the house was owned by the Elton family, who did much building work on the house and many improvements in the town. Although the house now belongs to the National Trust, the associated estates are still owned by the family. Sir Edmund Elton (1846–1920) was a potter at the Clevedon Elton Sunflower Pottery, who produced unusually shaped ware in richly coloured glazes, including a gold glaze of his own invention.

Walton Castle is a 17th-century fort on Castle Hill that overlooks the Walton St Mary area at the northern end of Clevedon, built sometime between 1615 and 1620. It was designed as a hunting lodge for Lord Poulett, a Somerset MP. The English Civil War saw the decline of Poulett's fortunes, and by 1791 the castle was derelict and being used as a dairy by a local farmer. In 1978, the castle was purchased for £1 by Martin Sessions-Hodge, who restored the building to its former glory.

The Royal Pier Hotel is a Grade II listed building next to the pier. It was built in 1823 by Thomas Hollyman, and originally called The Rock House. In 1868, the building was expanded by the local architect Hans Price and renamed Rock House & Royal Pier Hotel, later shortened to Royal Pier Hotel. After its closure in 2001 the building fell into disrepair, but it has since been converted into luxury apartments.

Clevedon Pier opened on Easter Monday 1869. It is now one of the earliest UK examples of a Victorian pier still in existence. After a set of legs collapsed during an insurance load check on 17 October 1970, it fell into disrepair until 1985, when it was dismantled, taken to Portishead dock for restoration, and rebuilt in 1986. In 2001, it was upgraded to a Grade I listed building, The paddle steamer Waverley and motor vessel Balmoral offer day trips by sea from Clevedon Pier to points along the Bristol Channel and Severn estuary. Adjoining the pier is the contemporary Toll House, built in the style of a folly castle and provided to house the pier-master.

Clevedon clock tower in the town centre is decorated with "Elton ware". It was completed in 1898 and donated by Sir Edmund Elton to mark Queen Victoria's Diamond Jubilee. The Curzon cinema dates from 1912, for Victor Cox, and is one of the world's oldest purpose-built, continuously operated cinemas.

Clevedon Marine Lake opened in 1929. After becoming derelict and disused after the 1960s, it was restored in 2015 with funding from the Heritage Lottery Fund.

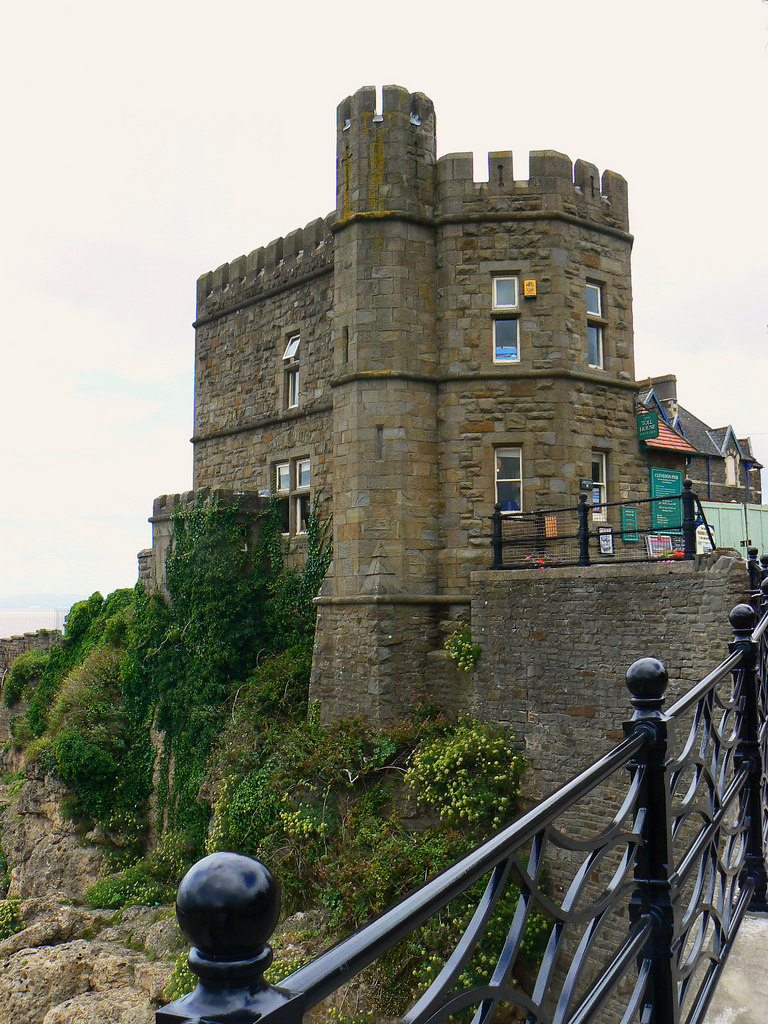
Toll House

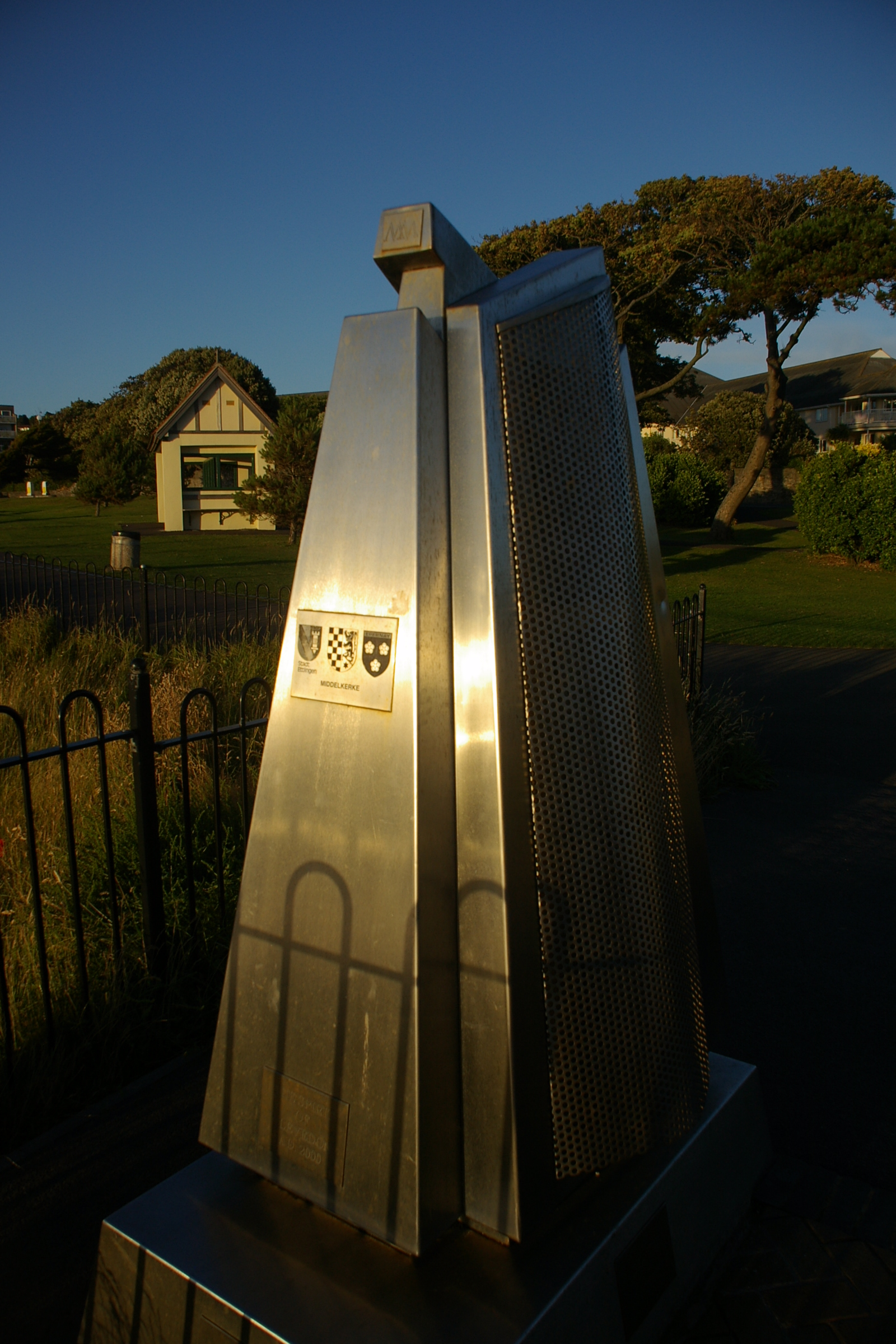
Millennium monument

The market hall on Alexandra Road was designed by the local architect Hans Price. A monument known as the "Spirit of Clevedon" was erected near the seafront to mark the Millennium. Unveiled in June 2000, the 5 ft (1.5 m) sculpture cost £9,000. It was designed by local citizens and includes panels and plaques representing the town's history and community. Its base contains a time capsule with information on the town.

== Education ==
Clevedon School is a secondary comprehensive school serving the town and surrounding rural areas, with some 1,200 pupils in years 7 to 11 (Lower School) and 12 to 13 (Upper School or sixth form).

There are six primary schools: Mary Elton Primary School, St John the Evangelist of Bath and Wells Academy Trust Church of England School, All Saints C of E Primary School and St Nicholas's Chantry CEVC Primary School.

Mary Elton (née Stewart of Castle Stewart), the second wife of the Reverend Sir Abraham Elton, endowed local schools in the 19th century: the Mary Elton Primary School in Holland Road, Clevedon, is named after her.

St John's the Evangelist Primary School was formerly based on the current site of Clevedon Library. It moved to its current site on the Fosseway in 1991 and was opened by Anne, Princess Royal.

Yeo Moor Primary School, opened on 19 April 2010, amalgamated infant and junior schools that shared the site. The footballer Jack Butland attended Yeo Moor School and Clevedon School.

St Brandon's School was an independent boarding school until 1991 and a co-educational infant and junior school until 2004.

A drama company, Take The Lead, from Clevedon School, has put on productions in the town.

== Religious sites ==
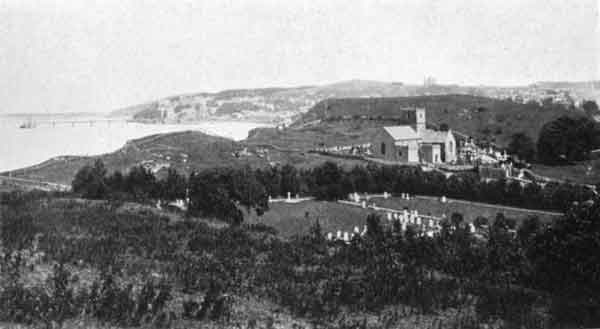
Church of St Andrew, circa 1907

There are several churches serving the town, including St. Andrew's church, built in the 13th century although there are thought to be Saxon foundations under the present building. It is the burial place of Arthur Hallam, subject of the poem In Memoriam A. H. H. by his friend Alfred, Lord Tennyson.

The Church of St John was built in 1876–1878, by William Butterfield for Sir Arthur Elton. The Church of All Saints was built in 1861 by C E Giles. The tower of Christ Church, on Chapel Hill, is an important landmark in Clevedon, erected in 1838–1839 to designs by Thomas Rickman, in an early 14th-century style.

The Copse Road Chapel is an Independent Evangelical Church, built in 1851 and attributed to Foster and Wood of Bristol, which also designed the United Reformed Church in Hill Road. The Roman Catholic Church of the Immaculate Conception, built 1886–87, is served by the Franciscan order.

== Railways ==
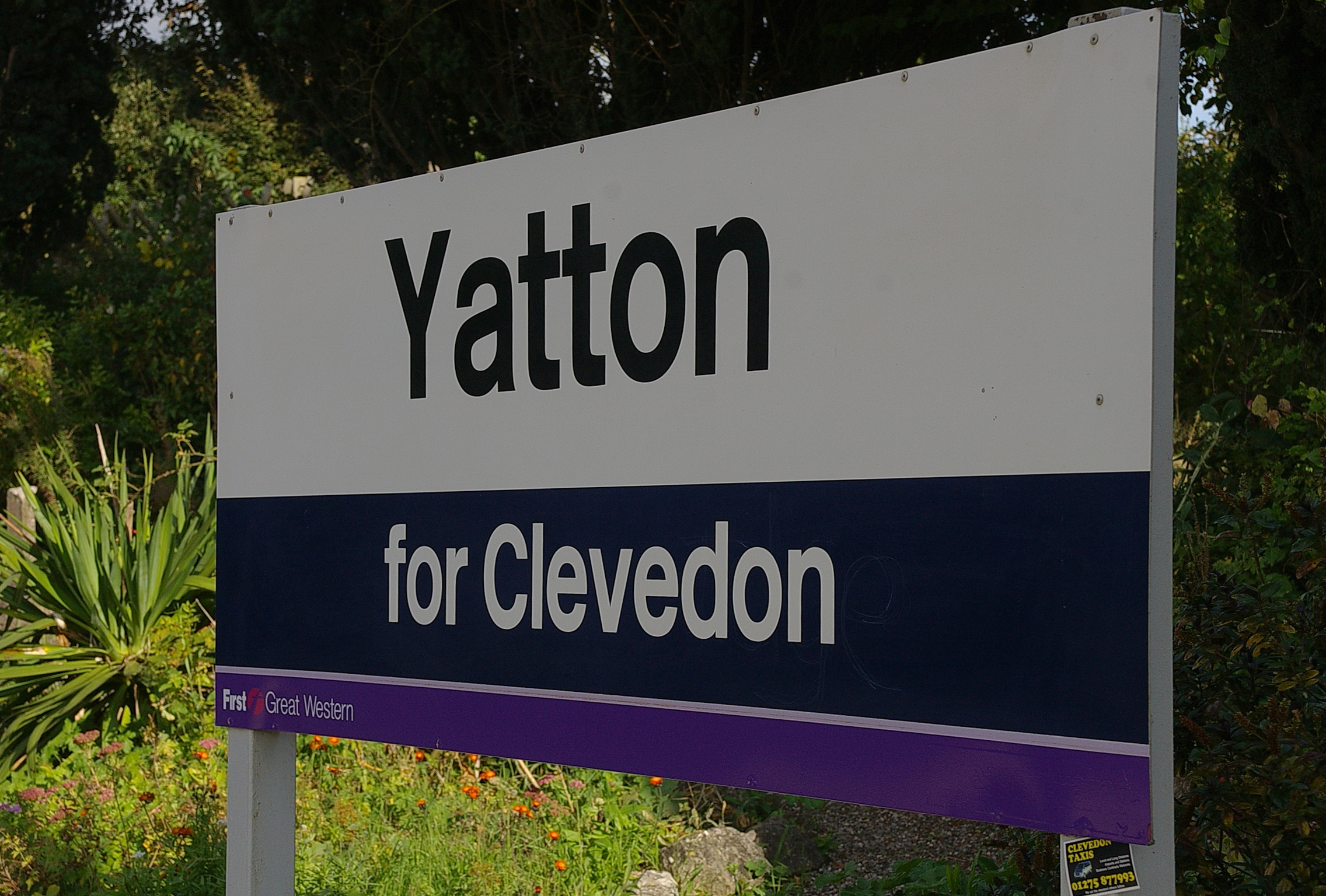
Station name boards note Yatton is "for Clevedon". Following the closure of the Clevedon Branch Line in 1966, Yatton is Clevedon's closest station.

The nearest railway station is Yatton on the Bristol to Exeter line, served by Great Western Railway. Clevedon was previously served by a branch line from Yatton, which closed in 1966. The site of the town station is now called the Triangle or Queen's Square. The Weston, Clevedon and Portishead Light Railway also served the town.

== Sanitation ==
In 1863, Sir Arthur Elton, 7th Baronet of Clevedon Court was largely responsible for the creation of the Clevedon Waterworks Company, which had built the first waterworks and sewage treatment works in Clevedon by 1867. Features included reservoirs to the north of Dial Hill and Old Street pumping station. As the population increased, the waterworks proved inadequate and a new pumping station was created on Tickenham Road in 1901, some 1.2 miles (2 km) to the north-east. The new site could be seen from Clevedon Court, and the 8th Baronet, Sir Edmund Elton, took exception to the designs of the engineer James Mansergh. The Waterworks Company employed the architect Henry Dare Bryan to improve the appearance of the buildings, which included the pumping station, a coal shed and store, a lodge for the foreman, and the boundary wall and gates. The original pumping station was reused as a fire station.

The new pumping station contained a vertical triple-expansion engine manufactured by the Scottish company Glenfield and Kennedy. This was upgraded to a Marshal horizontal compound engine in 1916, in turn replaced in 1938, when a steam turbine was fitted. The boiler house, engine house and chimney are grade II listed, as largely unaltered buildings in Domestic Revival style, with the interior retaining its glazed tiling and elaborate roof trusses, although the machinery has been replaced by modern equipment, and the site is still operational. Clevedon Waterworks Company were one of the first of the smaller waterworks in the region to amalgamate with Bristol Water, which occurred on 1 January 1953.

At the pump house, water is drawn from a well which is 110 feet (33.53 m) deep. The upper 69 feet (21 m) are lined with brick, and the well supplies around 990,000 imperial gallons (4.5 Ml) of water to the public supply network each day.

== Sport ==
The town's location makes watersports a feature. Clevedon Canoe Club at the marine lake facilitates sea paddling trips along the North Somerset coast on the Severn Estuary, and to other sites such as Wye Valley and Woolacombe. Nearby is Clevedon Sailing Club.

Clevedon Cricket Club, founded in 1874, competes in the West of England Premier League.

Clevedon Town Football Club dates back to the late 19th century. It was a founder member of the Western Football League, winning its championship in the 1990s. The club plays at Everyone Active Stadium, formerly Hand Stadium. Another Non-League football club, Clevedon United F.C., plays at Coleridge Vale. Swiss Valley Rangers FC, founded in 2000, are a junior football club, based at Clevedon School, that has teams from ages under 6 to ages under 18.

Clevedon Bowling Club, formed in 1910, has gained several international honours.

Other facilities include Clevedon Golf Club, with a Par 72, 6,500-yard course, Riding Centre, a Rugby Club, and several others.

== Media ==
Local news and television programmes are provided by BBC West and ITV West Country. Television signals are received from the Mendip TV transmitter. Because of its proximity to Wales, BBC Wales and ITV Cymru Wales can also be received from the Wenvoe TV transmitter.

Local radio stations are BBC Radio Bristol, Heart West, Greatest Hits Radio South West (formerly The Breeze) and Radio Clevedon, a community based station.

The town is served by the local newspaper, North Somerset Times.

== Culture ==
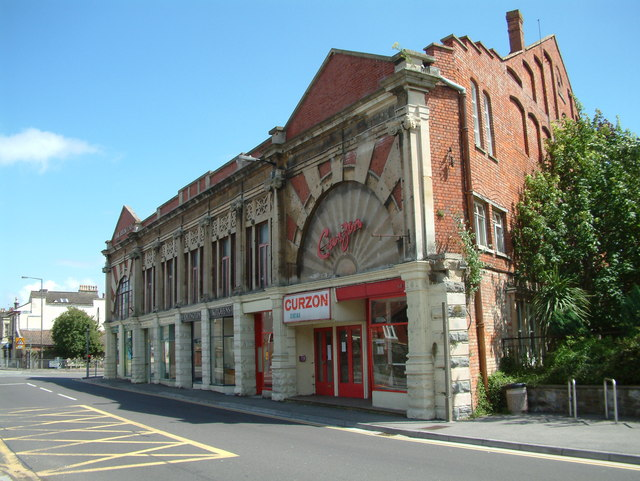
Curzon Cinema, opened on 20 April 1912

Writers linked with the town include Samuel Taylor Coleridge, who spent some months in a cottage in Clevedon, after his marriage to Sara Fricker, William Makepeace Thackeray, a frequent guest of the Elton family at Clevedon Court, and George Gissing (The Odd Women is set here).

The final scene of a 1993 movie, The Remains of the Day, starring Anthony Hopkins, Emma Thompson and Christopher Reeve, refers to Clevedon, where it was filmed. The television movie Cider with Rosie (1998) also has scenes filmed there. Scenes from the 2010 film, Never Let Me Go, starring Keira Knightley were filmed in Clevedon in the summer of 2009. Clevedon has its comic book superhero, Captain Clevedon.

Clevedon has been twinned with Ettlingen, in Baden-Württemberg, Germany, since 1980, Épernay, France, since 1990, and Middelkerke, Belgium, since 1991.

Clevedon, in particular St Andrew's Church, was one of the settings for the town Broadchurch, a detective drama first aired on ITV on 4 March 2013.

== Notable people ==
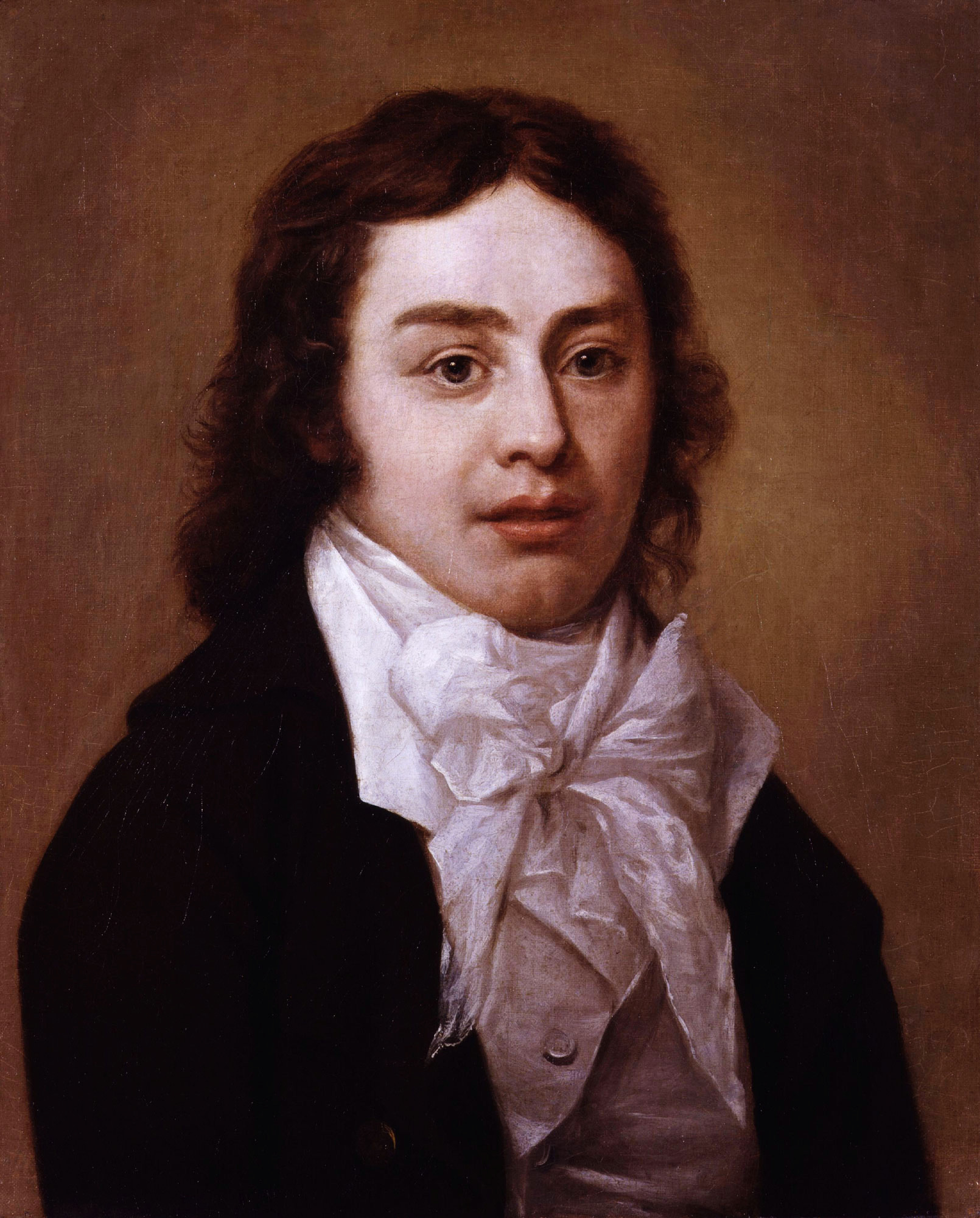
Samuel Taylor Coleridge, 1795

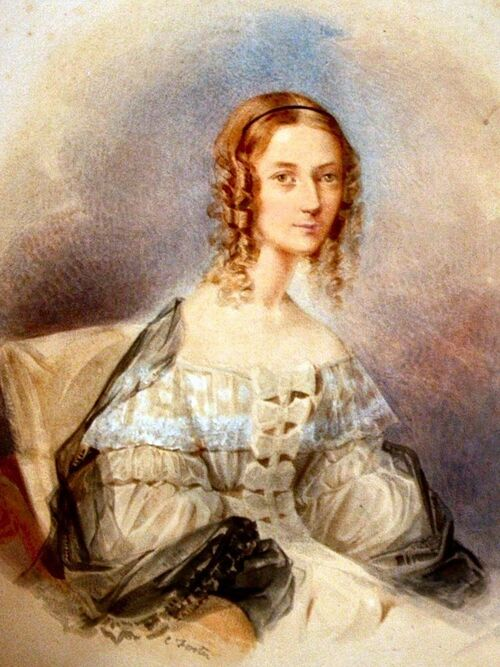
Jane Euphemia Saxby, 1830

In birth date order:

- Edward Tyson (1651–1708), scientist and physician, pioneer of modern comparative anatomy.
- Samuel Taylor Coleridge (1772–1834), poet, literary critic, philosopher, and theologian; founder of the Romantic Movement spent his honeymoon in Clevedon.
- Hartley Coleridge (1796–1849), poet, biographer, essayist and son of Samuel Taylor Coleridge.
- Jane Euphemia Saxby (1811–1898), poet and hymn writer
- Arthur Hallam (1811–1833), poet, subject of Tennyson's elegy In Memoriam A.H.H., buried locally.
- Sir Arthur Elton, 7th Baronet (1818–1884), politician and local benefactor
- Emma Jane Guyton (1825–1887, born Worboise), novelist and editor, died in Clevedon.
- Frances Freeling Broderip (1830–1878), children's writer, died in Clevedon.
- Mortimer Sloper Howell (1841–1925), colonial magistrate and Asiatic scholar
- Sir Edmund Harry Elton (1846–1920), an English inventor and studio potter.
- Edward Raymond Turner (1873–1903), an inventor of colour cinema
- George Eric Rowe Gedye (1890–1970), journalist and foreign correspondent, wrote about the rise of fascism in Germany and Austria.
- Sir Arthur Elton, 10th Baronet (1906–1973), pioneer documentary film maker
- Jan Morris (1926–2020), author, travel writer and The Times journalist who took part in and announced the ascent of Everest in 1953
- Susan Sallis (1929–2020), novelist, of women's fiction, romance and historical fiction.
- Sir Clive Cowdery (born 1963), businessman in insurance and financial services
- Mark Buckingham (born 1966), comic book artist
- Brady Haran (born 1976) YouTube video producer, lives in the town.
- Tuppence Middleton (born 1987), film and TV actress, grew up in Clevedon.
- Luke Spiller (born 1988), lead singer and band member of The Struts grew up in Clevedon.

=== Sport ===
- Richard Arden-Davis (1855–1917), cricketer for Middlesex, and vicar of Clevedon from 1902.
- David Bryant (1931–2020), three-times world outdoors singles bowls champion
- Graham Tripp (1932–2024), county cricketer, played 34 matches for Somerset
- Bob Anderson (born 1947), world professional darts champion in 1988
- Jerry Gill (born 1970), former footballer, played over 500 games.
- Kate Reed (born 1982) British Olympic 10,000 m runner, took part in the 2008 Summer Olympics.
- Jack Butland (born 1993), football goalkeeper, played over 350 games, including 157 for Stoke City and 9 for England
