= Thomas Edmondston Saxby =

Scottish physician and ornithologist (1869-1952)

Thomas Edmondston Saxby, Esq. OBE JP FRFPS (1869–1952) was a Scottish medical doctor, working on Unst, the most northerly of the Shetland Islands, and an ornithologist.

He was a member of a Shetland family with many doctors and naturalists, dating back to the sixteenth century.

== Biography ==
Thomas Edmondston Saxby was born on 9 March 1869 at Unst, Shetland Islands, Scotland.

He was the third son of Jessie Margaret Edmondston (1842-1940) and Henry Linckmeyer Saxby (1836-1873). His mother became a wellknown author, and was a sister of the botanist Thomas Edmondston (1825-1846). His father was a physician and ornithologist. His grandfather Laurence Edmondston (1795-1879) was also a physician and ornithologist.

Thomas E. Saxby went to school at George Watson's College in Edinburgh. Afterwards he studied medicine at the University of Edinburgh and went on to the Royal College of Surgeons of Edinburgh. In 1897 he received the Scottish Triple Qualification. He continued his studies for a short period at St. Mary's Hospital, London and returned to Shetland in 1898.

Thomas Edmondston Saxby married to Julia Maude Furniss (1867-1939) on 4 January 1898. They had four children.

They lived on Halligarth, the family home of Thomas's parents.

From 1898 to 1950 Saxby worked as the only medical doctor on Unst. Apart from caring for the inhabitants of the island, he also served the crews of fishing boats that came to Baltasound.

In World War I Saxby also worked temporarily as an Admiralty Surgeon and Naval Agent.

Like other members of his family Saxby was a naturalist, who published in The Zoologist and The Annals of Scottish Natural History.

Thomas Edmondston Saxby died 11 October 1952 in Baltasound, Unst. He was buried at Halligarth Cemetery, Baltasound, Unst.

== Honors ==
Saxby is said to have been invited to become a court physician to the King of Sweden, but he preferred to work on Unst. For his work among the Swedish fishermen he was created a Knight of the Royal Order of Vasa in 1911 by the Swedish King.

On 10 June 1948 Thomas E. Saxby became an Ordinary Officer of the Civil Division of the Most excellent Order of the British Empire.

== Bibliography ==
- Saxby, T. Edmondston (June 1900). "Ornithological Notes from Shetland". The Zoologist. 4th series, vol. 4 (issue 708, September—section 'Notes and Queries'): 281.
- —— (1900). "Opah at the Shetlands". The Zoologist. 4. 4 (issue 711, September—section 'Notes and Queries'): 434.
- —— (1901). "Ornithological Notes from Shetland". The Zoologist. 4th series, vol 5 (issue 724, October—section 'Notes and Queries'): 391.
- —— (1902). "Notes from the Shetlands". The Zoologist. 4th series, vol 6 (issue 729, March—section 'Notes and Queries'): 112–113.
- —— (1902). "Ornithological Notes from Shetland". The Zoologist. 4. 6 (issue 737, December—section 'Notes and Queries'): 468.
- —— (January 1904). "Occurrences of the Great Grey Shrike (Lanius excubitor) – Shetland". The Annals of Scottish Natural History. 1904 (49): 53.
- —— (July 1904). "On the occurrence of the Hawfinch and other birds in Unst, Shetland". The Annals of Scottish Natural History. 1904 (51): 154–157.
- —— (January 1907). "Bird Notes from North Shetland for 1906". The Annals of Scottish Natural History. 1907 (61): 50.
- —— (September 1917). "Little Bittern in Shetland". The Scottish Naturalist. 1917 (69): 214.

== Sources ==
- An. (29 November 1952). "Obituary: T.E. Saxby, O.B.E., F.R.F.P.S." British Medical Journal. 1952 (2): 1208.
