= Curzon Cinema =

Curzon Cinema could refer to:

- The Curzon Community Cinema, Clevedon, a historically significant cinema in western England
- The (unrelated) Curzon Cinemas cinema chain, specialising in arthouse films
