= Saxby (surname) =

Saxby is an English surname. Notable people with the surname include:

- Alf Saxby (1897–1966), English footballer
- Edward Saxby (1616–1658), English Puritan soldier
- Henry Saxby (1836–1873), English ornithologist
- Jessie Saxby (1842-1840), Scottish writer and folklorist
- John Saxby (1821–1913), British engineer and railway pioneer
- Kerry Saxby (born 1961), Australian race walker
- Robin Saxby (born 1947), British businessman
- Selaine Saxby (born 1970), British politician
- Stephen Martin Saxby (1804–1883), English meteorologist and naval officer
- George Saxby Penfold (1769–1846), English clergyman

Fictional characters:

- Bert Saxby, from James Bond
