= Richard Arden =

Richard Arden may refer to:

- Richard Arden, 3rd Baron Alvanley (1792–1857), British Army officer and peer
- Richard Pepper Arden, 1st Baron Alvanley (1744–1804), British barrister and politician

== See also ==
- Richard Arden-Davis (1855–1917), English cricketer and Anglican clergyman
