= Clevedon Town Hall =

Municipal building in Clevedon, Somerset, England

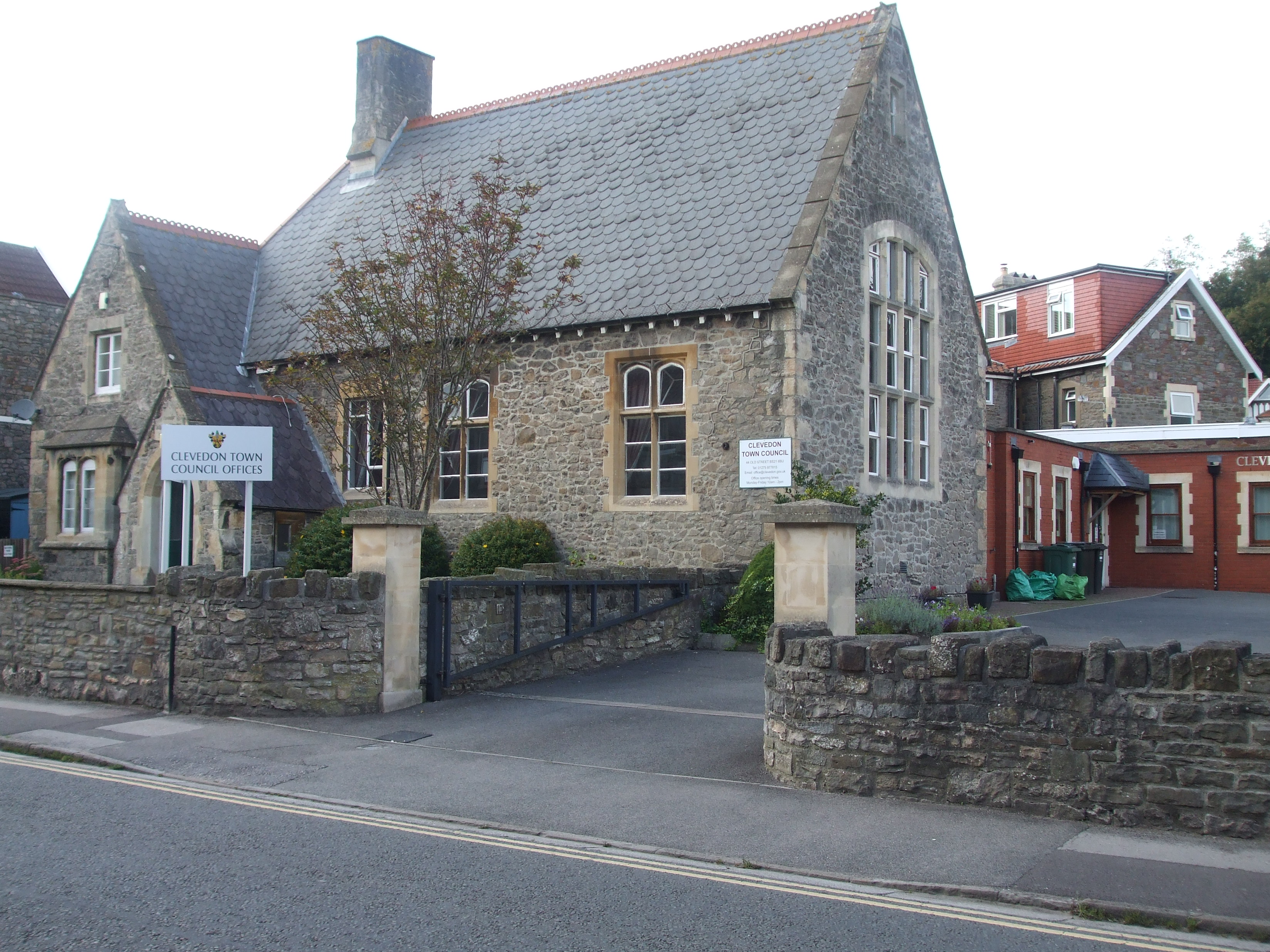
- The building in 2020

- Shown in Somerset
- 51.4372°N 2.8484°W
- Location: Old Street, Clevedon

History
- Built: 1860

Site notes
- Architectural style: Tudor style

Listed Building – Grade II
- Official name: St Andrews Infants School
- Designated: 16 September 1999
- Reference no.: 1113001

Clevedon Town Hall is a municipal building in Old Street in Clevedon, a town in Somerset in England. The building, which was commissioned as a primary school but currently accommodates the offices and meeting place of Clevedon Town Council, is a Grade II listed building.

== History ==
=== The Council House ===
Following significant population growth, largely associated with the town's role as a seaside resort, a local board of health, chaired by Sir Arthur Elton, was appointed in Clevedon in April 1853. In 1894, the local board of health was succeeded by Clevedon Urban District Council. In the 1930s, the council was accommodated in rooms at 12A Hill Road but, its first permanent home was Claremont House on Highdale Road. The house had been commissioned as a summer retreat for the Bristol merchant, George Weare Braikenridge. It was designed in the Gothic Revival style, built in ashlar stone and was completed in the mid-19th century. The council acquired Claremont House, for use as its offices and meeting place, in 1938.

The building, which became known as The Council House, continued to serve as the headquarters of the council for nearly four decades, but ceased to be the local seat of government when Woodspring District Council was formed in Weston-super-Mare in 1974. The council continued to use the building to accommodate its housing services department until, being surplus to requirements, it was sold to a developer, who converted it into apartments in the late 1980s. It is now known as Claremont Hall.

=== The Town Hall ===
The current building was commissioned by the parish vestry at St Andrew's Church, as St Andrew's Primary School. It was designed in the Tudor style, built in rubble masonry and was completed in around 1860. It incorporated two schoolrooms, at right-angles, and a house for the schoolmaster. A small, one-storey extension was added to the rear schoolroom in about 1900.

The school closed in 1995, and, in 1999, the building was grade II listed. In 2001, it was converted into a town hall, with Clevedon Town Council relocating from its former headquarters at Clevedon Village Hall.

== Architecture of the Town Hall ==
The single-storey building is constructed of stone. The design involves an asymmetrical main frontage of four bays facing onto Old Street. The left-hand bay, which is gabled, is projected forward and fenestrated by a bi-partite mullioned window on the ground floor and by a casement window on the attic floor. There is a gabled porch to the right of the first bay and the other bays are fenestrated with bi-partite mullioned and transomed windows with pointed heads. The extension to the rear schoolroom is in brick, while its roof has visible scissor-braced trusses.
