= Saxby =

Saxby may refer to:

== People ==
- Saxby (surname)
- Saxby Chambliss (born 1943), American Republican Senator

== Places ==
=== Australia ===
- Saxby, Queensland, an outback rural locality
- Saxby River, in North West Queensland
- Saxby County, Queensland

=== England ===
- Saxby, Leicestershire
- Saxby, Lincolnshire,
- Saxby, West Sussex, a location
- Saxby All Saints, North Lincolnshire

=== Estonia ===
- Saxby, Estonia, village in Vormsi Parish, Lääne County,

== Other uses ==
- 1869 Saxby Gale, a tropical cyclone which struck eastern Canada's Bay of Fundy
- Saxby Bros Ltd, a food manufacturer in England
- Saxbys Coffee, a franchise of coffeehouses
