= Clevedon School =

Location
- Valley Road, BS21 6AH; Clevedon, North Somerset; England; 51°26′51″N 2°50′34″W

Information
- Type: Academy
- Motto: Be Kind, Be Brilliant
- Established: 1962
- Trust: Futura Learning Partnership
- Specialist: Language College
- Department for Education URN: 137884 Tables
- Ofsted: Reports
- Head teacher: Jim Smith
- Age: 11 to 18
- Enrolment: 1,173
- Houses: Conygar; Walton; Marine; Valley
- Website: http://www.clevedonschool.org.uk/

Clevedon School, formerly known as Clevedon Community School, is a coeducational secondary school located in Clevedon, North Somerset, England. It has over 1350 pupils, in years 7 to 11 in the Lower School and 12 to 13 in the Upper School or sixth form. The school recently regained its Language College status. As of 2024 the headteacher is Jim Smith. The school was part of the Clevedon Learning Trust, a Multi-Academy Trust formed on 1 January 2015 by CEO John Wells. As of 1 March 2023, Clevedon Learning Trust merged with Futura Learning Partnership, with schools in Bristol, North Somerset and Somerset.

Within the school grounds, the school operates Clevedon School Sports Centre, which has a large sports hall, a gymnasium, a dance studio, two squash courts, a running track, netball/tennis courts, an all-weather pitch as well as two large fields being split in two by Holly Lane. The sports centre is home to clubs including Swiss Valley Rangers FC and North Somerset Athletics Club.

The school was built in 1962 and has a mixture of old and new buildings. Much of the school site still has the old buildings such as the main block, some refurbished such as the Maths Block (refurbished in 2014) and some modern buildings such as the Sixth Form Block and Science Block (recently renamed The Colin Bennet Science Centre). The school suffered from a minor fire within the art block on 17 March 2023, which took hold after school. It has been reported that all staff, students and visitors on site at the time were safely accounted for, and with the swift actions from staff the damage was contained to one classroom. The school's library, Xenia, deriving from the Greek meaning of hospitality, opened in 2022.

Clevedon School appeared in the ITV crime drama, Broadchurch, as South Wessex Secondary School; some of the students also appeared in the programme.

== HAAC & The Learning Village ==
In September 2023, following a structural survey of the school estate, 22 classrooms had to close within the main tower building because of safety issued with a type of concrete known as HACC. Whilst Clevedon School was cleared with RAAC in May 2023, a further survey separate to RAAC identified the issues with the 62 year old building.

Following the main building's closure, the school made use of office spaces, the canteen and the squash courts as temporary classrooms. In order to offer full provision in the longer term, the school established a "Learning Village", a marquee structure on the field with 18 classrooms fully equipped with screens, computers, heating and classroom furniture. The Learning Village was opened on 30 October 2023, with headteacher Jim Smith stating to local media "It really does feel like a new chapter for us. As staff, early on Monday morning, we took the opportunity to almost relaunch the school. To have the stability back for us has been exceptionally well-received, and there was a sense of celebration that we've got the buildings built, and open, and that lessons have taken place successfully."

In May 2025, plans for a replacement school building were approved by North Somerset Council.

== House system ==
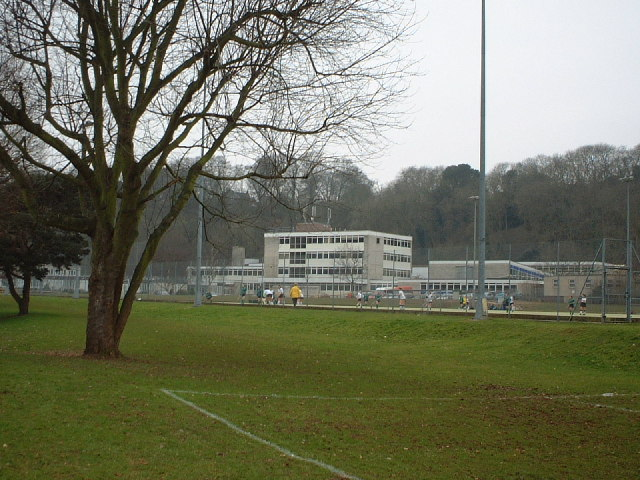
Clevedon School and playing fields

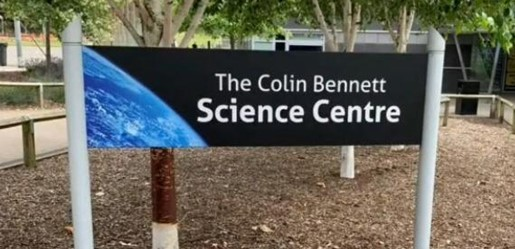
Clevedon School Science Block (renamed as Colin Bennett Science Centre in 2021 due to his Virgin Galactic achievements)

The house system, which came into being in September 2006, consists of four houses: Conygar (red), Marine (blue), Valley (green) and Walton (yellow). All pupils and most staff belong to one of the four houses. The houses' names are derived from road names in Clevedon.

Formerly, (until 2006) the house system had also divided the pupils and teachers into four houses, which were named after famous Clevedon residents and visitors: Arthur Hallam (red), William Makepeace Thackeray (green), Alfred Tennyson, 1st Baron Tennyson (blue) and Samuel Taylor Coleridge (yellow).

== Vertical tutoring ==
At Clevedon School each house consists of ten tutor groups with a mix of students from years 7 to 11. In Sixth Form, each house consists of two tutor groups for Year 12 and 13. Each tutor group has around 4 to 6 students from each year group.

== School performance ==
Both value-added and GCSE results are very good. Recent A/AS level results (2022 and 2023) have also been good, when compared to schools in the area.

== Performing arts ==
The school has a Youth Theatre, which in 2022 put on a performance of Chicken!, a play about road safety by Mark Wheeller.

== Notable alumni ==
- Huw Bennett, Rugby International.
- Jack Butland, International Footballer.
- Nathan Catt, Rugby player
- Kate Reed, Olympian.
