= Graham Tripp =

English cricketer (1932–2024)

Personal information
- Full name: Graham Malcolm Tripp
- Born: 29 June 1932; Clevedon, Somerset, England
- Died: 1 January 2024 (aged 91)
- Batting: Right-handed
- Role: Batsman

Domestic team information
- Years: Team
- 1955–1959: Somerset
- FC debut: 15 June 1955 Somerset v South Africans
- Last FC: 24 July 1959 Somerset v Hampshire

Career statistics
Competition	First-class
Matches	34
Runs scored	700
Batting average	12.72
100s/50s	0/2
Top score	62
Balls bowled	7
Wickets	0
Bowling average	–
5 wickets in innings	–
10 wickets in match	–
Best bowling	–
Catches/stumpings	29/–
- Source: CricketArchive, 9 June 2008

Graham Malcolm Tripp (29 June 1932 – 1 January 2024) was an English cricketer who played first-class cricket for Somerset in the 1950s. He was born at Clevedon in Somerset on 29 June 1932.

Tripp was a right-handed middle-order batsman who made a lot of runs for Somerset's second eleven but never quite succeeded in making the step up to first-class cricket. He appeared in 34 first-class matches in five seasons, but his career average as a batsman was only 12 and he reached 50 in an innings only twice.

Tripp made his debut for Somerset against the South Africans in 1955, making 2 and 13. It was enough, in a weak batting side, to keep him in the team for the next two matches, but he failed to reach double figures in either.

In 1956, he played fairly regularly in mid-season, but his only 50 – exactly 50 – came in a losing cause when promoted to open the second innings batting against Derbyshire. His 217 runs in the season at an average of 15.50 was his highest aggregate for any season.

Tripp's highest score came in 1957: batting at No 3, he made 62 against Essex at Colchester, "driving and cutting attractively", said Wisden. But the rest of the season produced only 76 further runs in 17 innings and he finished with an average of only eight runs per innings.

In both the 1958 and 1959 seasons, Tripp was called into the Somerset team for half a dozen matches, but he failed to pass 50 and only in his last season, 1959, did he suggest any consistency. He left the Somerset staff at the end of the 1959 season.

Despite the relative lack of success at first-class level, Tripp was a heavy scorer for Somerset's second eleven in both the Minor Counties and Second Eleven Championship competitions, heading the county's averages in 1957 and 1959. After leaving Somerset, he played Minor Counties cricket for Devon.

Tripp died on 1 January 2024, at the age of 91.
