= Susan Sallis =

British novelist (1929-2020

- Born: Susan Diana Hill; 7 November 1929
- Died: June 10, 2020 (aged 90)
- Occupation: novelist
- Writing career
- Pen name: Susan Meadmore

Susan Diana Sallis (7 November 1929 – 10 June 2020) was a British novelist. She wrote women's fiction, romance, family sagas, historical fiction and books for children and teenagers. Some of her books were best-sellers. She also published as Susan Meadmore.

== Early life and education ==
Born Susan Hill, she grew up in Gloucester and attended Denmark Road High School. Her father worked on the railways.

== Career ==
Sallis started to write aged 28. She went on a writing course but found it "soul-destroying", and at first her work was rejected when she submitted it to women's magazines. She then had stories accepted by Woman's Realm. Later, she went to St Matthias, Bristol to train as a teacher. She enjoyed learning about children's literature on her course, and, aged 39, started to write novels. She also worked as a primary school teacher between 1969 and 1974.

Sallis wrote more than twenty novels, and her books sold over a million copies. Her books were categorised in The Bookseller as "major sellers". Searching for Tilly (2007) was in the top ten mass-market sellers. Rachel's Secret (2008) sold 65,000 copies in its first year. Sarah Broadhurst, writing in The Bookseller in 1999, said "She broke through last year with Come Rain or Shine, and although the bulk of her sales are in W H Smith and mixed multiples, she deserves to have bookshop sales too. She is a sophisticated, sensitive writer, and to expand her market Transworld is concentrating on press and radio profiles alongside the normal marketing strategies".

Several of her books for children and teenagers are about children with disabilities. Sweet Frannie (1981), about a sixteen-year-old who uses a wheelchair and is dying, was described in a review in the Coventry Evening Telegraph as "a tearjerker with guts". It won an American Library Award, and was a finalist for the Young Observer Award. A review in the English Journal in 1981 said "This book is one of the best of its kind". The critic Lois Keith notes that it "was very well received when it was published and for at least the next ten years it was presented as a new, positive way of describing the lives of young disabled people in fiction", but that the positive portrayal of Frannie is undermined by the disgust she feels about her own body and other disabled people. An Open Mind, also about disability, was said at the time to have "Melodramatic dialogue and situations".

Sallis often used Gloucestershire, Cornwall and the West Country as locations for her novels. Her Rising Family Quartet was based on stories of her mother's family.

She said of her writing, "It’s become a kind of life role which I wouldn’t know how to replace. Writing earns me my place on earth, if you like".

Some of her papers are held at the University of Southern Mississippi, in the de Grummond Children's Literature Collection.

== Personal life ==
Sallis married Brian, and they moved to Birmingham because of his job; like her father, he worked on the railways. They moved to Clevedon in Somerset in the early 1960s, and remained living there; they had three children. Sallis died on June 10, 2020.

== Selected works ==
=== The Rising Family Quartet ===
- A Scattering of Daisies (1984)
- The Daffodils of Newent (1985)
- Bluebell Windows (1987)
- Rosemary for Remembrance (1987)

=== Books for children and teenagers ===
- An Open Mind (1978)
- Sweet Frannie (1981), originally published in 1978 as Only Love

=== Other novels ===
- Troubled Waters (1975)
- Four Weeks in Venice (1978)
- Summer Visitors (1988)
- By Sun and Candlelight (1990)
- Daughters of the Moon (1993)
- Come Rain or Shine (1998)
- Sea of Dreams (2001)
- The Pumpkin Coach (2004)
- Searching for Tilly (2007)
- Rachel's Secret (2008)
- The Sweetest Thing (2010)

== As Susan Meadmore ==
- Behind the Mask (1980)
- Thunder in the Hills (1981), originally published in 1979 as A Time for Everything
- Mary Mary (1982)
