= Clive Cowdery =

English businessman and philanthropist (born 1963)

Sir Clive Cowdery
- Born: 26 May 1963 (age 63); Bristol, England
- Education: Clevedon Comprehensive School
- Occupation: Businessman
- Known for: Founder of Resolution, a global life insurance group
- Children: 6

Sir Clive Cowdery (born 26 May 1963) is an English businessman and philanthropist who made a personal fortune in the insurance industry, founding two FTSE 100 insurers and a third insurer which was sold to Nippon Life for $8.2bn in October 2025, which represented 77% of the outstanding shares not yet owned by Nippon Life, valuing the business at $10.6bn. Cowdery has since donated large amounts to charity, including the Resolution Foundation which he founded in 2005.

== Early life ==
Born of Anglo Danish parentage in Bristol, England, in 1963, he is the second of five siblings. He was educated at Clevedon Comprehensive School (now Clevedon Community School), and earned three O-levels and no A-levels.

== Career ==
Clive's career as a leading life insurance executive and entrepreneur has encompassed start-ups and large businesses across markets in the United Kingdom, Europe, the United States and Asia.

From 1998 to 2003, Cowdery was chairman and chief executive of General Electric Insurance Holdings, with operations in 12 countries in Europe.

In 2003, Cowdery founded his first business under the Resolution brand, which invests in life insurance consolidation. Since then, Cowdery's Resolution companies have deployed over US$20 billion of equity in the acquisition, reinsurance, consolidation and management of life insurance companies. Together, these companies have served the needs of c.15 million policyholders while managing over US$375 billion of assets.

His first Resolution vehicle consolidated four major UK closed life insurance companies from Royal Sun Alliance, Swiss Life, Britannic and Santander (Abbey National Life). The FTSE100 insurer was sold to Pearl Group in 2008.

His second Resolution vehicle merged FTSE 100 insurer Friends Provident with AXA's UK life business and other assets. The company was sold to Aviva in 2015 for £5.2 billion.

These two completed projects made significant total returns for shareholders.

In 2018, Cowdery founded Resolution Life, a global life insurance group with the specialist model focusing on the acquisition and management of life insurance companies and portfolios of existing life insurance policies. Prior to the sale to Nippon Life, Resolution Life, managed c.$90 billion of assets with portfolios and reinsurance treaties across the United States, Australia, New Zealand, Europe, the United Kingdom and Asia.

In Australasia, Resolution Life created a specialist life insurance business focussed specifically on the needs of existing customers rather than the promotion of new policies through the acquisition and integration of a number of businesses. These included the US$2.1 billion acquisition of AMP Limited's life insurance business, AMP Life; AIA Australia's superannuation and investment life insurance business in July 2023; and the NZ$410 million acquisition of Asteron Life New Zealand from Suncorp Group Limited in February 2025.

In addition, Resolution Life operates a global reinsurance business in Bermuda.

In October 2025, Resolution Life was acquired by Nippon Life. Cowdery remains its executive chairman.

As part of the transaction, Resolution Life Australasia and Nippon Life's Australian company, MLC, merged to form Acenda Group, a new entity in the Asia-Pacific insurance market.

According to a Bloomberg article in 2025 his net worth was estimated at £200 million.

== Charitable works ==
Since formation of his Resolution vehicles Cowdery has devoted half of all proceeds to charity. The Resolution Foundation, an independent social and economic research organisation set up by Cowdery in 2005, is considered to be one of Britain's leading authorities on low earners and the policy responses required to lift their living standards.

== Other professional interests ==
Cowdery is the owner of Resolution Media which invests in media assets and is Publisher of the magazine Prospect, a current affairs magazine. Along with George Soros, he was an early funder and served as a member of the governing council of The Institute for New Economic Thinking and, until February 2021, he was also a founder and director of Best for Britain, a group campaigning to stop Brexit.

In April 2025, Cowdery acquired an equity stake in The Observer and joined the media outlet's board.

== Personal life ==
Cowdery lives in London and has six children.

Cowdery was knighted in the 2016 New Year Honours for services to children and social mobility.
