= Clevedon Shore =

Protected area in Somerset, England

- Site of Special Scientific Interest
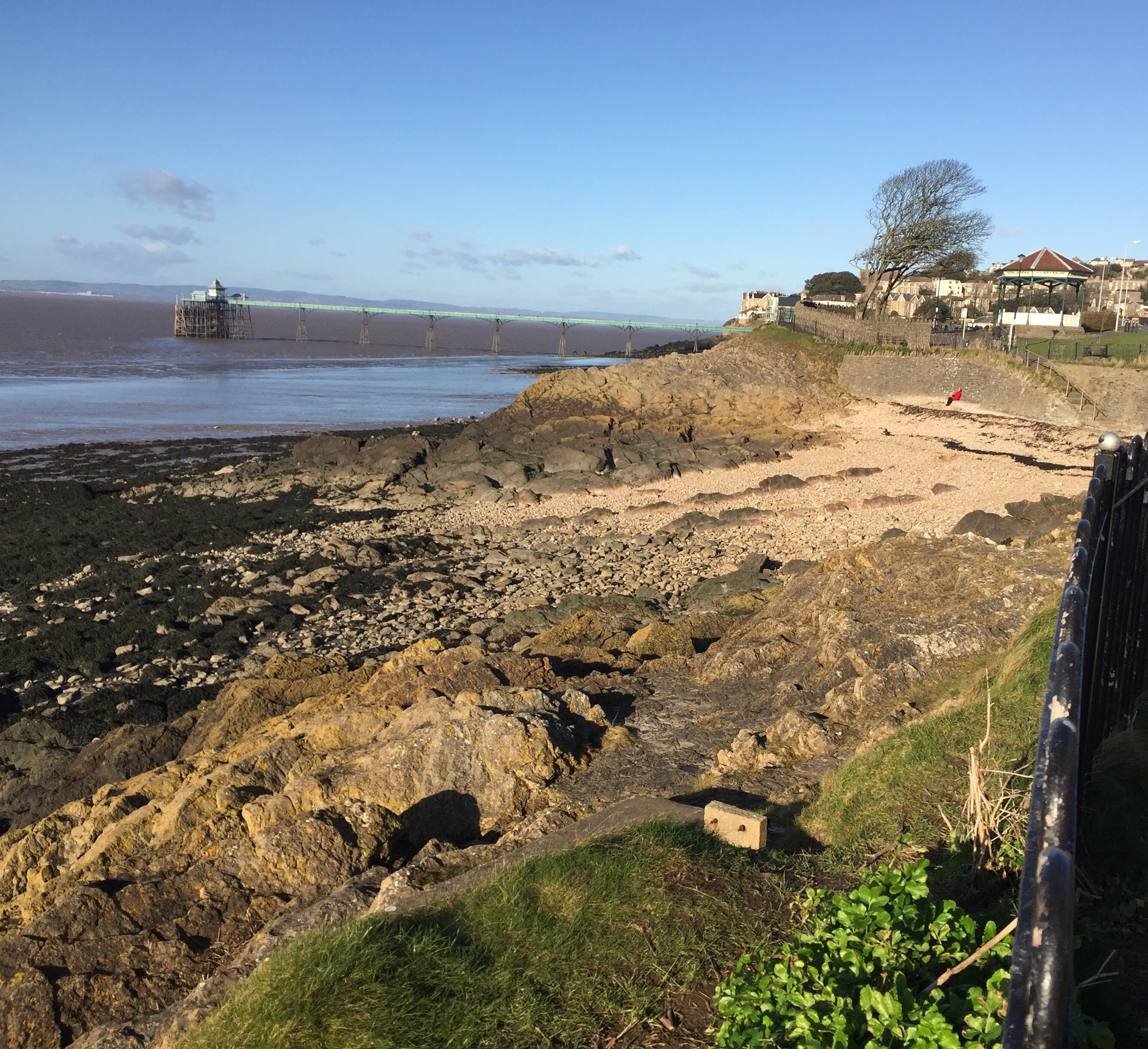

- Location within Somerset
- Location of Clevedon Shore.
- Area of search: North Somerset
- Grid reference: ST402719
- Coordinates: 51.44292°N 2.86181°W
- Interest: Geological
- Area: 0.94 acres (0.0038 km^{2}; 0.00147 sq mi)
- Notification date: 1991

Clevedon Shore (grid reference ST402719) is a 0.38 hectare geological Site of Special Scientific Interest adjacent to the Severn Estuary at Clevedon, North Somerset, notified in 1991.

It is the side of a mineralised fault, which runs east-west adjacent to the pier, and forms a small cliff feature in dolomitic conglomerate on the north side of Clevedon Beach, containing cream to pink baryte together with sulphides. The minerals identified at the site include: haematite, chalcopyrite, tennantite, galena, tetrahedrite, bornite, pyrite, marcasite, enargite and sphalerite. Secondary alteration of this assemblage has produced idaite, Covellite and other Copper sulphides.

The site is listed as a Geological Conservation Review site as several of the minerals found here are rare, in particular the beudantite. The presence of copper and arsenic is unusual for the Mendip district.
