= Jane Euphemia Saxby =

British hymn writer (1811–1898)

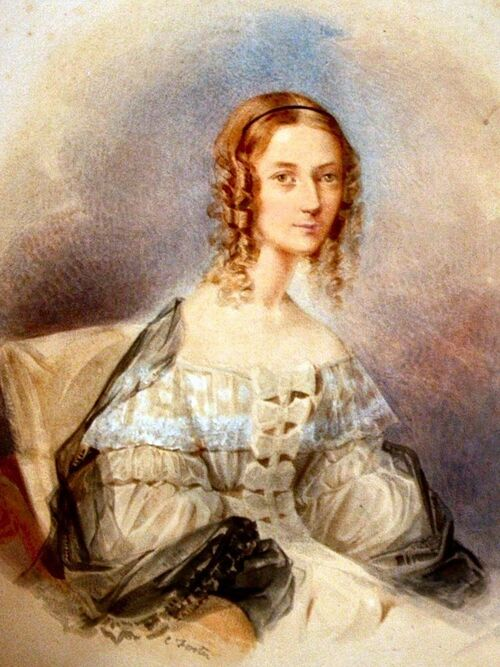
- Jane Euphemia Browne by (maybe) C Forston
- Born: 27 January 1811
- Died: 25 March 1898 (aged 87)
- Occupation: Writer
- Spouse(s): Stephen Saxby

Jane Euphemia Saxby (27 January 1811 – 25 March 1898) was a British hymn writer.

== Life ==
Jane Euphemia Browne was born on 27 January 1811, the daughter of William Browne of Tallantire Hall, Cumberland. In 1865, she married the Rev. Stephen H. Saxby of East Clevedon, Somersetshire. Her husband was the vicar of All Saints church and, with his brother, was an amateur ornithologist.

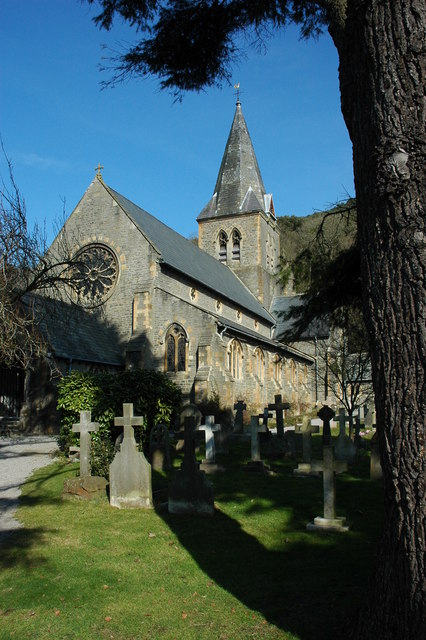
All Saints' Church in East Clevedon

Her first volume of verse was the collection The Dove on the Cross (1849), which included the hymns "Father, into Thy loving hands", "O Holy Ghost, the Comforter", "Show me the way, O Lord", and "Thou God of love, beneath Thy sheltering wings". Nicholas Smith remarks that "Show me the way, O Lord" was the best of Saxby's poems in her first collection, and this poem is included in his Songs from the Hearts of Women: One Hundred Famous Hymns and Their Writers (1903). Another collection, The Voice of the Bird (1875), included the hymn "O Jesus Christ, the holy One".

Her collection of children's verse, Aunt Effie's Gift to the Nursery (1876), was illustrated by Hablot Knight Brown. She may have written it for the children of her sister Caroline, who married Charles Shore, 2nd Baron Teignmouth. In the past, the book has been mistakenly attributed to Ann Hawkshaw.

She also wrote a novel, Sam Bolton's Cottage and What Kept His Wife from the Church (1865).

Jane Euphemia Saxby died on 25 March 1898.

== Bibliography ==
- The Dove on the Cross (1849)
- Sam Bolton's Cottage and What Kept His Wife from the Church (1865)
- The Voice of the Bird (1875)
- Aunt Effie’s Gift to the Nursery (1876)
