= William Alexander Clouston =

Scottish folklorist (1843–1896)

William Alexander Clouston (1843 – 23 October 1896) was a Scottish 19th century folklorist from Orkney.

A Supplement to Alliborne's Dictionary (1891, pp. 349–350), as quoted in Folklore, gives the following biographical information:

b. 1843, at Stromness, Orkney Islands, of an old Norse family, in early life was engaged in commercial pursuits in Glasgow and London, but relinquished these to engage in journalism and literature; he edited several Scotch provincial newspapers, 1871-79, and is a writer for the Glasgow Herald, Evening Times, &c. He has given particular attention to Oriental fiction and folklore, and contributed to Sir R. F. Burton's "Supplemental Arabian Nights" analogues and variants of some of the tales in vols. I-III.

== Bibliography ==
- Popular Tales and Fictions their Migrations and Transformations, William Blackwood and Sons, Edinburgh and London, 1887
- A Group of Eastern Romances and Stories, Privately Printed, 1889.
- Arabian Poetry for English Readers
- Flowers from a Persian Garden and Other Papers
- Book of Wise Sayings: Selected Largely from Eastern Sources
- The Book of Noodles: Stories of Simpletons; Or, Fools And Their Follies
- The Book of Sindibad, 1884, 300 privately printed copies.
- 'Notes on the folk-lore of the Raven and the Owl,' in: Saxby, Jessie M.E. (1892). Birds of omen in Shetland (Inaugural address to the Viking club, London, October 13, 1892). London: Private Print. OCLC 2726479.
