= Mortimer Sloper Howell =

British magistrate and Asiatic scholar

Mortimer Sloper Howell CIE (3 February 1841 – 9 September 1925) was a British magistrate and scholar of Asiatic studies. Howell served his term as magistrate in the administrative region of the North-Western Provinces of British India from October 1862 to April 1896. During his tenure as magistrate, he composed a voluminous reference work titled A Grammar of the Classical Arabic Language, Translated and Compiled from the Works of the Most Approved Native or Naturalized Authorities.

== Education and career ==
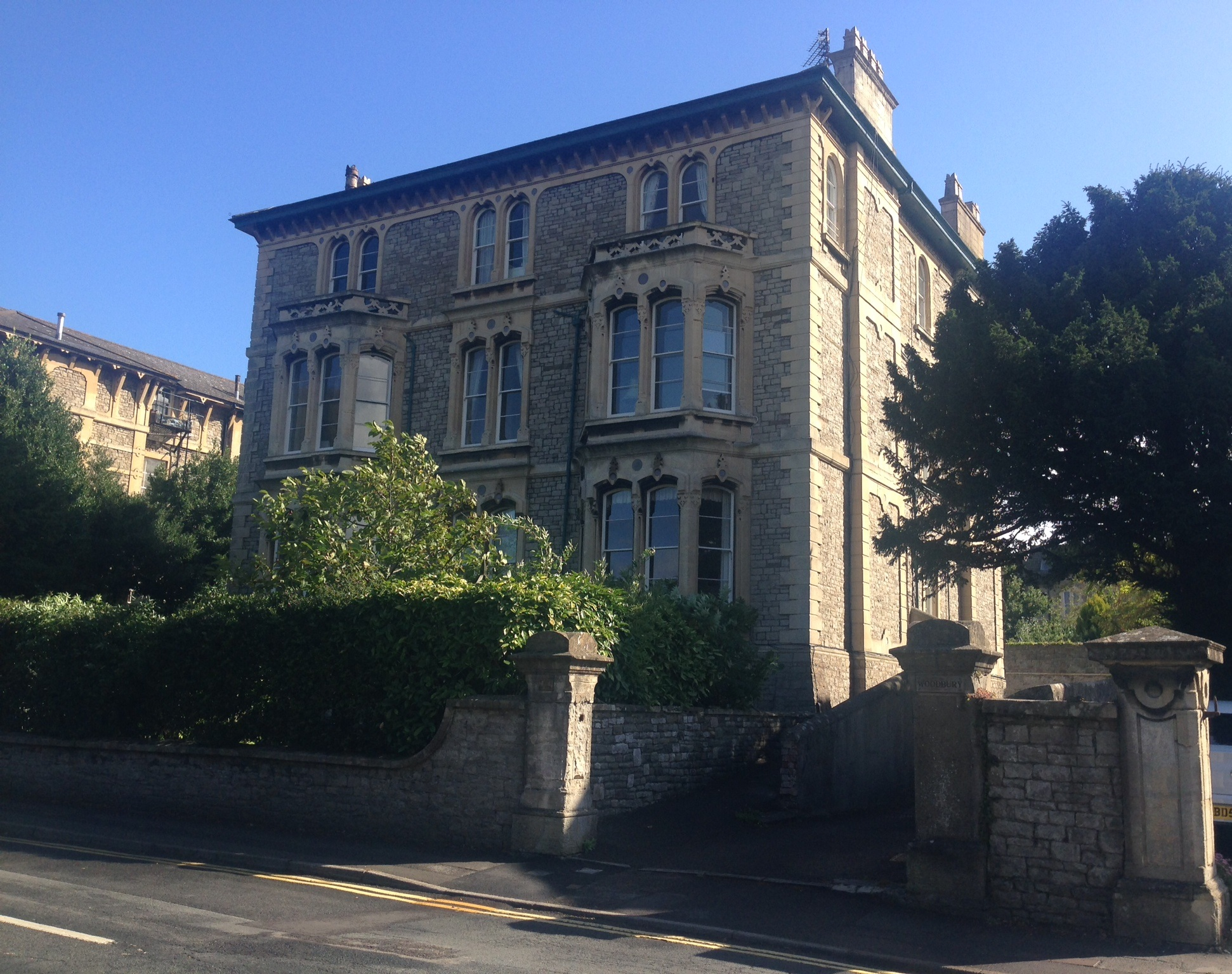
Woodbury of Clevedon, Somerset, Howell's former residence

Howell was educated at Christ's Hospital in his junior years. He then went on to study at Corpus Christi College at the University of Oxford. Howell retired from Her Majesty's service as Judiciary Commissioner of the North-Western Provinces and Oudh in April 1896. On returning to England, he resided at Woodbury of Clevedon, Somerset, until his death. He died of natural causes at the age of 84 at his home on 9 September 1925.

== The Grammar ==
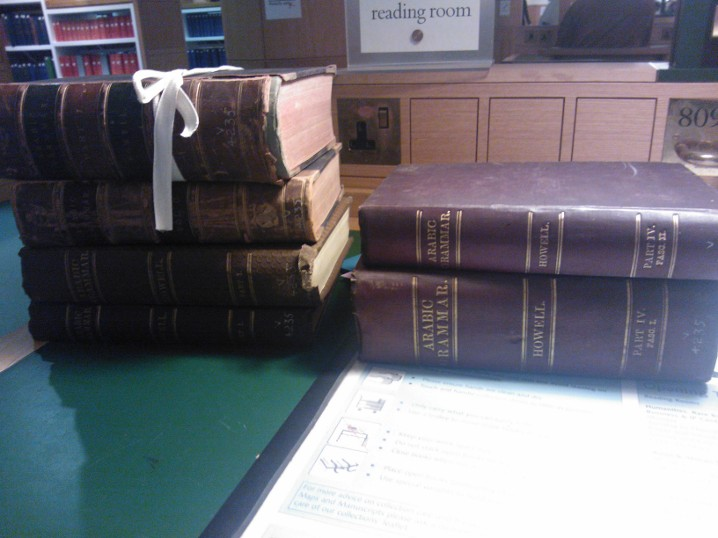
One of three original prints known to exist, British Library, London

Howell's grammar, A Grammar of the Classical Arabic Language, Translated and Compiled from the Works of the Most Approved Native or Naturalized Authorities, was composed as an amalgamation of every significant Classical text of grammar, from the early Islamic period, authored between the 8th and 13th centuries. It is set apart from other Classical Arabic grammars written in English by virtue of its inclusion of the discussions and debates that circulated among Classical Arabic grammarians and lexicologists with regard to syntactic rules and morphology. It covers with considerable detail the topics of Incorporation (Arabic: الإدغام) and of Imāla (Arabic: الإمالة) that seldom feature in comparable works.

Owing to the sheer bulk of Howell's grammar, the work was published as fasciculi over a period of 31 years; the first fasciculus being published in 1880, and the last in 1911. As regards pagination, the work is divided into 2 volumes that were issued as 6 fasciculi in total. Including all appendices, frontal matter, notes, and parsing perusals, the work is constituted of more than 4000 pages.

The work has long since been out of print, although, several publishers offer printed copies of scanned versions on demand.

Several websites offer, for download, versions in pdf format of Howell's grammar.

Three original prints are known to exist: one in the British Library of London, one in the Bodleian Library of the University of Oxford, and one in the library of the University of Toronto.
