= Yeates Removals =

English removals and storage company

G. H. Yeates & Sons Ltd
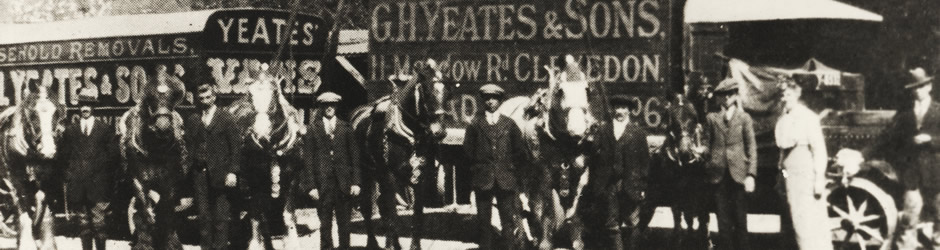
- Yeates Removals horses and carts in 1910
- Trade name: Yeates Removals
- Industry: Moving company
- Founded: 1910
- Headquarters: Clevedon, United Kingdom
- Website: www.yeates.co.uk

Yeates Removals is a removals and storage company founded in 1910. Yeates Removals is located in Clevedon, Somerset, England.

== History ==
Yeates was established in 1910 and initially used horses and carts for general haulage in Clevedon and the surrounding areas. Yeates is the oldest family run removal business in the Bristol area and is currently headed by James Griffin after he took over from his father John in 2001.

To coincide with Yeates’ 100th year in business, the company began raising funds for Children's Hospice South West. By 2015, Yeates had raised in excess of £11,500 for the charity.
