= Curzon Memories App =

Locative media mobile app in UK

The Curzon Memories App is a locative media mobile app based at the Curzon Community Cinema, Clevedon, UK. The cinema celebrated its centenary in April 2012 and is one of the oldest continuously operating independent cinemas in the UK. The app was developed as part of an academic practice-based research project by Charlotte Crofts in collaboration with the Curzon's education officer, Cathy Poole and was funded by the Digital Cultures Research Centre and an Early Career Researcher Grant from the University of the West of England.

The app draws upon the extensive Curzon Collection of Cinema Heritage Technology and contains audio and video dramatisations and oral histories of employees and patrons recounting their experiences throughout the life of the cinema, including Julia Elton (daughter of Sir Arthur Elton, a pioneer of British documentary) and Muriel Williams, who was in the cinema on the night it got bombed during the Bristol Blitz January 1941.

Visitors to the cinema are invited to download the free app, from iTunes or Google Play, and access those experiences in the locations where they actually happened. QR Codes are discreetly placed around the cinema, which act as triggers for these memories. The App also contains a walk around the exterior of the building which includes memories and rephotography of archive photographs triggered by GPS signals as the participant takes the walk. For those who cannot get to the Curzon Cinema, there is a manual interface, and the QR codes are available at the official website.

The app was built using the AppFurnace authoring system, made by Calvium, and is available on both Apple iOS and Android.

== Projection Hero ==
One of the unique features of the Curzon Mermories project is Projection Hero, an Internet of Things installation developed by Charlotte Crofts, in collaboration with Tarim at Media Playgrounds, which comprises a miniature cinema which can be operated via any web-enabled smartphone by scanning the QR code on the cinema screen, either from within the Curzon Memories App or using any QR Reader. The installation also works by typing in the accompanying URL into a web browser. This takes the user to an interface which enables the user to manipulate the cinema. The smartphone effectively becomes a "remote control" allowing the user to dim the lights, open the curtains and play the movies, using a combination of Arduino circuit and actuators connected to the Internet via an H bridge. The installation features interviews with retired projectionists Maurice Thornton and Pete Stamp, discussing the art of projection in the digital age. The installation is on permanent display at the Curzon Cinema, Clevedon, and has also been exhibited at the Watershed Media Centre, Bristol.

== Reviews ==
The Curzon Memories App was selected to pitch in front of industry judges at AppCircus London Google Campus and won the Media Communications and Cultural Studies Association Annual Conference, MeCCSA 2012 Poster prize. The project was featured on BBC Radio 4's You and Yours in an item on AppCircus where one of the jury, Facebook's Simon Cross said “You take the concept of what they did which is to bring the history of this old cinema to life, they could’ve stopped at videos and text, but connecting it to something physical such as a screen you can control from your phone, that’s a completely different experience … it just feels like you are connected to it, because your phone is controlling it … that feels pretty cool to me”.

The app has also been featured in the following press: The Guardian Apps Rush: "More location-based UK goodness with this app, based on the Curzon Community Cinema in Clevedon. It gets people to scan QR codes around the building to hear stories from local people. There's a manual interface to access everything if you're not in Clevedon too", Wired UK Magazine, Film Studies For Free, The Pervasive Media Cookbook, Imperica.

== Research ==
This app was developed as part of an academic research project based at the University of the West of England to explore how new media can be used to enhance cinema heritage. It has been disseminated at a number of international academic conferences:

- 2011 ‘The Curzon Creative Technologies Project: Context Aware Media in a Screen Heritage Context’ at MeCCSA 2011 Annual Conference, Salford, Jan.
- 2011 ‘Technologies of Being: Pervasive Heritage’ at Postdigital Encounters: Creativity and Improvisation, JMP Symposium, UWE/Watershed, Bristol, June.
- 2011 ‘Pervasive Screens: Transforming the Consumption of Cinema History with the Curzon Heritage App’, Screen 2011, Glasgow, July.
- 2011 ‘Technologies of Seeing the Past: The Curzon Memories App’, EVA London 2011 Electronic and Visual Arts Conference, July. Article published in the peer-reviewed conference proceedings.
- 2012 Poster ‘“You Must Remember This”: Using Mobile Technologies to Celebrate the History of the Cinema with the Curzon Memories App’, plus exhibit of the Projection Hero installation, MeCCSA 2012, Jan – won prize for best poster.
- ‘The Curzon Memories Project: Reflections On The First Iteration’ at the Open Studio Lunchtime Talk, Pervasive Media Studio, Bristol, March (invited).
- 2011 ‘The Curzon Memories App: Designing a Screen Heritage Experience’, at Centre for Media and Cultural Research, Birmingham City University, May (invited, plus expenses).
- 2011 ‘Spatialising the Archive: Dramatisation, Oral History and Locative Heritage in the Curzon Memories App’ at IMTAL International Museum and Theatre Alliance Conference, Bristol, October (invited).
- 2011 ‘The Curzon Memories App – Shifting Practices, from Filmmaking to Experience Design’ MA Masterclass, University of Sussex Department of Media, Film and Music, October (invited, plus fee and expenses).
- 2011 Presentation on ‘The Curzon Memories App’, with Curzon Education Officer, Cathy Poole at MovIES (Moving Image Education Specialists) Meeting, BFI Southbank, November (invited, plus expenses).
- 2012 ‘Geo-spatial and Geo-temporal documentary: The Curzon Memories App, City Strata and The Cinemap Layer’, i-docs 2012, Watershed Media Centre, March (invited).
- 2012 Keynote: 'Being T/here: Locative Media Design and the Need for Armchair Mode', Environmental Utterance Conference, University of Falmouth, September (invited, plus fee and expenses).
