= Jessie Saxby =

Scottish writer, folklorist and suffragist (1842–1940)

Jessie Saxby c. 1891

Jessie Margaret Edmondston Saxby (30 June 1842 – 27 December 1940) was a Scottish writer and folklorist from Unst, one of the Shetland Islands. She also had political interests and was a suffragette.

== Family ==
Born on 30 June 1842 at Halligarth, (Note: Halligarth is the house built for Saxby's father in 1832; it was extended in 1839 with the addition of another house as the family grew in size.) Baltasound, on the Shetland Island of Unst, Saxby's father was Laurence Edmondston, a medical doctor and naturalist; her mother was Eliza Macbrair (1801–1869), a journalist and published author from a Glasgow family. The couple had ten other children including Thomas, a botanist.

By her own admission, Saxby received little formal education.

Henry Saxby, a London born ornithologist and doctor, became Saxby's husband on 16 December 1859. The couple had six children but their only daughter died when an infant. They lived on Unst and Henry was a partner in his father-in-law's medical practice until 1871 when poor health necessitated a move to Edinburgh. The following year, in 1872, the family re-located to Inveraray but Henry died aged 37 on 4 September 1873. As a widow with a family to support, Jessie had to rely on the income from her writing and returned to Edinburgh for 17 years before finally moving back to Unst in 1890.

Thomas Edmondston Saxby (1869-1952), also a physician who lived and worked at Halligarth, and an ornithologist, was their son.

== Career ==
Saxby's career started in the 1860s when several of her tales and some poetry were printed. Lichens from the Old Rock, a poetry book, was published in 1868, the first of the 47 books she authored. The subject matter of her books was varied, covering diverse topics such as romantic fiction, folklore but particularly boys adventure stories. She also wrote around 100 articles that were printed in newspapers, journals and magazines like Life and Work and The Boy's Own Paper.

→Jessie Saxby wrote an appreciation of the life of Dr Joseph Bell, who is known as the prototype for Sherlock Holmes, as well as for his distinguished medical career. Her book is titled "Joseph Bell...an appreciation by an old friend", and it was published by Oliphant, Anderson & Ferrier in 1913. At the end of the book, Jessie signs her name, Jessie M.E. Saxby, and it follows these words: "As he had lived, Joe Bell died, brave, self-forgetful, upheld by the Divine...I shall not see his like again." [See the book mentioned in this text for authentication]←

== Bibliography ==
- Saxby, Jessie M.E. (1879). Geordie Roye, or, A waif from the Greyfriars Wynd. Glasgow: John S. Marr & Sons. OCLC 61514787 (all editions).
- —— (1882). Breakers Ahead; or, Uncle Jack's stories of great shipwrecks of recent times: 1869 to 1880. London: Nelson & Sons. OCLC 503771547 (all editions).
- —— (1882). Snow dreams, or, Funny fancies for little folks. Edinburgh: Johnstone, Hunter & Co. OCLC 62393660 (all editions).
- Edmondston, Rev. Biot; Saxby, Jessie M.E. (1888). The Home of a Naturalist. London: Nisbet & Co. OCLC 752665246 (all editions).

Some of the articles in this book were previously published in magazines like Chamber's Journal and The Leisure Hour. The texts, alternately written by Jessie Saxby and her brother, are in part reminiscences of their life as children on Unst, and about their father and grandfather. According to a 1979 bibliographic survey the book is "one of the finest of the older works on Shetland."

- Saxby, Jessie M.E. (1890). West-Nor'West. London: Nisbet & Co. ISBN 9780665305696. OCLC 21941094 (all editions).
- —— (1892). Viking-Boys. London: Nisbet & Co. OCLC 776423592 (all editions).
- —— (1892). Birds of omen in Shetland (Inaugural address to the Viking club, London, October 13, 1892). London: Private Print. OCLC 2726479 (all editions).

With notes on the folk-lore of the Raven and the Owl, by William Alexander Clouston.

- —— (1932). Shetland traditional lore. Edinburgh: Grant & Murray. OCLC 4897052 (all editions).
