= Curzon Community Cinema, Clevedon =

Cinema in Clevedon, England

Coordinates: 51°26′08.66″N 2°51′18.08″W

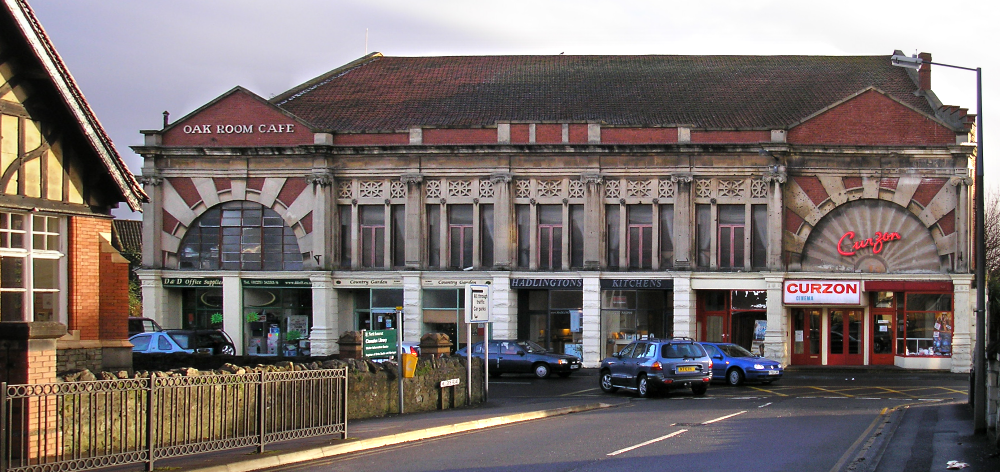
The exterior of the cinema, 2005

The Curzon Cinema & Arts, in Clevedon, North Somerset, England, is one of the oldest continually running purpose-built cinemas in the world.

== History ==
Opened on 20 April 1912 by Victor Cox, the original building had 200 seats and the first show raised funds for the survivors and relatives of those who were lost at sea earlier in the month on the RMS Titanic. Its first projector was gas powered, but in subsequent years the building was improved with the addition of extra seating (bringing the total number of seats to 389), and was the first public building in the town to have electricity, which also saw the projector upgraded to run on electricity.

Between 1920 and 1922, a new cinema was built on the site (without interruption to the nightly programme of films). The building, still in use to this day, has a row of shops along the front, the Oak Room Cafe above, and facilities for stage shows. The cinema was the site of Clevedon's only fatality due to enemy action in the Second World War, when a soldier standing in the cinema doorway was killed by a bomb, damage from which is still visible on the exterior. Muriel Williams, who was in the cinema when it was bombed, recalls the air raid warning flashing on the screen on the night it was bombed in the Curzon Memories App. The App also includes memories from Julia Elton, daughter of documentarian Sir Arthur Elton, who remembers her grandmother frequenting the Oak Room Cafe and rephotography of archive photos of the cinema through the ages.

In 1945, the cinema (previously known as "The Picture House") was sold and changed its name to the "Maxime". Another change of ownership in 1953 brought its current name. After years of decline, the building was greatly altered during the late sixties and early seventies: the box fronts, along with the organ, were removed and the openings 'bricked-up', the balcony was closed, the suspended false ceiling installed, and the projection room returned to its original position at the rear of the stalls.

Never hugely profitable, the cinema was taken into administrative receivership in 1995, and after a campaign to save the cinema spearheaded by Jon Webber, it was bought by Clevedon Community Centre for the Arts, a registered charity, which continues to run it. Patrons include Sir Charles Elton, son of the notable documentary director Sir Arthur Elton, Aardman Animations founders David Sproxton and Peter Lord, directors Nick Park and Terry Gilliam, and actors Tony Robinson and Alan Rickman.

In 2009, the Curzon Cinema successfully passed the first round in its bid to the Heritage Lottery Fund (HLF) and was awarded £31,700 to help develop a more detailed bid for second phase of the awards process. A subsequent Stage II award of £321,900 in 2010 allowed the cinema to complete the first stage of restoration, with some repairs made to the roof, a new exhibition and lounge bar installed, and the Curzon Collection of Heritage Cinema Technology being relocated to the former Coach House adjoining the building.

In 2012, the Curzon Cinema reached the final for Best Heritage Project of the National Lottery Awards.

The Curzon celebrated its centenary on 20 April 2012, with a weekend of celebrations. Run by charitable trust, the Curzon is now seeking to raise funds for the next phase of its restoration, including the Balcony.

In 2015, the former Coach House was transformed into a cafe bar, whilst the Curzon Cinema Collection was put on display throughout the cinema.

From 2018, the Curzon began to host a boomsatsuma Media Production Extended Diploma at the Curzon Cinema Studio, alongside the North Somerset Creative Campus at Nailsea School.
