= St Andrew's Church, Clevedon =

Church in Somerset, England

Church of St Andrew
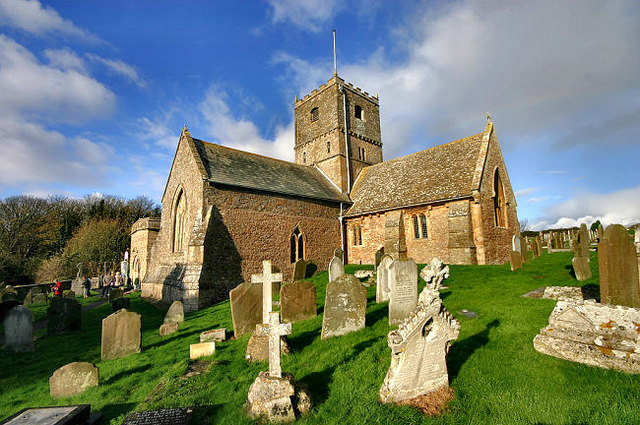

- Location within Somerset

General information
- Location: Old Church Road, Clevedon, North Somerset BS21 7UE, England
- Coordinates: 51.433171°N 2.873668°W
- Completed: 14th century

The Church of St Andrew in Clevedon, Somerset, England. Parts of the original 12th-century church remain with 14th- and 15th-century additions. It is on a hill overlooking the Bristol Channel, and has been designated as a Grade I listed building.

The church was built on Anglo-Saxon foundations.

It is the burial place of Arthur Hallam, subject of the poem In Memoriam A.H.H. by his friend Alfred, Lord Tennyson. The exterior of the church includes a carving which may be a Sheela na gig. The Anglican parish of Clevedon is part of the Portishead deanery.

St Andrew's was used as a filming location to depict the local parish church in all three series of the popular crime drama Broadchurch.

== See also ==
- List of ecclesiastical parishes in the Diocese of Bath and Wells
