= Arthur Edmondston =

Scottish physician and writer

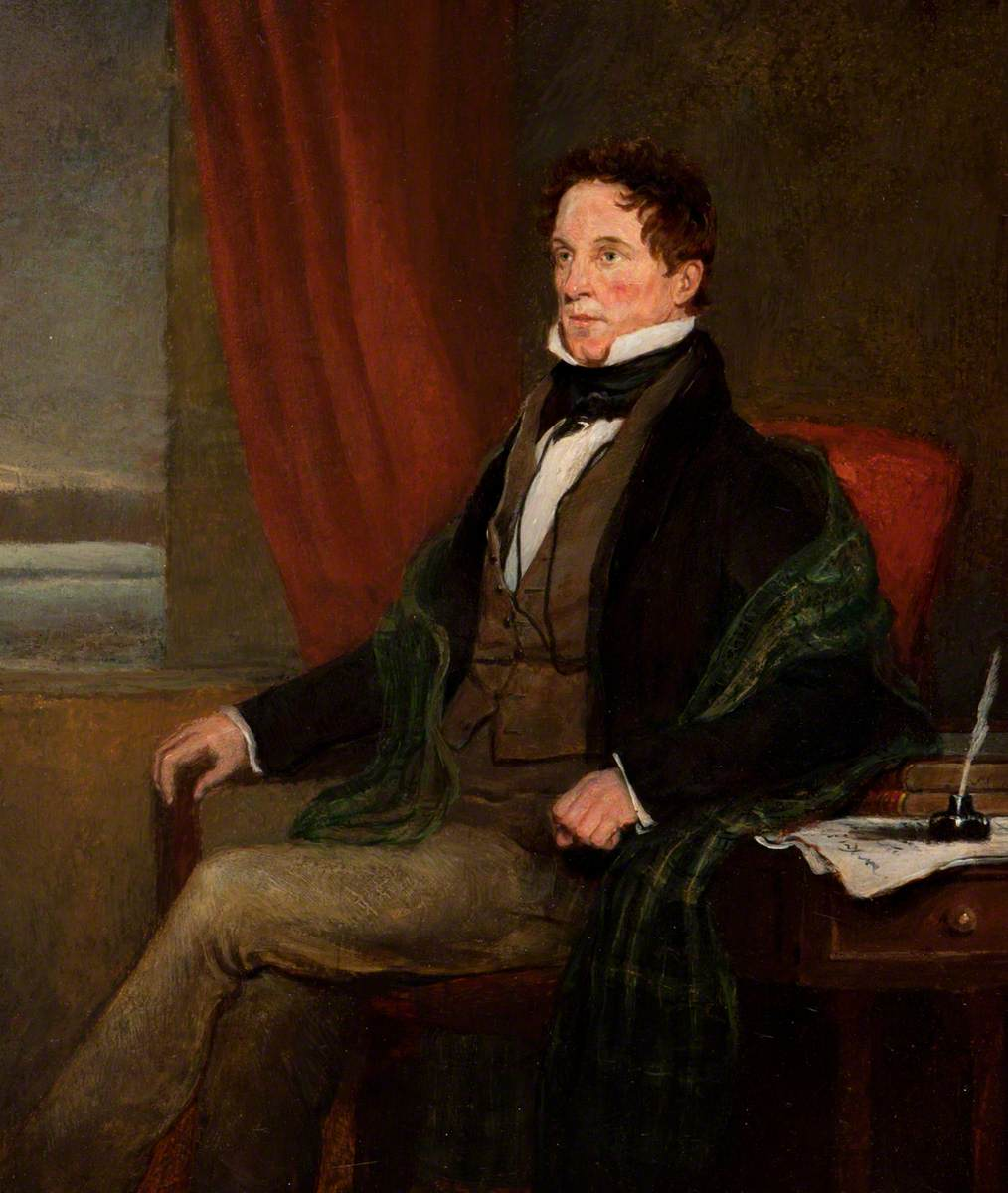
- Born: 10 November 1775; Lerwick, Shetland, Scotland
- Died: 17 February 1841 (aged 65); Lerwick, Shetland, Scotland
- Burial place: Lerwick 1st Cemetery
- Occupations: Physician; Writer
- Era: Age of Enlightenment
- Spouses: Laura Irvine; Grizel Leask; Ellie Georgeson
- Children: 4
- Medical career
- Field: Physician

Arthur Edmondston, M.D. (10 November 1775 – 17 February 1841) was a Scottish physician and writer in the Shetland Isles.

== Life ==
Edmondston, eldest son of Laurence Edmondston of Hascosay, surgeon in Lerwick, and Mary Sanderson of Buness, Shetland, was born about 1776 in Lerwick. The family of Edmondston is one of the oldest in Shetland. Edmondston's father for most of his long life was the only medical practitioner in the islands. Arthur adopted his father's profession, entered the army, and served under Sir Ralph Abercromby in Egypt.

Returning to Lerwick he succeeded to his father's practice, and died unmarried in 1841. He was a skilful physician, giving special attention to diseases of the eye. Edmondston was the brother of Dr. Laurence Edmondston.

== Works ==
Edmondston wrote two treatises on ophthalmia, published respectively in London, 1802, and Edinburgh, 1806. His major work was his View of the Ancient and Present State of the Zetland Islands, published in 1809 in two volumes. The book discusses the political and natural history of Shetland, its agriculture, fisheries, commerce, antiquities, and customs.
