= Thomas Edmondston =

British botanist (1825–1846)

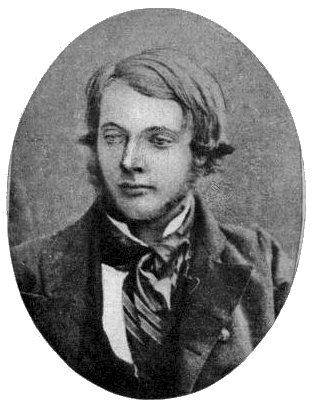
- Born: 20 September 1825; Buness, Baltasound, Unst
- Died: 24 January 1846 (aged 20); Sua Bay, Peru
- Education: Andersonian University of Glasgow (Prof.)
- Known for: Discovery of Cerastium nigrescens
- Scientific career
- Fields: Botany
- Workplaces: Shetland
- Author abbrev. (botany): Edmondston

Thomas Edmondston (1825–1846) was a British-born botanist, born in Buness, Unst.

The family of Edmondston (also spelt Edmonston) was prominent in 19th-century Shetland. Thomas Edmondston's uncle, also Thomas Edmondston, was laird of the Buness estate on Unst and host to many scientific visitors to Shetland. Another uncle, Dr Arthur Edmondston, had written A View of the Ancient and Present State of the Zetland Islands in 1809. His father, Laurence Edmondston, was also an accomplished naturalist.

Edmondston compiled the first known list of Shetland plants at the age of 11. He discovered several rare plants growing on the serpentine rocks on Unst, including the endemic Shetland Mouse-ear Cerastium nigrescens, known as Edmondston's Chickweed on the island. In 1845, he produced his Flora of Shetland, which, despite a few shortcomings, was a considerable achievement given his age and it is still an important reference for Shetland botany. Less well known is his fauna, mainly a list of birds, published in the journal The Zoologist in 1844. This is less reliable and much of it was obviously derived much from the work of his father, Laurence, and his uncle, Arthur.

Thomas Edmondston was appointed Professor of Botany at Anderson's University in Glasgow (now University of Strathclyde), at the age of just 20. A few months later, he was offered the position of naturalist on board HMS Herald, on a journey retracing the voyage of HMS Beagle, and Charles Darwin became a frequent correspondent with requests for further observations. While disembarking from a boat on the coast of South America, however, Edmondston was killed by an accidentally discharged gun, cutting short a career of great promise. After his death, Charles Darwin was in regular correspondence with his father on Unst and was particularly interested in Edmonston's ongoing ornithological observations. The Edmonston family on Unst remain as Laird.

After his death, his parents named another newborn son Thomas, reusing a family name as was a common practice in Scotland in this era.

== Sources ==
- Gott, Tony, ed. (30 May 2018). "Thomas Edmondston". North Isles Family History (bayanne.info/Shetland). I10652.
- Pennington, M. G., Osborn, K., Harvey, P. V., Riddington, R., Okill, J. D., Ellis, P. M. & Heubeck, M. 2004. The Birds of Shetland. Christopher Helm, London. ISBN 9780713660388
- Scott, W. & Palmer, R. 1987. The Flowering Plants and Ferns of the Shetland Islands. Shetland Times, Lerwick. ISBN 0900662565
