= Laurence Edmondston =

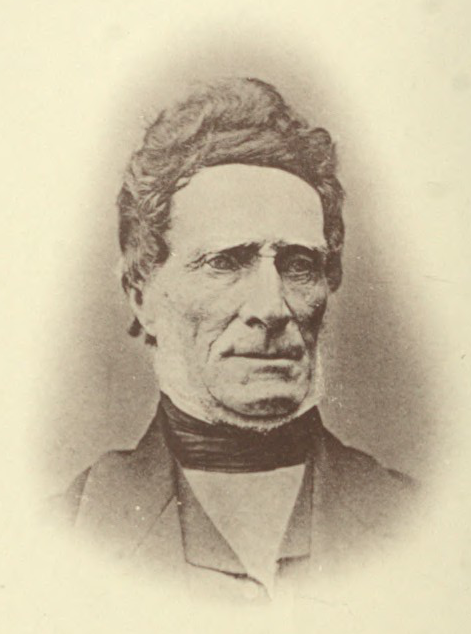
Laurence Edmondston

Dr. Laurence Edmondston (9 February 1795 – 7 March 1879) was a Scottish-born naturalist and medical doctor who was from Shetland, Scotland, United Kingdom.

Laurence Edmondston was born in Lerwick, the capital of Shetland, in 1795. His mother was Mary Sanderson (1751–1831) and his father Laurence Edmondston (1740–1814). He was the youngest brother of Arthur Edmondston (1776–1841).

He worked in London at a mercantile office, and resided and travelled on the continent for that office for some time. He then studied medicine in Edinburgh.

Although his family originally lived on the island of Hascosay in Shetland, Laurence settled as a medical practitioner on Unst, living at Halligarth, where he established a plantation in the late 1830s (trees are scarce in the islands).

In his teens, he acquired specimens of glaucous gull (Larus hyperboreus) and snowy owl (Bubo scandiacus), which were both later recognised as the first British records. In 1822 and 1823, while completing his medical studies in Edinburgh, Edmondston published several papers in the Memoirs of the Wernerian Society, adding two more species to the British List, Iceland gull (Larus glaucoides) and ivory gull (Pagophila eburnea).

Edmondston's publications revealed a careful observer, capable of recognising that several 'species' recognised at the time were others in juvenile or winter plumages; for example, 'speckled diver' was winter-plumaged red-throated diver (Gavia stellata) and 'black-billed auk' was juvenile razorbill (Alca torda). He was also a pioneer conservationist as, in 1831, he instructed the shepherds on Hermaness on Unst to ensure the safety of the tiny population of breeding great skuas.

His children included Thomas Edmondston the botanist and Jessie Saxby, an author and wife of the ornithologist Henry Saxby.

== Sources ==
- Pennington, M. G., Osborn, K., Harvey, P. V., Riddington, R., Okill, J. D., Ellis, P. M. & Heubeck, M. 2004. The Birds of Shetland. Christopher Helm, London.
- Stephen, Leslie, ed. (1888). "Edmondston, Laurence". Dictionary of National Biography. Vol. 16. London: Smith, Elder & Co.
