= Richard Arden-Davis =

English cricketer and clergyman

Personal information
- Born: 31 January 1855; Malinslee, Shropshire, England
- Died: 29 June 1917 (aged 62); Dorset, England

Domestic team information
- Years: Team
- 1881: Middlesex
- FC debut: 23 June 1881 Middlesex v Oxford University

Career statistics
| Competition | FC |
|---|---|
| Matches | 1 |
| Runs scored | 14 |
| Batting average | 7 |
| 100s/50s | 0/0 |
| Top score | 14 |
| Catches/stumpings | 1/– |
- Source: CricketArchive, 17 January 2009

Richard Arden-Davis (31 January 1855 – 29 June 1917) was an English first-class cricketer with Middlesex, and Anglican clergyman.

Arden-Davis was born at Malins Lee, Shropshire in 1855. He played cricket for Suffolk from 1877 until 1882, his match for Middlesex in 1881 was his only first-class appearance. The 1881 Census shows him as being resident at Woodland House School, Woodland Road, Edmonton, Middlesex, and described as a School Assistant (Music).

He eventually went into the Church, and was curate of St. John's, Worcester until August 1902, when he was appointed vicar of Clevedon, Somerset.
