= Henry Saxby =

Dr Henry Linckmeyer Saxby (19 April 1836 – 4 September 1873) was an English born medical doctor and ornithologist, most famous for his work in Shetland.

Saxby was born in London and his father, Stephen Martin Saxby, was of some renown himself, as a naval architect, inventor and weather forecaster. Henry Saxby first visited Shetland in 1854, assisting his elder brother, Stephen Henry Saxby (1831-1886) to collect bird specimens. In 1858, Henry Saxby returned to Shetland to Unst and in 1859 he married Jessie Edmondston, youngest daughter of Laurence Edmondston. To many Shetlanders, Jessie Margaret Edmondston Saxby, a prolific author, is the better known of the two. Henry Saxby was the island doctor for most of his residence on Unst. In 1871, he took his family to Argyllshire, but he was already ill and he died two years later. He had started work on a manuscript, eventually published in 1874 as The Birds of Shetland after it was edited and annotated by Stephen Saxby, who was then a vicar in Somerset.

One of his sons was Thomas Edmondston Saxby (1869–1952), who was also a physician and an ornithologist.

== Bibliography ==
- Saxby, Henry L. (1874). Stephen Saxby (ed.). The Birds of Shetland: with observations on their habits, migration, and occasional appearance. Edinburgh: Maclachlan & Stewart. OCLC 978065532.
