= Kate Reed =

British long-distance runner

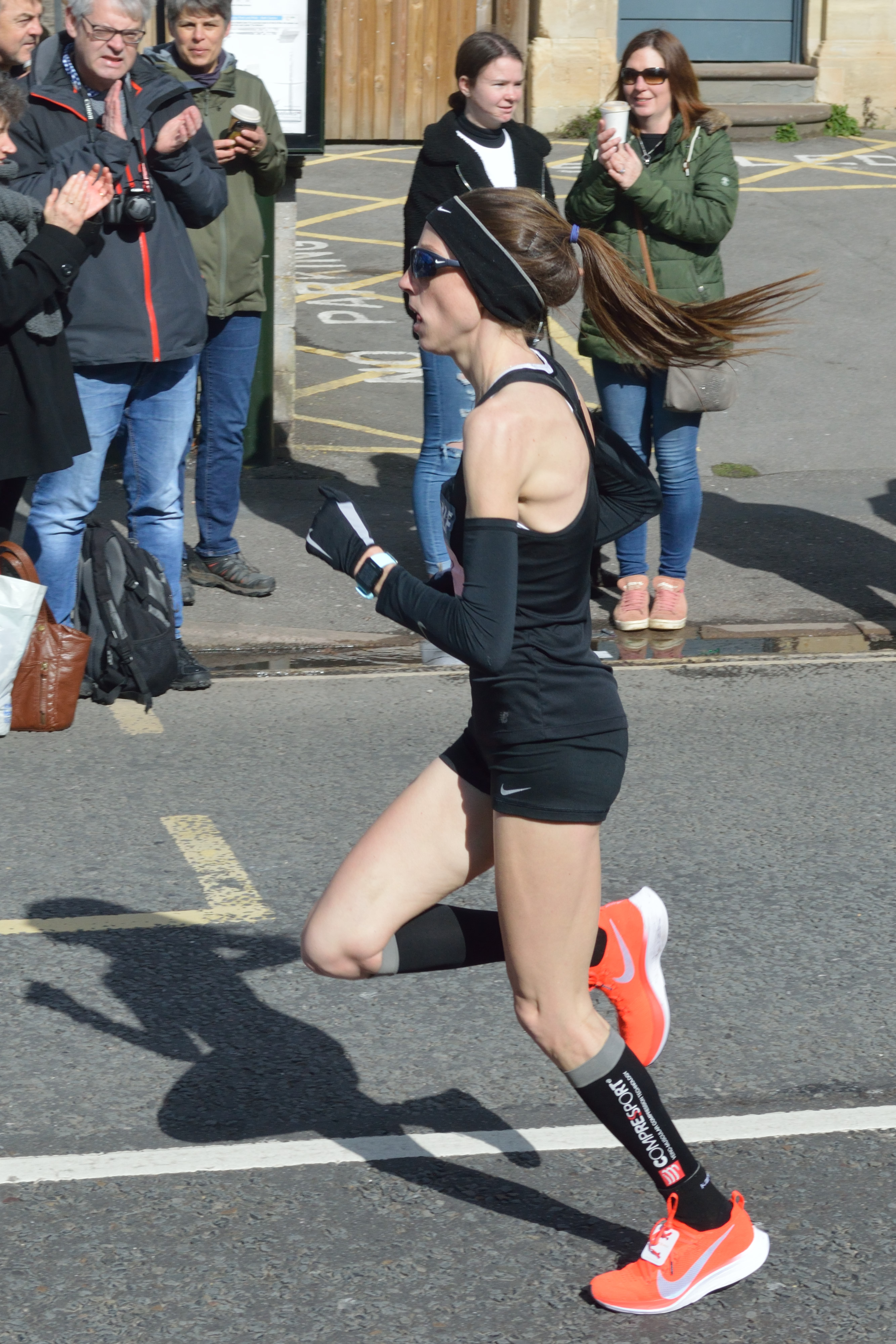
Reed in the 2019 Bath Half Marathon, which she won

Kate Amelia Reed (born 28 September 1982 in Bristol) is a British long-distance runner.

She finished second at the 2006 World University Cross Country Championships and second in the team event at the 2007 European Cross Country Championships. In 2008, she finished twenty-third in the women's 10,000 metres race at the Olympic Games.

Her personal bests are:

- 1500 metres - 4:13.55 min (2007)
- 3000 metres - 9:01.17 min (2007)
- 5000 metres - 15:29.10 min (2007)
- 10,000 metres - 31:35.77 min (2008)
