= History of Ilfracombe =

== Early history ==
Ilfracombe has been settled since the Iron Age, when the Dumnonii Celts established a hill fort on the dominant hill, Hillsborough (formerly Hele's Barrow). The origin of the town's name has two possible sources. The first is that it is a derivative of the Anglo-Saxon Alfreinscoma - by which name it was noted in the Liber Exoniensis of 1086. The translation of this name (from Walter William Skeat of the department of Anglo Saxon at Cambridge University) means the "Valley of the sons of Alfred". The second origin is that the name Ilfracombe was derived from Norse illf (bad), Anglo-Saxon yfel (evil ford) and Old English cumb (valley or bottom) from Cornish komm, Welsh cwm, thus 'The valley with the bad ford'.

The manor house at Chambercombe in east Ilfracombe was recorded in the 1086 Domesday Book as being built by a Norman knight Champernon (from Chambernon in France) who landed with William of Normandy. It is also said to be haunted. The property puzzled one occupier in 1738 as he could see five windows but he thought there to be only four bedrooms. Subsequently, he discovered a hidden room with the body of a young woman in bed.

Ilfracombe comprised two distinct communities; a farming community around the parish church called Holy Trinity, parts of which date from the 12th century, and a fishing community around the natural harbour formed between Capstone, Compass and Lantern Torrs. It is recorded that the lands by the church were part of the estate owned by Champernowne family, while those by the harbour belonged to the Bouchier family: Earls of Bath.

Because of the natural layout of the harbour, Ilfracombe became a significant safe port (registered port of refuge) on the Bristol Channel. It also had trade routes between Kinsale and Tenby, which made the port stronger. In 1208 it was listed as having provided King John with ships and men to invade Ireland; in 1247 it supplied a ship to the fleet that was sent to conquer the Western Isles of Scotland; 6 ships, with 79 men were sent to support the siege of Calais. Ilfracombe was the last disembarkation point for two large forces sent to subdue the Irish.

The building which sits on Lantern Hill by the harbour, known as St Nicholas's Chapel (built 1361) is reputed to be the oldest working lighthouse in the UK; a light/beacon has been there for over 650 years. The town was also home to the Bowen family. James Bowen was master of HMS Queen Charlotte, the flagship of Richard, Earl Howe at the 1794 "Glorious First of June" battle. James Bowen was commissioned by Howe for his leadership in the battle, he rose through the levels -- commander of the Argot, the Dreadnought, and in Georgian England titled "defender of Madeira", led the fleet which rescued the British army at Corunna in the Peninsula War, and retired as a rear admiral, Commissioner of the Royal Navy.

Captain Richard Bowen (1761–1797) James Bowen's younger brother, a British naval commander on the ship HMS Terpsichore, served under Lord Nelson, and was killed at the battle of Santa Cruz de Tenerife. John Bowen (1780–1827), son of James Bowen, a naval officer and colonial administrator founded the first settlement of Tasmania at Risdon Cove in 1803 - the settlement which later became known as Hobart. Lieutenant A E Down, was initially posted to Ilfracombe to lead a protection ship for the Customs and Excise. He married a local girl, rose through the levels to retire as Vice Admiral, his son joined the navy aged 14 (his first navy kit is on display at National Maritime Museum Greenwich). In 1802 James Meek married Down's daughter and settled in the town. James Meek was appointed the Comptroller of Victuals to the Royal Navy in 1832, he was knighted, and died in Ilfracombe in 1852. (gentlemen's gazette)

There was a wooden fortress overlooking the harbour; of this nothing remains except contemporary records and the area designated Castle Hill off Portland Street/Montepellier Terrace.

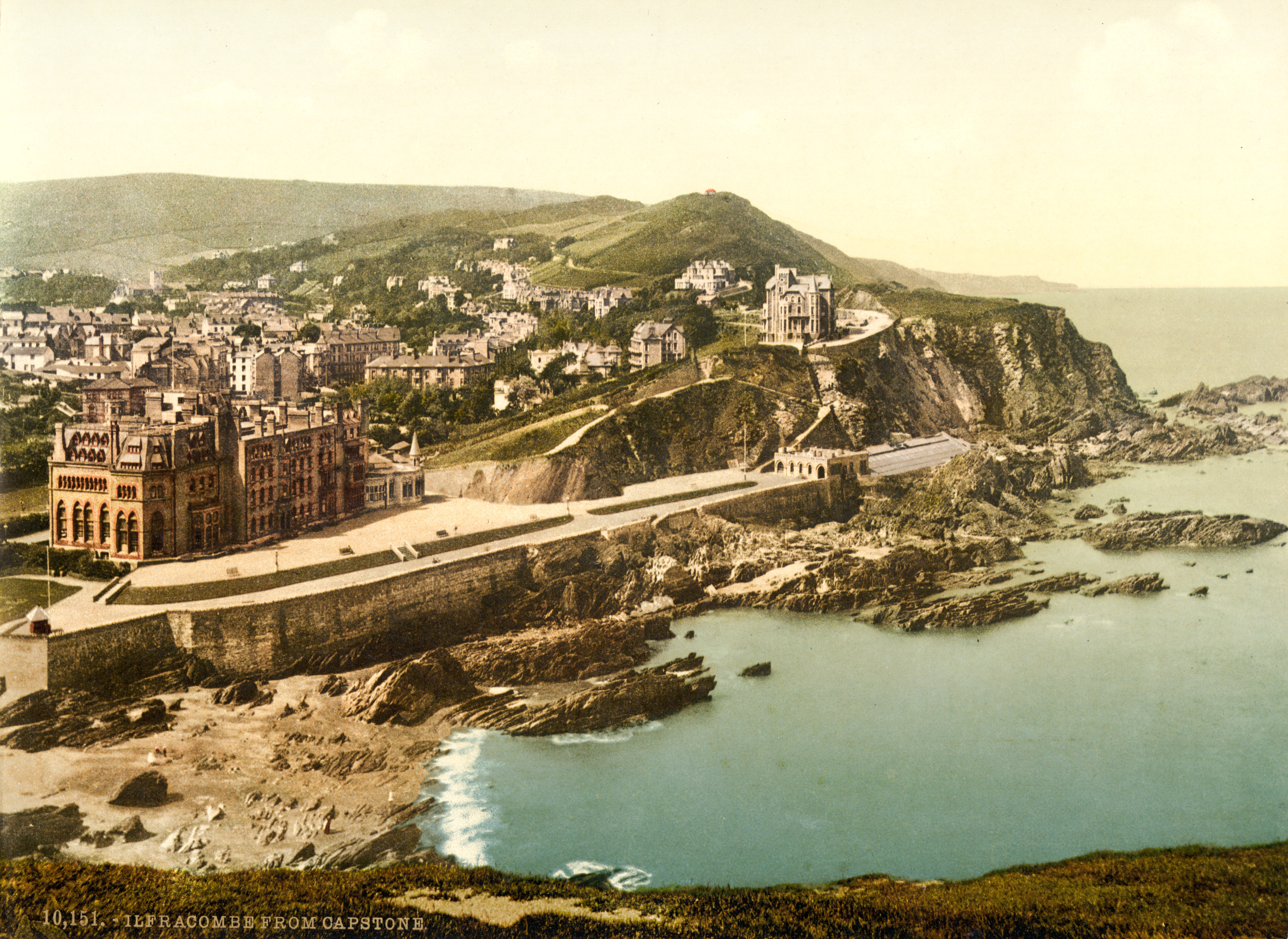
Photochrom of Ilfracombe, 1890s

The novelist Fanny Burney stayed in Ilfracombe in 1817. Her diary entries (31 July – 5 October) record early 19th century life in Ilfracombe: a captured Spanish ship; two ships in distress in a storm; the visit of Thomas Bowdler; and her lucky escape after being cut off by the tide. A few years later in the 1820s a set of four tunnels were hand carved by Welsh miners to permit access to the beaches by horse-drawn carriage as well as by foot. Previously access was gained by climbing the cliffs, rounding the point by boat, swimming or at the lowest tides clambering around the rocks of the point.

These tunnels led to a pair of tidal pools, which in accordance with Victorian morals, were used for segregated male and female bathing. Whereas women were constrained to a strict dress code covering up the whole body, men generally swam naked. The tunnels are still viewable and are signposted as Tunnels Beaches.

In 1856 writer Mary Ann Evans (pen-name George Eliot) accompanied George Henry Lewes to Ilfracombe to gather materials for his work Seaside Studies published in 1858.

In 1911, the Irish nationalist Anna Catherine Parnell (sister of Charles Stewart Parnell) drowned at Ilfracombe.

Miss Alice Frances Louisa Phillips (b. 26 January 1891 at 85 High Street, Ilfracombe) and her father Mr Escott Robert Phillips (b. 1869 Cardiff) held 2nd Class Ticket #2 on RMS Titanic, and set sail from Southampton on 10 April 1912 heading for New Brighton, Pennsylvania. Alice was rescued in boat 12, her father was lost in the disaster.

Until the mid-19th century Ilfracombe's economy was based around maritime activities: importing lime and coal from Wales; fishing for herring; and international trade, including to West Africa and the West Indies. In George III and the Regency period the town was home to many navy personnel – four admirals, numerous captains, and other commissioned and non-commissioned sailors.

== Railway ==
From 1874, Ilfracombe was served by the Ilfracombe railway line that ran from Barnstaple, but this closed in 1970.

== Tourism ==
The town gradually developed into a tourist resort served by ferries along the Bristol Channel. The opening of the railway accelerated this development. The population grew until the First World War, then stabilised at 9,200.

During the boom times of tourism in the 1950s there was not a large enough local workforce to service the needs of the tourism industry during the summer months. Many local businesses advertised in Northern cities such Manchester and Liverpool to alleviate this problem. This 'inward migration' caused social problems and friction between these people and those with a long history of residence. At its peak over 10,000 holidaymakers used the railway each Saturday during peak season, and passenger ferries brought still more. When the tourism market faltered with the arrival of cheap foreign package holidays in the 1960s, and the closure of the railway, unemployment levels rose.

== Ferry ==
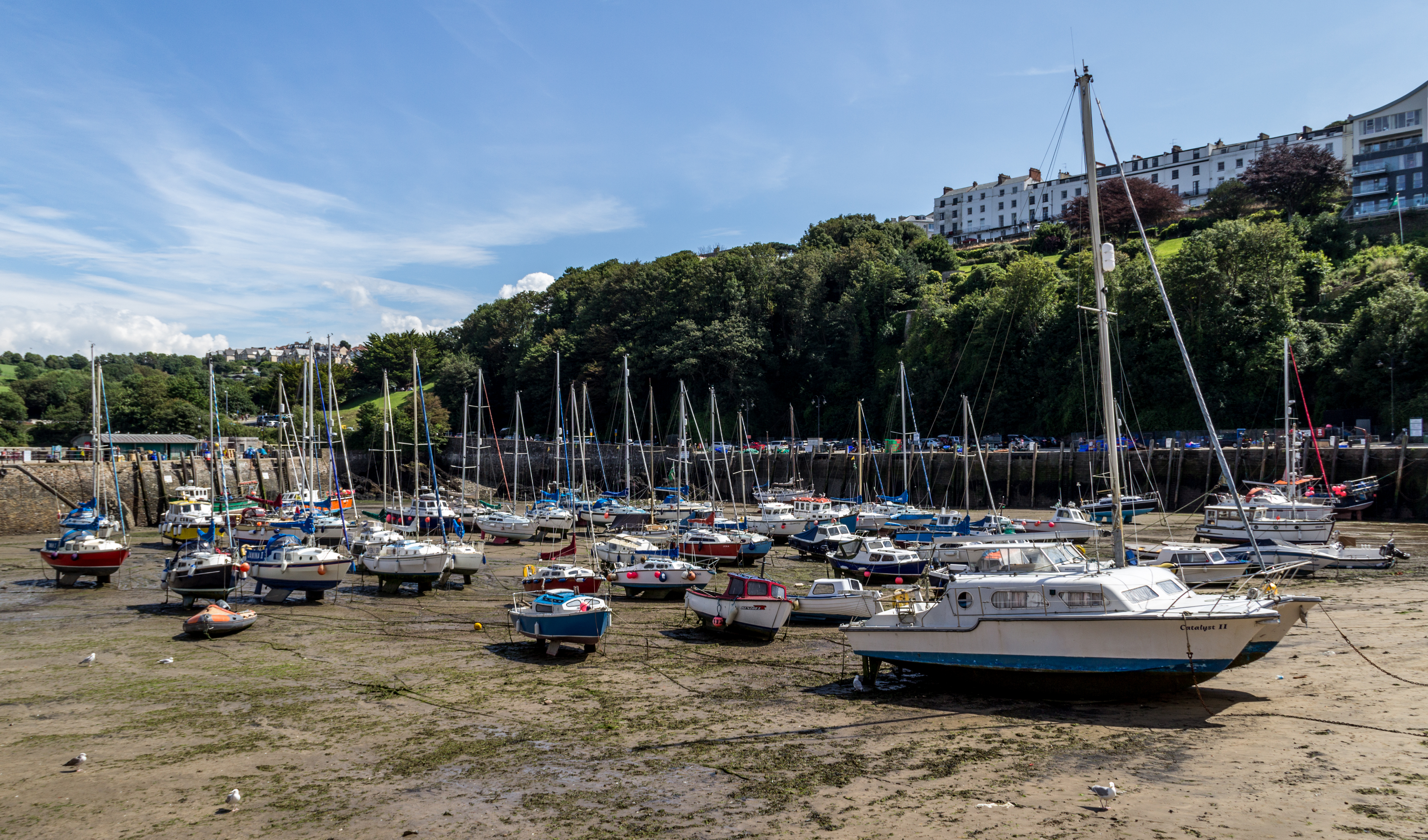
Harbour

The first steam packets arrived at Ilfracombe in 1823, and soon a regular service between Bristol and Swansea developed. On 16 May 1873, a wooden promenade pier was opened to allow the pleasure steamers to berth at all tides. On 23 June 1894, it was reported in the Ilfracombe Chronicle that over 2,500 people arrived in no less than seven boats, it describes them as 'commodious and well-appointed vessels with an excellent reputation for speed and comfort.' As well as holidaymakers, the boats carried workers, live and dead stock, and other merchandise to and from the town. The PS Waverley arrived in Ilfracombe in 1887, after her owners Messrs P & A Campbell brought her to Bristol, initially on a charter, as their first pleasure steamer to work the Bristol Channel. Deterioration of the wooden pier and part demolition during World War II mean that a new pier was required. The wood was replaced with reinforced concrete and car parking space was increased. The new pier was opened on 6 July 1952.

== Lifeboat ==
The town's first lifeboat was bought in 1828 but a permanent service was not available until the Royal National Lifeboat Institution built a lifeboat station at the bottom of Lantern Hill near the pier in 1866. The present station at Broad Street dates from 1996.

== Ilfracombe's Fires ==
The Great Fire of Ilfracombe started at 12:40 am on the night of 28 July 1896 in the basement of Mr William Cole's ironmongers and furniture shop on the corner of Portland Street and Fore Street. The local volunteer fire brigade had it under control by the following morning. The firebrigade's entire equipment was a manual Merryweather engine, a hose-reel cart and one telescopic ladder on wheels. In total thirty five houses and business premises and their contents were destroyed. Later that year the fire brigade crew were presented with medals and £2 each at a dinner in their honour at the Royal Clarence Hotel. The damage was estimated at the time at between £80,000 and £100,000.

The same area of the town was struck by fire twice during the 1980s. First on 12 December 1981 Draper's paint store in the upper story of the building on the corner of Portland Street and Fore Street, this fire was contained quickly, however fumes from the burning paint meant much of the local area was evacuated during the night. The second much larger fire started at 2:30am on the night of 2 September 1983 in the shopping arcade under the Candar hotel. In this fire one life was lost. Both of these fires drew parallels to the Great Fire in the media of the time. The Candar Arcade site became the Candar sheltered residential apartments. The opening of Candar apartments was the last public engagement performed by Charles and Diana, as the Prince and Princess of Wales in 1992.

Other fires in Ilfracombe include: On 17 May 1985 the Beacon Castle was devastated by fire. On the 5 August 1991 the Mount Hotel was destroyed by fire. On 24 January 2001 the Hotel Cecil; 14 January 2004 the arcade on the seafront near Susan Day Residential Home was destroyed by fire. On 17 November 2004 and 13 February 2005 the Cliffe Hydro suffered from fires.

Shortly before 19:00 BST on Wednesday, 8 August 2006, a fire broke out at the derelict Montebello Hotel in Fore Street, Ilfracombe. Twenty fire engines were required to put out the blaze including a number rushed to the scene from Woolacombe, Barnstaple and the bordering county of Somerset. Specialist equipment was brought in from as far afield as Exeter, and according to the local radio news 85 firemen were involved at the fire. The fire spread to three neighbouring properties and showered debris over a wide area. The six-storey hotel was completely gutted, with only the front wall, chimney stacks and remains of the lift shaft frame surviving the blaze, and the fire was still being damped-down the following day. Fore Street was closed for some period due to the difficulties of demolition.

The building was eventually demolished when it was determined that the fire had left it structurally unsound. This caused additional headaches for the emergency services as curious members of the public ignored safety barriers in an attempt to see the remains more clearly.

== See also ==
- Ilfracombe Branch Line
- List of Ilfracombe people
