= Queen's Theatre, Barnstaple =

Theatre in Devon, England

Coordinates: 51.0810°N 4.0585°W

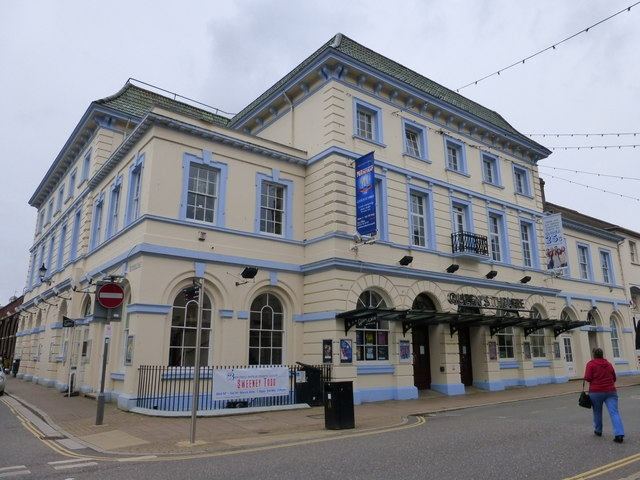
Queens Theatre

The Queen's Theatre is a theatre in Barnstaple, North Devon, England. It assumed its current form in 1993, but the history of theatre in Barnstaple can be traced back to at least 1435, when minstrels, players, jugglers and buffoons were an established feature of Barnstaple's annual fair. Documents indicate that in 1605 a touring troupe, the King's Players visited, and it is believed that William Shakespeare was one of their members.

John Gay, a renowned contributor in the theatre world, best known for the 'Beggar's Opera' was born in Barnstaple. Barnstaple's first theatre was built in Honey Pot Lane (now Theatre Lane) in 1760.

By 1832, it had become 'ruinous' and was forced to close. A new theatre, 'The Grecian Hall', opened in 1834. Renamed 'The Theatre Royal' around 1860, it regularly staged popular musicals and musical comedies. By 1880 this too had closed, although performances continued at a large room above the Corn Market (the site of the present theatre) which had served as a music hall since 1854.

The 'Theatre Royal' re-opened in 1893 and the music hall, now the 'Albert Hall', in 1897. The two venues operated successfully until just prior to World War I, when the 'Theatre Royal' was demolished. The Albert Hall continued providing musical entertainment until 1941, when it was destroyed by fire, probably from a discarded cigarette. In 1952 the hall was rebuilt (only the outer walls had survived the fire) as The Queen's Hall. Although with a plain and functional interior, it served the Barnstaple community, for a variety of purposes of live entertainment, antique markets, dog shows and similar functions for over forty years.

In 1993 the local council decided to fully refurbish the building, reopening as The Queens Theatre. The first production in the new facilities - the pantomime Snow White - opened on Christmas Eve that year.

In the summer of 2013 the theatre closed for major backstage refurbishment including a 23 line electric flying system (moving from 17 lines of three line hemp) and an electric orchestra pit. There were also minor improvements for access. The theatre reopened on 14 September.

This theatre, along with The Landmark, Ilfracombe is managed by The North Devon Theatres' Trust, a registered charity promoting the arts (including dance, drama, literature, music and singing) in North Devon.

On Monday 23 January 2017, it was announced that North Devon Theatres Trust which owns this theatre and The Landmark Theatre in Ilfracombe, had gone into administration. The theatre was bought out of administration and is now run by Parkwood Theatres. The shows started again on 31 May 2017.

On Friday 23 November 2018, it was announced that Selladoor Worldwide had been awarded a 10 Year Contract to manage the venue.
