= Tourist gateway =

Locations visited en route to tourism destinations

A tourist gateway (sometimes called a tourism gateway) is a place or settlement through which tourists typically first visit on their way to a tourist attraction or tourism region. The term is similar in concept to a gateway city, which describes a city that serves as a primary point-of-entry to a region, usually in terms of migration.

== Description ==
Tourist gateways may not offer significant attractions themselves. Although the term suggests that they must be passed through en route, a gateway may not be the only way to reach the tourist destination. They may be the last, largest or only settlement en route to the tourist attraction or in a tourism region, the closest in proximity to, or the first encountered within a tourism region. As such, tourist gateways are often associated with a major international or domestic airport, major road, railway station or seaport.

Sometimes the terms are used in the context of information, such as websites that tourist visit in order to find out more about attractions and regions.

== Attraction ==
Tourist gateways, unlike tourist destinations, may have developed a niche in their economy for the role or may have degrees of dependency on the tourist attraction or region for economic development. As such the focus of their tourism promotion is on their role in the provision of related services, such as transport, accommodation and hospitality. Sometimes these services can be in direct competition with those offered at the tourist attractions themselves.

Tourist gateways may also be associated with roadside attractions and tourist traps. Often, tourist gateways are associated with a moniker such as "Gateway to the ..."; for example, Gateway to the West.

== Examples ==
=== Americas ===
- Williams, Arizona – gateway to the Grand Canyon
- Iquitos, Peru – gateway to the Amazon rainforest
- Ushuaia, Argentina – gateway to Antarctica
- Green Bay and Algoma – gateways to Door County, Wisconsin

=== Australia ===
- Alice Springs, Northern Territory – gateway to the Red Centre and Uluru
- Torquay, Victoria – gateway to the Great Ocean Road
- Stawell, Victoria – gateway to the Grampians National Park
- Karratha, Western Australia – gateway to the Pilbara
- Broome, Western Australia – gateway to the Kimberley
- Cairns, Queensland – gateway to the Great Barrier Reef
- Ballarat, Victoria – gateway to the Goldfields region of Victoria
- Bright, Victoria – gateway to the Australian Alps
- Devonport, Tasmania – gateway to Tasmania

=== Europe ===
- Zürich – gateway to the Alps

== See also ==
- Tunnels Beaches
