= Ilfracombe Cemetery =

Cemetery in Devon, England

Coordinates: 51.2013°N 4.1175°W

The chapel for Ilfracombe Cemetery

Ilfracombe Cemetery (official known as the Marlborough Road Cemetery) is the burial ground for the town of Ilfracombe in Devon in the United Kingdom. The cemetery is owned and maintained by North Devon Council.

Located on the town's Marlborough Road, the cemetery is 8.88 acres in size and came into operation in 1926, with the first burial taking place on 22 April 1926. The cemetery features a variety of grave types in a mature landscaped setting, including areas for the burial or scattering of ashes and the burial of children. The cemetery has a small chapel where funeral services can be held. The cemetery has 19 war graves from World War II all of which are maintained by the Commonwealth War Graves Commission.

The cemetery is not to be confused with the older and now abandoned and overgrown Score Woods Cemetery in Ilfracombe.

== Gallery ==
The cemetery gates

A view across the cemetery
