= Verity (statue) =

Sculpture by Damien Hirst

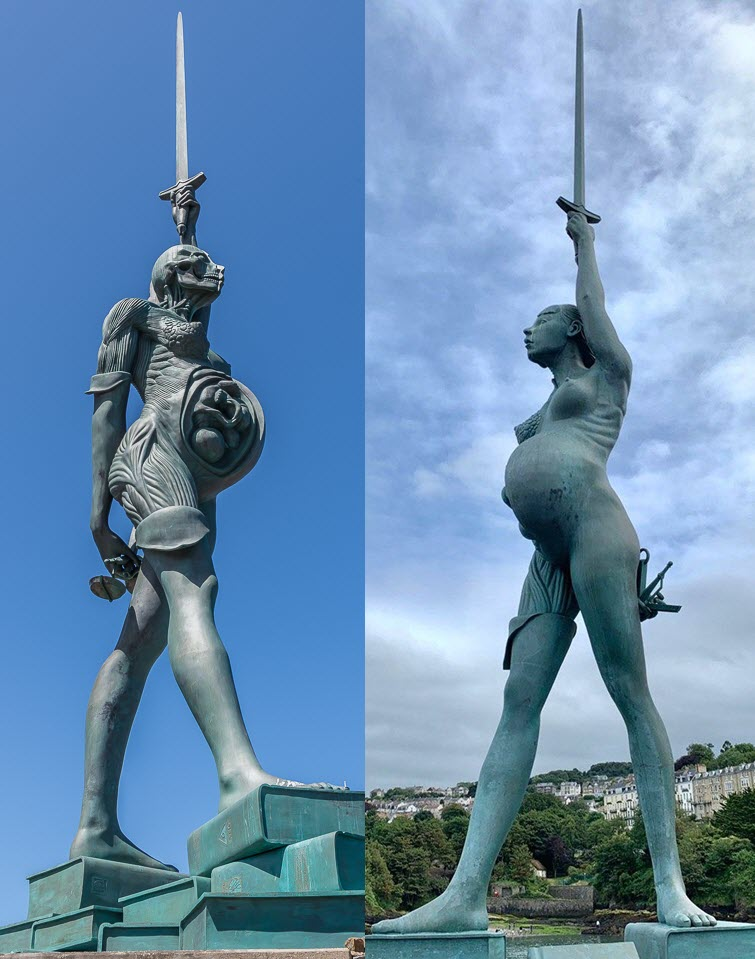
- Artist: Damien Hirst
- Year: 2012; 14 years ago
- Type: stainless steel, bronze, fibre glass
- Location: Ilfracombe, Devon; 51°12′39″N 4°06′42″W

Verity is a 2012 stainless steel and bronze statue created by Damien Hirst. The 20.25-metre (66.4 ft) tall sculpture stands on the pier at the entrance to the harbour in Ilfracombe, Devon, looking out over the Bristol Channel towards South Wales. It has been loaned to the town for 20 years. The name of the piece refers to "truth" and Hirst describes his work as a "modern allegory of truth and justice".

The statue depicts a pregnant woman holding aloft a sword while carrying the scales of justice and standing on a pile of law books. Half of the sculpture shows the internal anatomy of the pregnant woman, with the foetus clearly visible. The stance has been described as a reference to Little Dancer of Fourteen Years by Edgar Degas, a c. 1880 work that previously inspired Hirst when he created Virgin Mother, another massive sculpture of a pregnant woman with her foetus exposed.

The sculpture was cast in stainless steel and bronze in 40 separate sections by the Pangolin Editions foundry in Stroud. The sword, which gives the statue much of its height, and the upper left arm is one fibreglass piece. Measuring 25 cm (10 inches) higher than the Angel of the North, Verity became the tallest statue in the UK when it was put into place, but is now surpassed by The Kelpies, near Falkirk, Scotland, at 30 metres (98 ft).

Members of North Devon Council referred to the controversial nature of the statue as a potential boost to tourism. In August 2013 councillors announced that the statue had a "tremendous effect" with people visiting the town solely to see Hirst's work.

Hirst, who lives in Ilfracombe, has loaned the statue to the town for 20 years starting from its erection on 16 October 2012.

== See also ==
- Pregnancy in art
