= Old Town Hall, Ilfracombe =

Municipal building in Devon, England

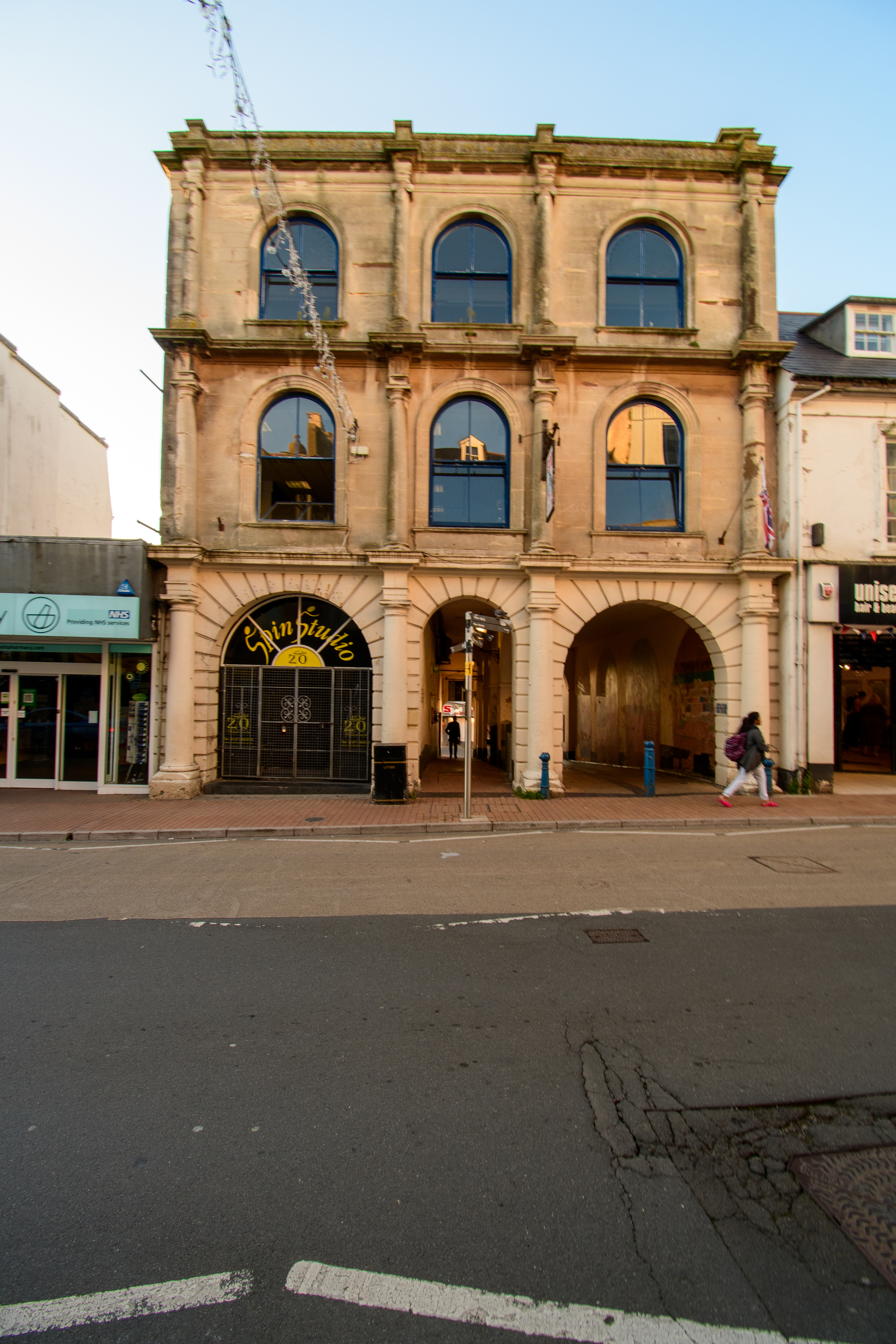
- Old Town Hall, Ilfracombe

- Shown in Devon
- 51.2087°N 4.1223°W
- Location: High Street, Ilfracombe

History
- Built: 1862

Site notes
- Architectural style: Italianate style

Listed Building – Grade II
- Official name: No. 20 and the Old Town Hall
- Designated: 23 February 1978
- Reference no.: 1293104

The Old Town Hall is a former municipal building in the High Street in Ilfracombe, Devon, England. The structure, which currently operates as gym, is a Grade II listed building.

== History ==
Following significant population growth, largely associated with the status of Ilfracombe as a market town, a local board of health was established for the area in 1851. The new board decided to commission a town hall to serve as its headquarters: the site it selected was on the north side of the High Street. The new building was designed in the Italianate style, built in Bath stone and was officially opened in 1863.

The design involved a symmetrical main frontage of three bays facing onto the High Street. The building was arcaded on the ground floor so that pedestrians and horse-drawn vehicles could pass through vaulted passageways to the long pannier market stretching down to Wilder Road behind. The ground floor, which was rusticated, featured three openings (one for pedestrians and two for vehicles) flanked by Doric order columns supporting a cornice, while the first and second floors were fenestrated by round headed windows with architraves also flanked by Doric order columns supporting cornices. There was a parapet above the second floor cornice.

Following the opening of Ilfracombe railway station in 1874, the London and South Western Railway erected an indicator board at the town hall advising platform numbers and the destination of the trains using those platforms. The area was reconstituted as an urban district, with its offices and meeting place at the town hall, in 1894. In June 1902, at a meeting held in the town hall, the council decided that 1,600 medals should be made and distributed to children, to commemorate the end of the Second Boer War, and in July 1915, the town hall was the venue for a display of images of 385 local service personnel serving in the First World War.

The building remained the local seat of government until 1931, when the urban district council relocated to the west wing of the Ilfracombe Hotel on Wilder Road. The First World War images were transferred to the Ilfracombe Hotel at that time and formed part of the initial collection of the Ilfracombe Museum. The town hall sold shortly thereafter, and during the Second World War, it served as a NAAFI Club.

By the early 21st century, the building was re-purposed again, with the upper floors becoming a badminton court, and then a gym, known as Studio 20.
