= MS Oldenburg =

Lundy Island passenger and supply ship

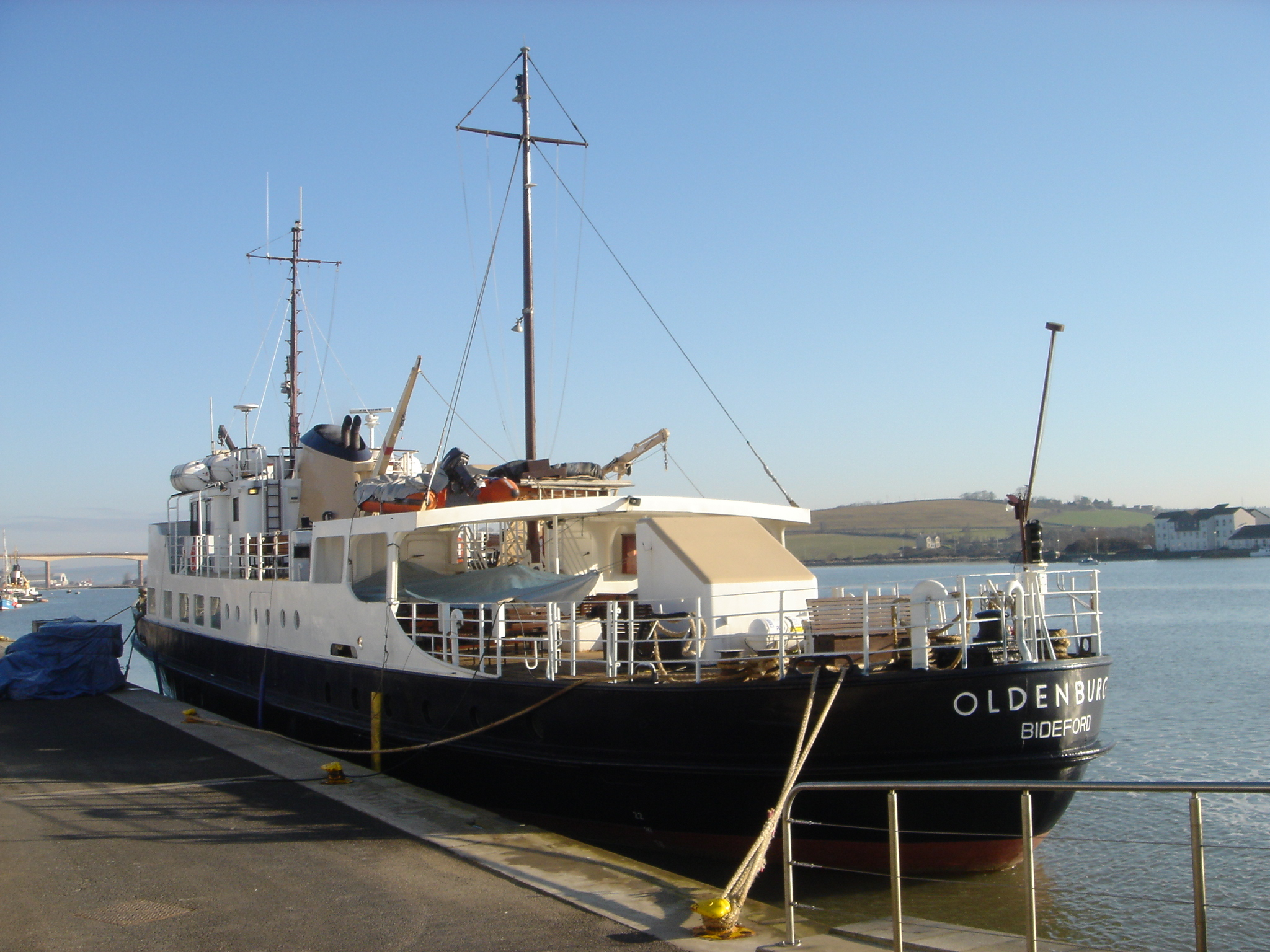
- MS Oldenburg at Bideford, Devon, March 2006

History

United Kingdom
- Name: Oldenburg
- Namesake: Oldenburg
- Owner: The Lundy Company
- Operator: Landmark Trust
- Port of registry: Bideford
- Route: Lundy, Bideford and Ilfracombe
- Acquired: November 1985
- Refit: 1999
- Home port: Bideford
- Identification: IMO number: 5262146; MMSI number: 234990000; Callsign: GFTN
- Status: in active service

History

Germany
- Name: Oldenburg
- Namesake: Oldenburg
- Owner: Deutsche Bundesbahn, Reederei Warrings (from 1982)
- Operator: Reederei Warrings (from 1975)
- Route: Wangerooge and Helgoland
- Builder: Detlef Hegemann Rolandwerft
- Yard number: 872
- Launched: 29 March 1958
- In service: 6 August 1958
- Fate: Sold to The Lundy Co. Ltd in 1985

General characteristics
- Tonnage: 294 GRT
- Length: 43.46 m (142 ft 7 in)
- Beam: 7.83 m (25 ft 8 in)
- Draught: 1.65 m (5 ft 5 in)
- Propulsion: 2 × 8-cylinder MWM engines (1958); 2 × Cummins KT19-M425 diesel engines (1999)
- Speed: 11.5 knots (21.3 km/h; 13.2 mph) (1958); 12.5 knots (23.2 km/h; 14.4 mph) (1999)
- Capacity: 359 (1958); 267 (1999)

MS Oldenburg is a British passenger ferry serving the island of Lundy in the Bristol Channel.

The Oldenburg was named after the former grand duchy of Oldenburg, Germany, and launched on 29 March 1958 in Bremen. On 6 August, she was delivered to Deutsche Bundesbahn Schiffsdienst Wangerooge, and used for a ferry service between the mainland and the Frisian island of Wangerooge.

She was first chartered in winter of 1975 by Reederei Warrings for duty-free shopping cruises in East Frisia. In 1982 she was sold to Harle-Reederei Warrings in Carolinensiel, Lower Saxony, Germany.

In November 1985 she was sold to The Lundy Co. Ltd. to replace Lundy's transport boat, the Polar Bear. After a refurbishment at Appledore Shipbuilders including fitting a new crane and bringing the ship up to modern British shipping standards, she began her journeys for passengers and supplies to the island of Lundy in May 1986, under the management of the owner's parent, Landmark Trust.

In 1999, the Lundy Co. Ltd received a Heritage Lottery Fund Grant which was used to upgrade the ship with two new 6-cylinder Cummins KT19-M425 diesel engines, each capable of producing 317 kW (425HP) at 1800RPM, increasing her top speed from 11.5 to 12.5 knots. The grant was also used to construct a new aft canopy and undertake a refurbishment programme, bringing the total passenger capacity count to 267.

Every year, the MS Oldenburg enters Sharpness docks for her annual refit. During these refits, essential maintenance is carried out in dry dock which are not possible during the sailing season. During the late 2019 refit, MS Oldenburg was fitted with a new rudder stock and foredeck crane, replacing the crane installed at the beginning of her Lundy tenure in 1986.

== Gallery ==
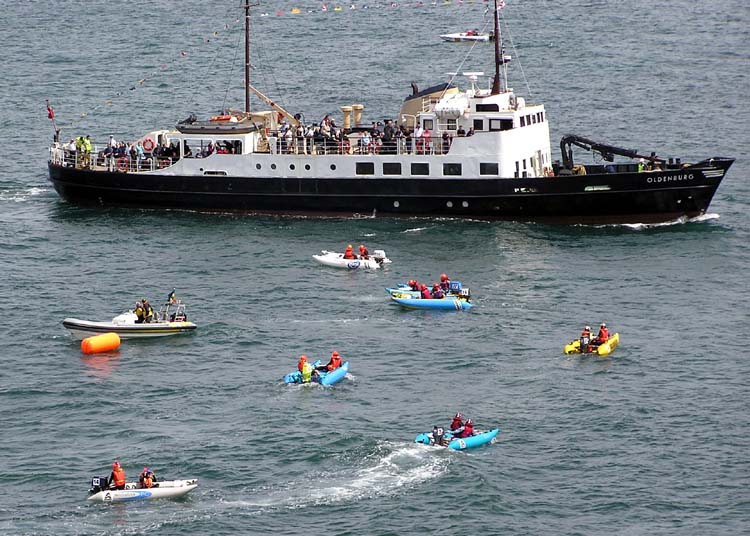
Oldenburg in Bideford Harbour

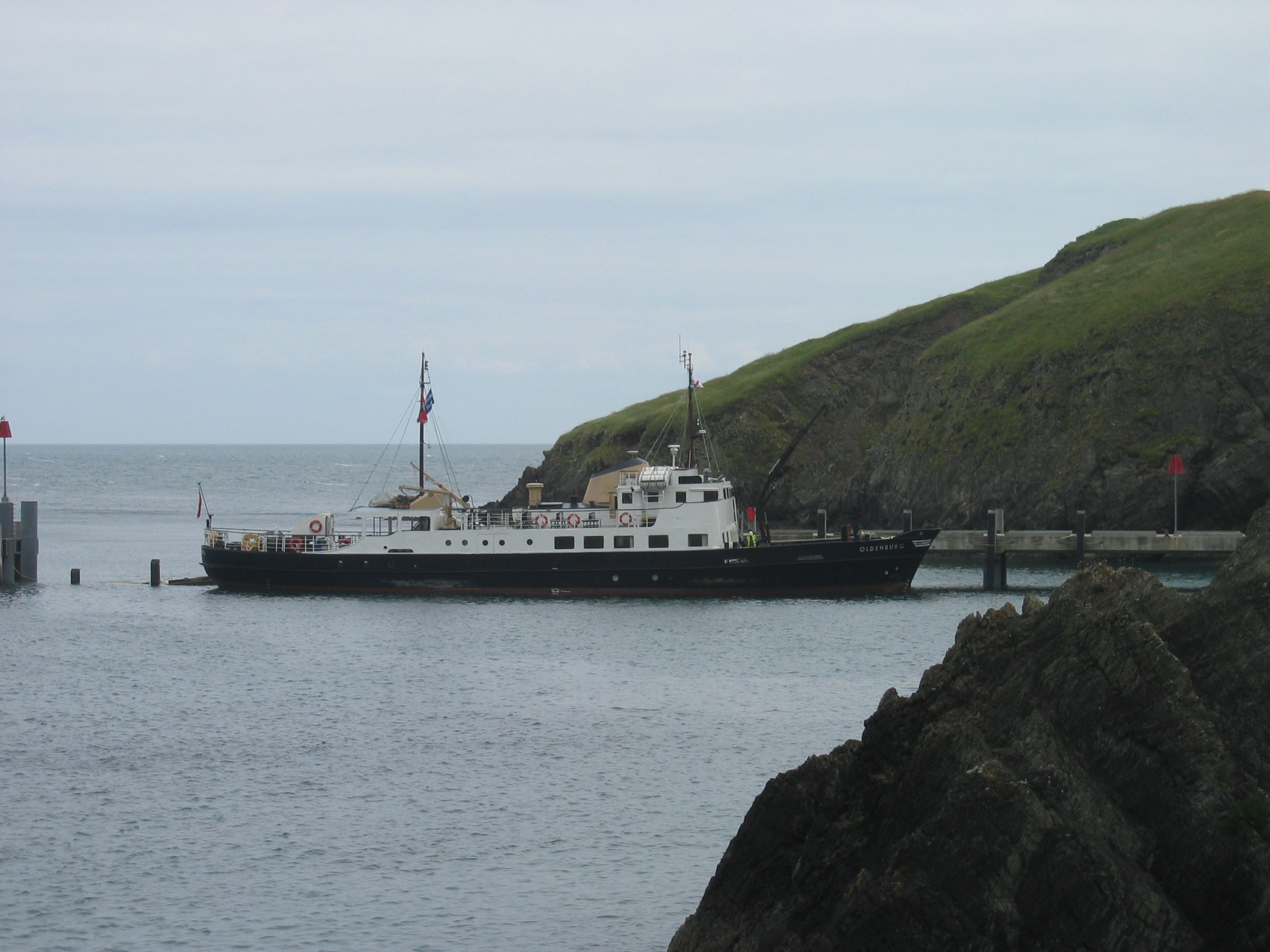
Oldenburg at Lundy Island

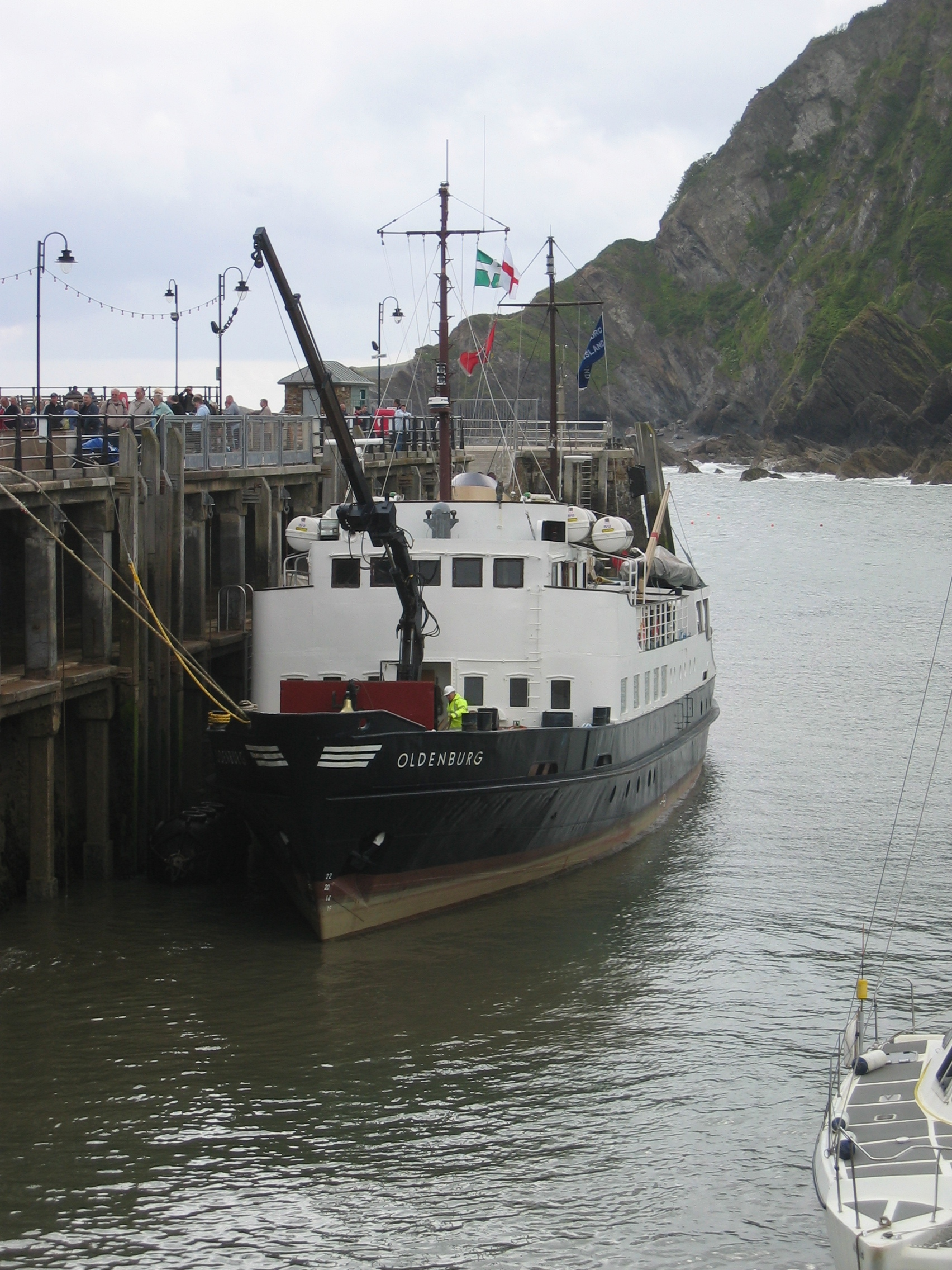
Oldenburg moored at Ilfracombe

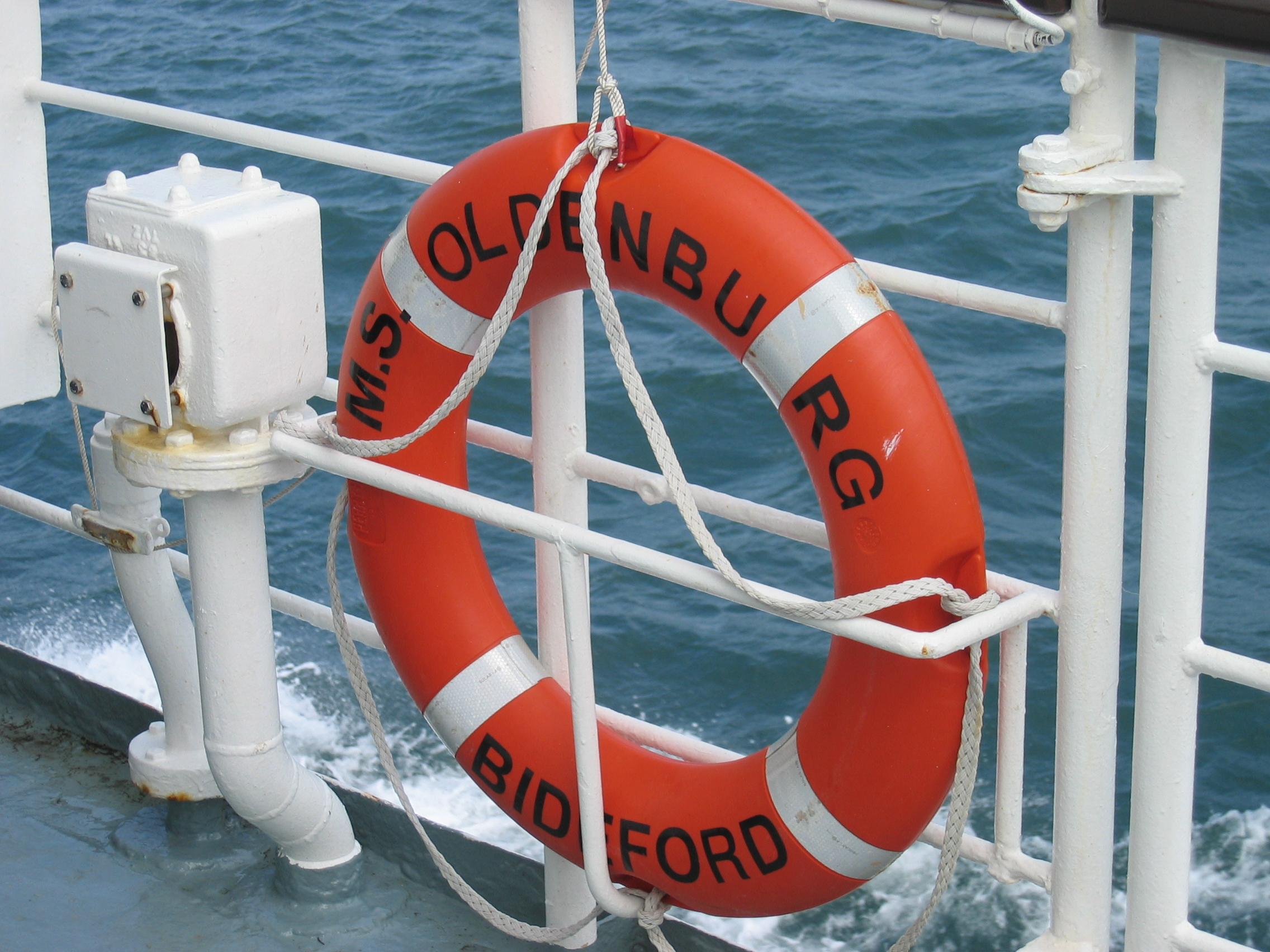
Oldenburg lifebelt
