= Tunnels Beaches =

Coves in Ilfracombe, Devon

Coordinates: 51.2110°N 4.1259°W

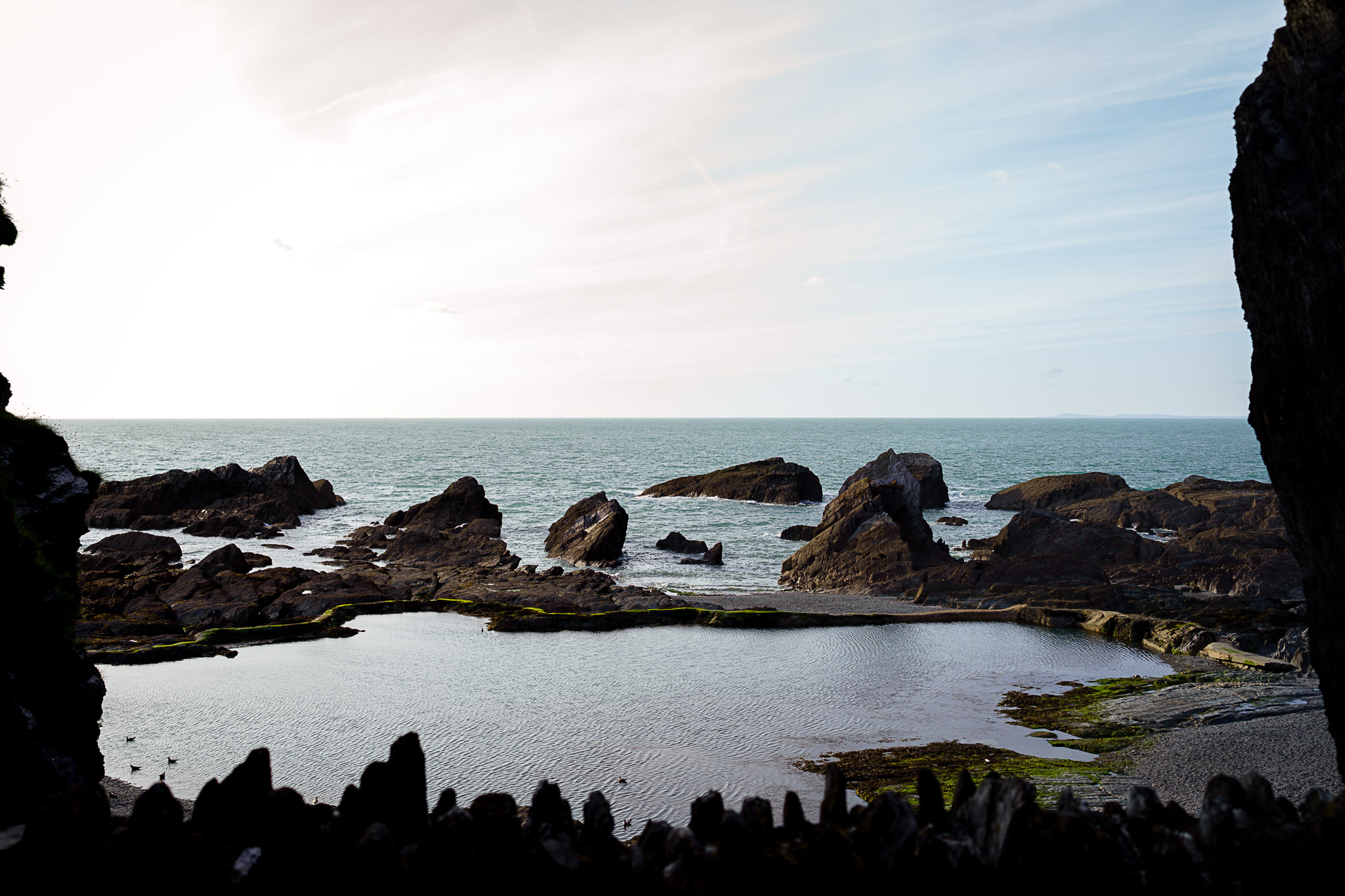
Tunnels Beaches tidal pool, only visible at lower tides.

The Tunnels Beaches are a set of coves in Ilfracombe, Devon, reachable from land only through tunnels cut through the rock. They are a local tourist attraction.

The tunnels were excavated by the Ilfracombe Sea Bathing Company in the 1820s.
