= Landmark Theatre, Devon =

Theatre in Devon, England

Coordinates: 51.21040°N 4.12287°W

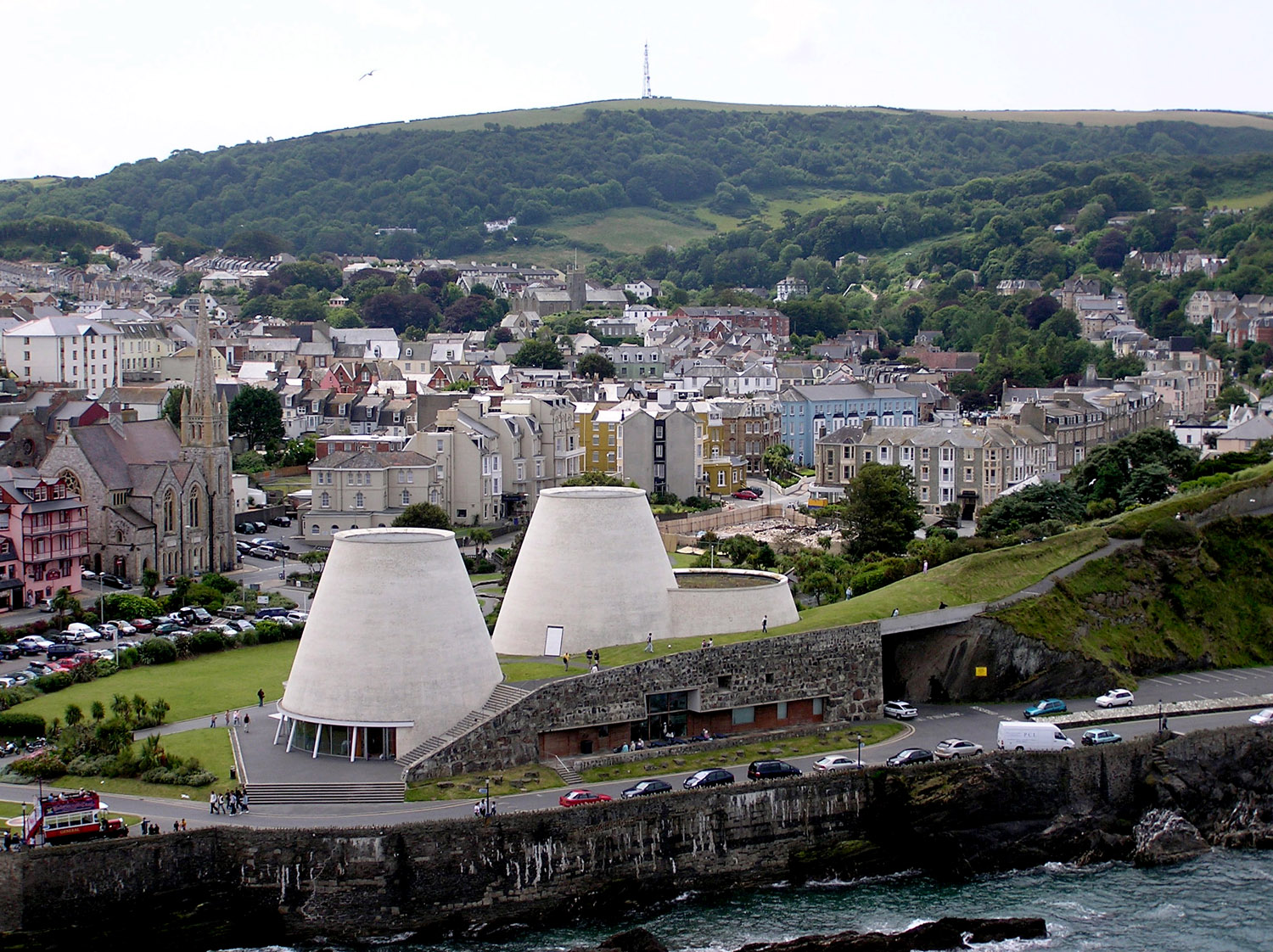
The Landmark Theatre

The Landmark Theatre is a theatre in the North Devon coastal town of Ilfracombe. It has a distinctive double-conical design. It was built to replace The Pavilion Theatre, a Victorian building partly destroyed in a fire during the 1980s and later demolished.

On 23 January 2017, it was announced that the operator of the theatre, North Devon Theatres Trust, had gone into administration. Parkwood Theatres were appointed as a temporary operator until the end of March 2018.

On 23 November 2018, it was announced that Selladoor Worldwide had been awarded a ten-year contract to manage the venue.
