= List of people from Ilfracombe =

Ilfracombe is a town on the North Devon coast. This is a list of notable individuals who are associated with Ilfracombe in some way, listed alphabetically within categories.

== Academics ==
- Thomas Harriot (c. 1560 – 1621) – the quintessential Renaissance Scholar, who in September 1607 observed a comet from Ilfracombe which would later be identified as Halley's Comet.

== Actors/Actresses ==
- Peter Sellers (1925 – 1980) – where he first set foot on stage
- Joan Collins (born 1933) - actress, author and columnist, went to school locally
- Jackie Collins (1937 – 2015) - romance novelist and actress, went to school locally

== Architects ==
- George Wightwick (1802 – 1872) - architect and possibly the first architectural journalist, designed nearby Watermouth Castle.

== Artists ==
- Frank McEwen (1907 – 1994) – founder and Director of National Gallery of Zimbabwe, then called, the National Gallery of Rhodesia. Retired to Ilfracombe before his death.
- Damien Hirst (born 1965) - artist and art collector, local patron, funder of two local restaurants, various properties and local farms
- George Shaw (born 1966) - artist, Turner prize shortlisted in 2011, has studio on Ilfracombe High St

== Explorers ==
- Thomas Stukley (c. 1525 – 1578) – an English adventurer who served in combat in France, Ireland, and at the Battle of Lepanto, raised as the son of Sir Hugh Stucley, of Afheton, near Ilfracombe

== Musicians ==
- John Gardner (1917 – 2011) - composer of classical music, grew up locally.

== Naval officers ==
- Sir John Berry (c. 1636 – 1690) - an English officer of the Royal Navy.
- James Bowen (1751–1835) – British naval officer and commissioner of the Royal Navy, was master of HMS Queen Charlotte at the Glorious First of June. Captained HMS Dreadnought & HMS Argot, became rear-admiral, commanded fleet which rescued the British army from Corunna during the Napoleonic war.
- Richard Bowen (1761–1797) – British naval officer, brother of Rear-Admiral James Bowen. He served with Lord Nelson and whilst standing next to Admiral Nelson was killed during the Battle of Santa Cruz de Tenerife.
- Captain John Richards Lapenotière (1770 – 1834) – a British Royal Navy officer who commanded HMS Pickle, observed the Battle of Trafalgar on 21 October 1805, participated in the rescue operations which followed and then carried the dispatches of the victory and the death of Admiral Nelson to Britain.
- John Bowen (1780–1827) – a naval officer and colonial administrator born in Ilfracombe 1780, founded first British settlement of Tasmania 1803 at Risdon Cove (renamed Hobart). Married the niece of the Duchess of Clarence.

== Politicians ==
- Anna Catherine Parnell (1852 – 1911) – Irish nationalist, she drowned in the town; sister of Charles Stewart Parnell, the Irish Nationalist leader

== Sportsmen/women ==
- Stanley Cotterell (1857–1939) - founded the Bicycle Touring Club
- Jonathan Edwards (born 1966) – world champion triple jump athlete and gold medallist at the 2000 Summer Olympics
- Jason Twist (1968 – 2023) – two times world champion at eight ball pool.

== Writers ==
- Philip James Bailey (1816 – 1902) – English poet and author of Festus; lived locally
- Robert Freke Gould (1836–1915) – soldier, barrister and historian of Freemasonry
- Emilia, Lady Dilke (1840 – 1904) – British amateur author and art historian, popular writer on art, particularly French; she became a contributor to the Saturday Review in 1864.
- Coulson Kernahan (1858–1943) – English novelist, from Ilfracombe, his book God and the Ant sold more than a million copies.
- James Allen (1864 – 1912) – writer of inspirational books and poetry; aged 38, he moved to a small local cottage for a simple life of contemplation where he wrote over 20 works.
- Henry Williamson (1895 – 1977) – prolific English author of natural and social history novels. He lived in a small cottage in the town.
