= Hele Bay =

Village and beach in Devon, England

Coordinates: 51.209°N 4.099°W

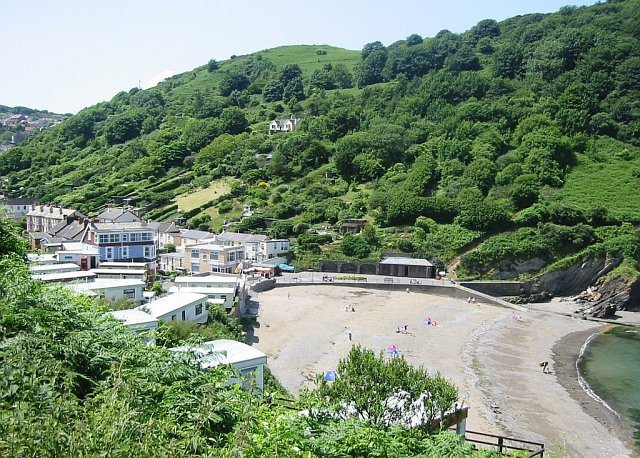

- Location within Devon
- OS grid reference: SS535476
- Civil parish: Ilfracombe
- District: North Devon
- Shire county: Devon
- Region: South West
- Country: England
- Sovereign state: United Kingdom
- Police: Devon and Cornwall
- Fire: Devon and Somerset
- Ambulance: South Western
- UK Parliament: England

Hele Bay is a small village and beach just to the east of the town of Ilfracombe in North Devon, England. It is on the South West Coast Path.

The small village of Hele is inland from the beach. Hele was listed in the Domesday Book of 1086 when the tenant-in-chief was Bishop Geoffrey of Coutances.

There is a Grade II Listed corn mill at Hele Bay that dates back to around 1525.
