= Ilfracombe =

Town in Devon, England

- Seaside town and civil parish
- Town View Watermouth Castle Ilfracombe Harbour

- Location within Devon
- Population: 11,035 (2021 census)
- OS grid reference: SS516474
- Civil parish: Ilfracombe
- District: North Devon
- Shire county: Devon
- Region: South West
- Country: England
- Sovereign state: United Kingdom
- Post town: Ilfracombe
- Postcode district: EX34
- Dialling code: 01271
- Police: Devon and Cornwall
- Fire: Devon and Somerset
- Ambulance: South Western
- UK Parliament: North Devon
- Website: visitilfracombe.co.uk

Ilfracombe (/ˈɪlfrəkuːm/ IL-frə-koom) is a seaside town and civil parish on the North Devon coast, England, with a small harbour surrounded by cliffs.

The parish stretches along the coast from the 'Coastguard Cottages' in Hele Bay toward the east and 4 miles (6 km) along the Torrs to Lee Bay toward the west. The resort is hilly and the highest point within the parish boundary is 'Hore Down Gate', 2 miles (3 km) inland and 860 feet (270 m) above sea level.

The landmark of Hillsborough Hill dominates the harbour and is the site of an Iron Age fortified settlement. In the built environment, the architectural-award-winning Landmark Theatre has a distinctive double-conical design. The 13th-century parish church, Holy Trinity, and the St Nicholas's Chapel (a lighthouse) on Lantern Hill, have been joined by Damien Hirst's statue of Verity as points of interest.

== History ==
Ilfracombe has been settled since the Iron Age, when the Dumnonii (the Roman name for the inhabitants of the South-West) established a hill fort on the dominant hill, Hillsborough (formerly Hele's Barrow). The origin of the town's name has two possible sources. The first is that it is a derivative of the Anglo-Saxon Alfreinscoma - by which name it was noted in the Liber Exoniensis of 1086. The translation of this name (from Walter William Skeat of the department of Anglo Saxon at Cambridge University) means the "Valley of the sons of Alfred". The second origin is that the name Ilfracombe was derived from Norse illf (bad), Anglo-Saxon yfel (evil ford) and Anglo-Saxon cumb (valley) perhaps from a Celtic source (compare Welsh cwm), thus 'The valley with the bad ford'.

The manor house at Chambercombe in east Ilfracombe was recorded in the 1086 Domesday Book as being built by a Norman knight Champernon (from Chambernon in France) who landed with William of Normandy. It is also said to be haunted.

Ilfracombe comprised two distinct communities; a farming community around the parish church called Holy Trinity, parts of which date from the 12th century, and a fishing community around the natural harbour formed between Capstone, Compass and Lantern Torrs. It is recorded that the lands by the church were part of the estate owned by Champernowne family, while those by the harbour belonged to the Bouchier family: Earls of Bath.

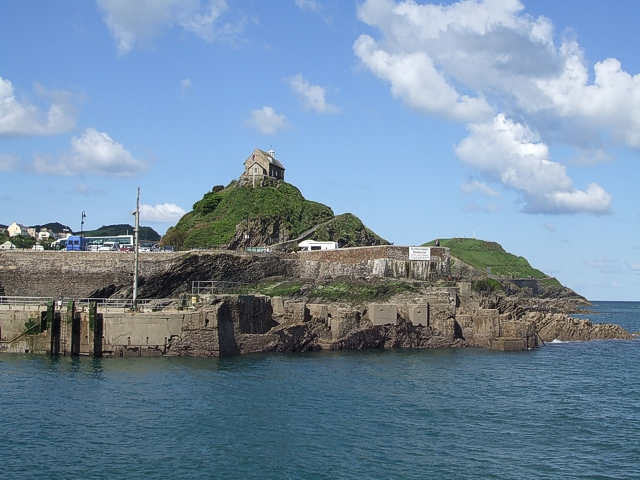
St Nicholas's Chapel on Lantern Hill

Because of the natural layout of the harbour, Ilfracombe became a significant safe port (registered port of refuge) on the Bristol Channel. It also had trade routes between Kinsale and Tenby, which made the port stronger. In 1208 it was listed as having provided King John with ships and men to invade Ireland; in 1247 it supplied a ship to the fleet that was sent to conquer the Western Isles of Scotland; 6 ships, with 79 men were sent to support the siege of Calais. Ilfracombe was the last disembarkation point for two large forces sent to subdue the Irish. The building which sits on Lantern Hill by the harbour, known as St Nicholas's Chapel (built 1361) is reputed to be the oldest working lighthouse in the UK; a light/beacon has been there for over 650 years.

The town was also home to the Bowen family. James Bowen was sailing master of HMS Queen Charlotte, the flagship of Richard, Earl Howe at the 1794 "Glorious First of June" battle. James Bowen was commissioned by Howe for his leadership in the battle. He rose through the levels - commander of HMS Argo, Dreadnought, and in Georgian England titled "defender of Madeira", led the fleet which rescued the British Army at Corunna in the Peninsular War. For his skill in saving the Peninsula army from Napoleon's forces, he was presented to a joint meeting of the Upper and Lower Houses of Parliament to receive the rare honour of record of "grateful thanks of the nation". He retired as a Rear Admiral and Commissioner of the Royal Navy. Captain Richard Bowen (1761–97) James Bowen's younger brother, a commander on HMS Terpsichore, served under Lord Nelson and was killed at the Battle of Santa Cruz de Tenerife (1797). John Bowen (1780–1827), son of Admiral James Bowen, was a naval officer and colonial administrator. He founded the first settlement of Tasmania at Risdon Cove in 1803 - the settlement that later became known as Hobart. Captain John Bowen married Queen Charlotte's niece.

Lieutenant A E Down was initially posted to Ilfracombe to lead a protection ship for HM Customs and Excise. He married a local girl and rose through the officers' ranks to retire as vice admiral. His son joined the navy aged 14 (his first navy kit is on display at National Maritime Museum, Greenwich). In 1802 James Meek married Down's daughter and settled in the town; James Meek was appointed the Comptroller of Victuals to the Royal Navy in 1832. He was knighted and died in Ilfracombe in 1852. (Gentlemen's Gazette)

There was a battlemented castle overlooking the harbour; of this nothing remains except contemporary records and the area designated Castle Hill off Portland Street/Montepellier Terrace.

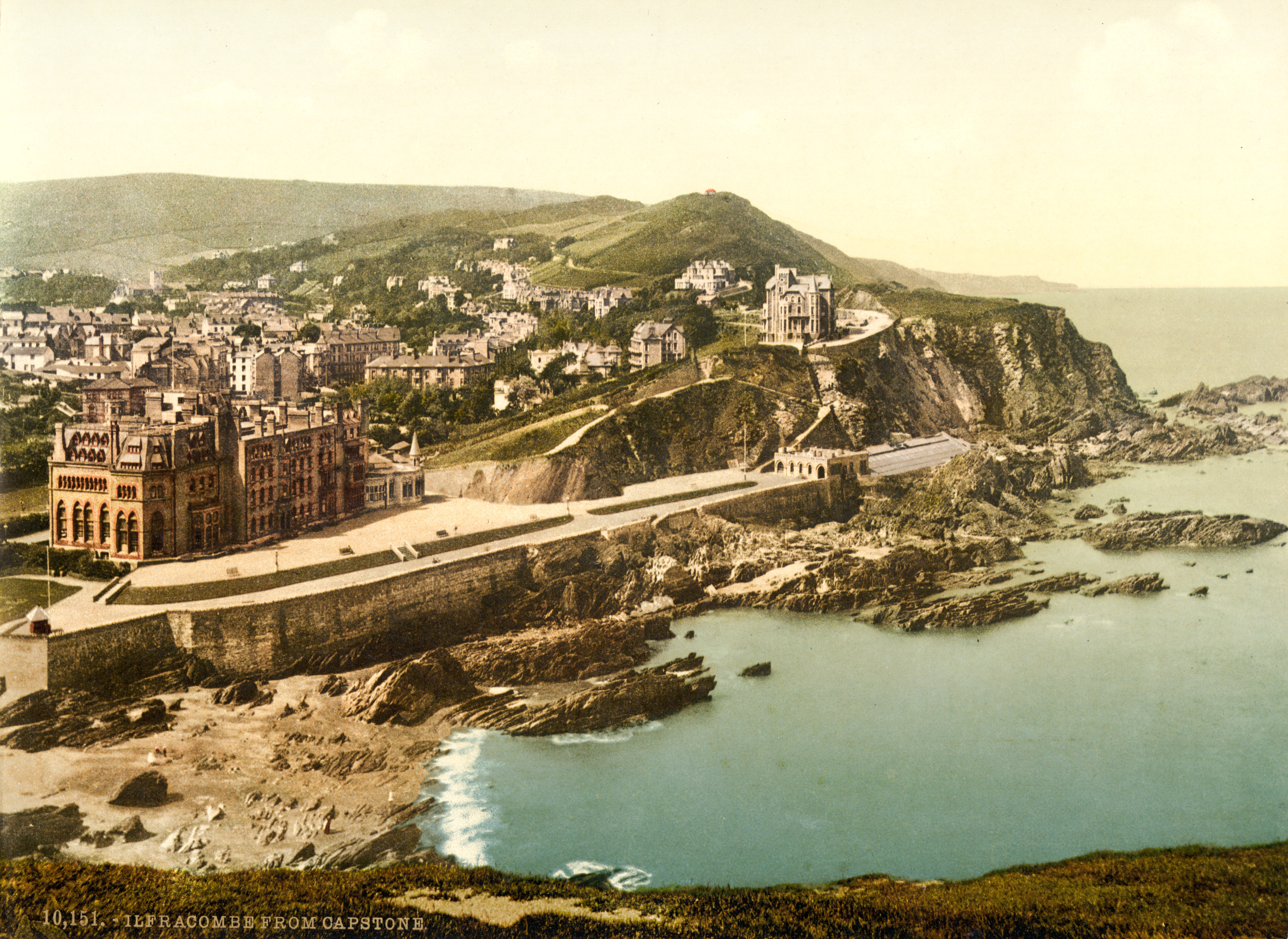
Photochrom of Ilfracombe, 1890s

The novelist Frances Burney stayed in Ilfracombe in 1817. Her diary entries (2 July – 5 October) record early 19th-century life in Ilfracombe: a captured Spanish ship; two ships in distress in a storm; the visit of Thomas Bowdler; and her lucky escape after being cut off by the tide. A few years later in the 1820s, a set of four tunnels were hand-carved by Welsh miners to permit access to the beaches by horse-drawn carriage as well as on foot. Previously access was gained by climbing the cliffs, rounding the point by boat, swimming or at the lowest tides clambering around the rocks of the point. These tunnels led to a pair of tidal pools, which in accordance with Victorian morals, were used for segregated male and female bathing. Whereas women were constrained to a strict dress code covering up the whole body, men generally swam naked. The tunnels are still viewable and are signposted as the Tunnels Beaches.

The population in the 1841 census was 2,855 inhabitants.

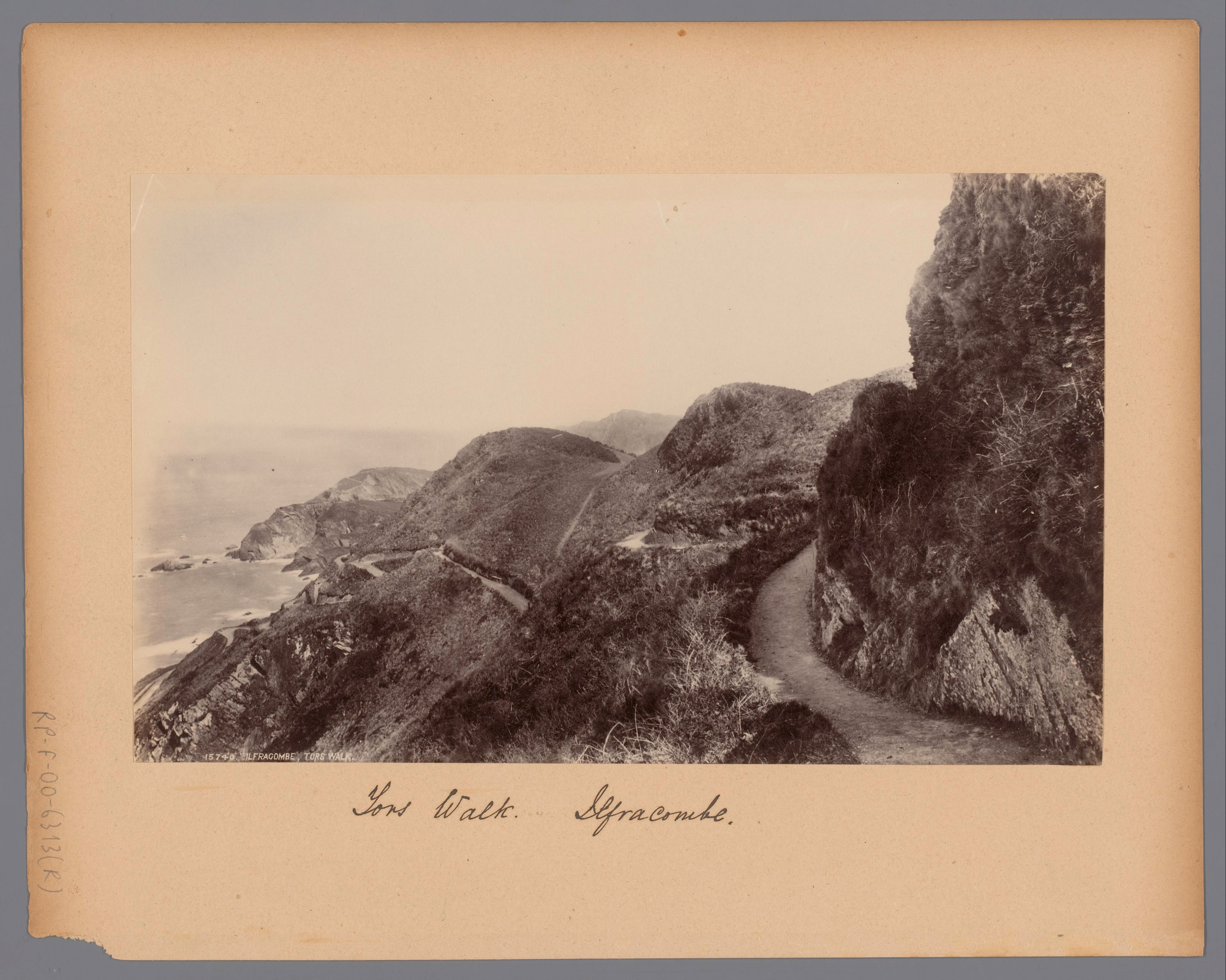
Torrs Walk, Ilfracombe by Francis Frith (1850s-1870s)

In 1856, writer Mary Ann Evans (pen-name George Eliot) accompanied George Henry Lewes to Ilfracombe to gather materials for his work Seaside Studies published in 1858. Actor Peter Sellers lived in the town when his parents managed the Gaiety Theatre; he first stepped on the stage there and reputedly played the drums. Another actor, Terry Thomas visited the town frequently to stay with his sister, and in the same period, Joan Collins and Jackie Collins were schooled here and boarded in the town. In the last two decades, the town has been home to many artists including locally Damien Hirst, and George Shaw a runner up for the Turner Prize. There is an annual art festival when local artists open their homes for visitors to see their work and 7 to 10 permanent art galleries. The town's first lifeboat was bought in 1828 but a permanent service was not available until the Royal National Lifeboat Institution built a lifeboat station at the bottom of Lantern Hill near the pier in 1866. The present station at Broad Street dates from 1996.

In 1911, the Irish nationalist Anna Catherine Parnell (sister of Charles Stewart Parnell) drowned at Ilfracombe and is buried in the churchyard at Holy Trinity.

Alice Frances Louisa Phillips (b. 26 January 1891 at 85 High Street, Ilfracombe) and her father Escott Robert Phillips (b. 1869 Cardiff) held 2nd class ticket No. 2 on the Titanic, and set sail from Southampton on 10 April 1912 heading for New Brighton, Pennsylvania. Alice was rescued in boat 12, but her father was lost in the disaster.

The Great Fire of Ilfracombe started at 12:40 a.m. on the night of 28 July 1896 in the basement of William Cole's ironmongers and furniture shop on the corner of Portland Street and Fore Street. The local volunteer fire brigade had it under control by the following morning. The fire brigade's entire equipment was a manual Merryweather engine, a hose-reel cart and one telescopic ladder on wheels. In total thirty five houses and business premises and their contents were destroyed. Later that year the fire brigade crew were presented with medals and £2 each at a dinner in their honour at the Royal Clarence Hotel. The damage was estimated at the times at between £80,000 and £100,000. The same area of the town was evacuated on 12 December 1981 when a fire in Draper's paint store released fumes. A much larger fire started on the night of 2 September 1983 in the shopping arcade under the Candar Hotel, with one life was lost.

On 8 August 2006, a fire broke out at the derelict Montebello Hotel in Fore Street. Twenty fire engines were required to put out the blaze, including a number from Woolacombe, Barnstaple and Somerset. Specialist equipment was brought in from Exeter. The fire spread to three neighbouring properties and showered debris over a wide area. The six-storey hotel was completely gutted, and the building was eventually demolished when it was determined that the fire had left it structurally unsound.

== Governance ==
Ilfracombe Town Council

Type
- Type: Civil parish

Leadership
- Mayor: Mark Gerrard Fay, Ilfracombe First

Structure
- Seats: 18
- Political groups: Ilfracombe First: 14 seats Labour Party: 2 seats Green Party: 1 seat Independent: 1 seat
- Salary: None

Elections
- Voting system: First-past-the-post

Meeting place
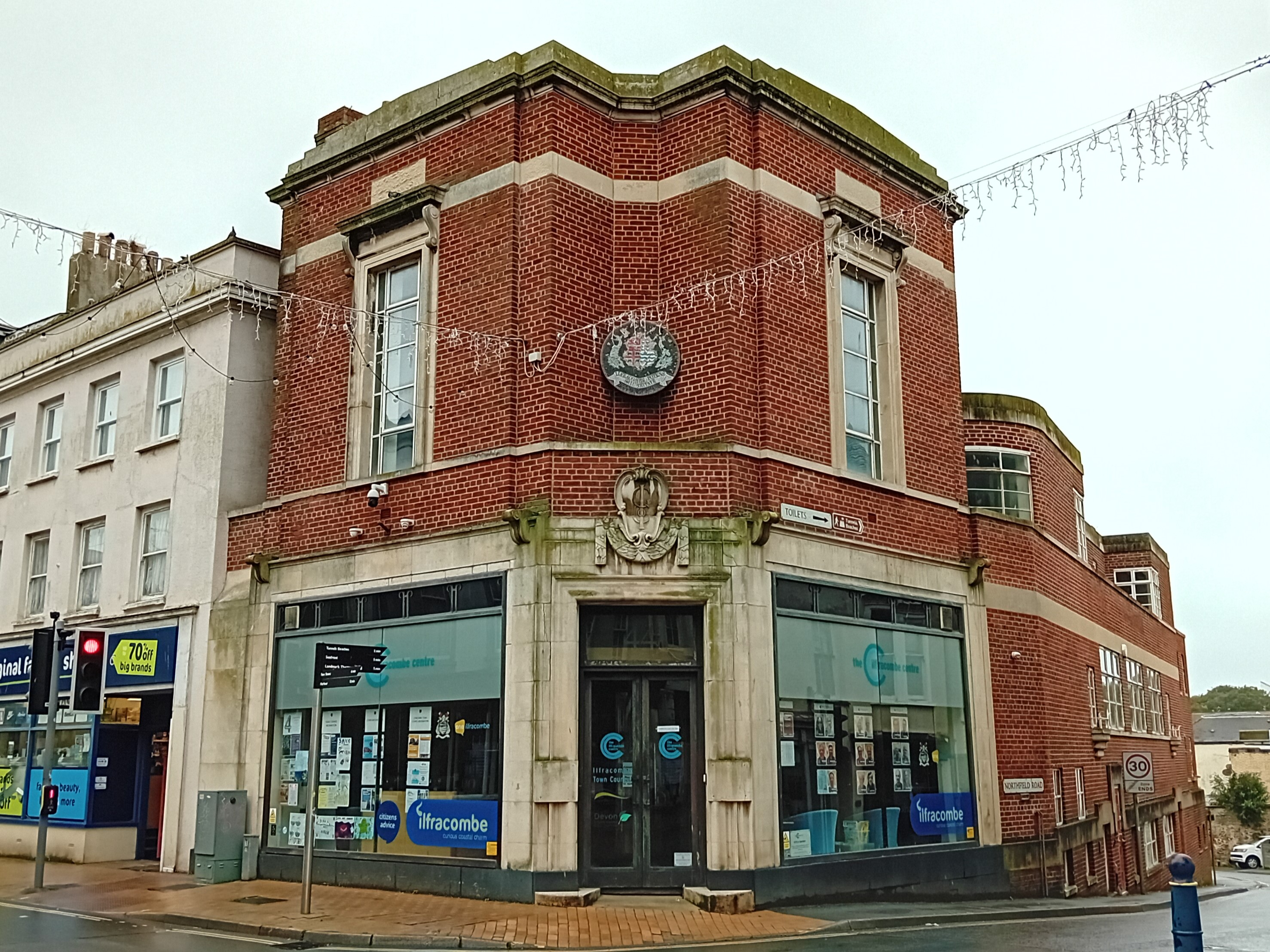
- 44 High St, Ilfracombe, EX34 9QB

Website
- ilfracombetowncouncil.gov.uk

Old Town Hall, 20 High Street, completed 1863.

There are three tiers of local government covering Ilfracombe, at parish (town), district and county level: Ilfracombe Town Council, North Devon Council (based in Barnstaple) and Devon County Council (based in Exeter). Ilfracombe Town Council is based at the Ilfracombe Centre at 44 High Street, which also serves as an area office for North Devon Council.

Ilfracombe was an ancient parish. It was also an ancient borough in the middle ages, but its borough status lapsed and it was subsequently run by its parish vestry, in the same way as most rural areas. Urban forms of local government were re-established in 1851 when a local board was created for the parish. The local board built a town hall at 20 High Street to serve as its headquarters, which was formally opened in 1863.

Local boards were reconstituted as urban district councils in 1894. Ilfracombe Urban District Council was based at the town hall until 1931, when it converted the west wing of the Ilfracombe Hotel on Wilder Road to become its offices and meeting place and sold the town hall. The urban district of Ilfracombe was abolished in 1974 under the Local Government Act 1972, with the area merging with neighbouring districts to become the new North Devon district. A successor parish was created covering the former urban district, with its council taking the name Ilfracombe Town Council. In 1997 the town council established a new headquarters at 44 High Street, which had been built in 1935 as the offices of the Ilfracombe Gas Company, naming it the Ilfracombe Centre.

The town lies within the Parliamentary constituency of North Devon. It had Liberal Democrat representation from 1992 to 2015 with MP Nick Harvey. and again since 2024 through Ian Roome.

From 2015 to 2024 it was a Conservative seat, first represented by Peter Heaton-Jones from 2015 to 2019, and after 2019 by Selaine Saxby.

The town is also twinned with Ifs in France.

== Geography ==
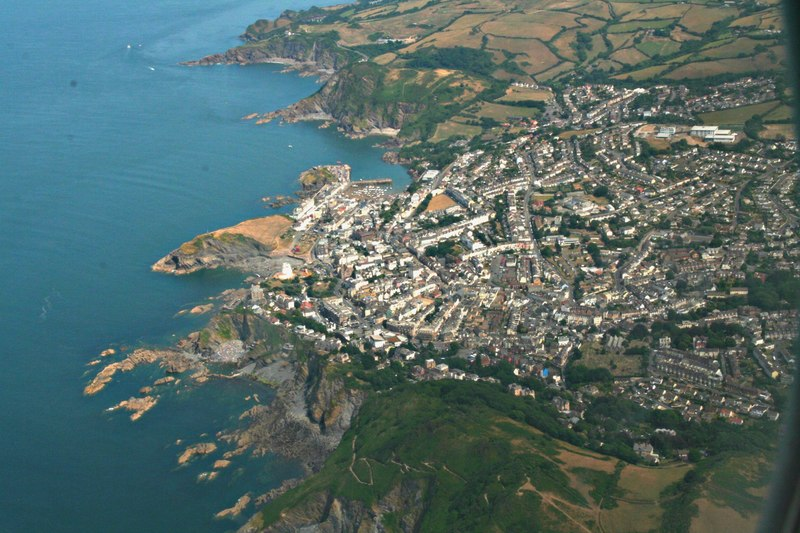
Aerial view of Ilfracombe

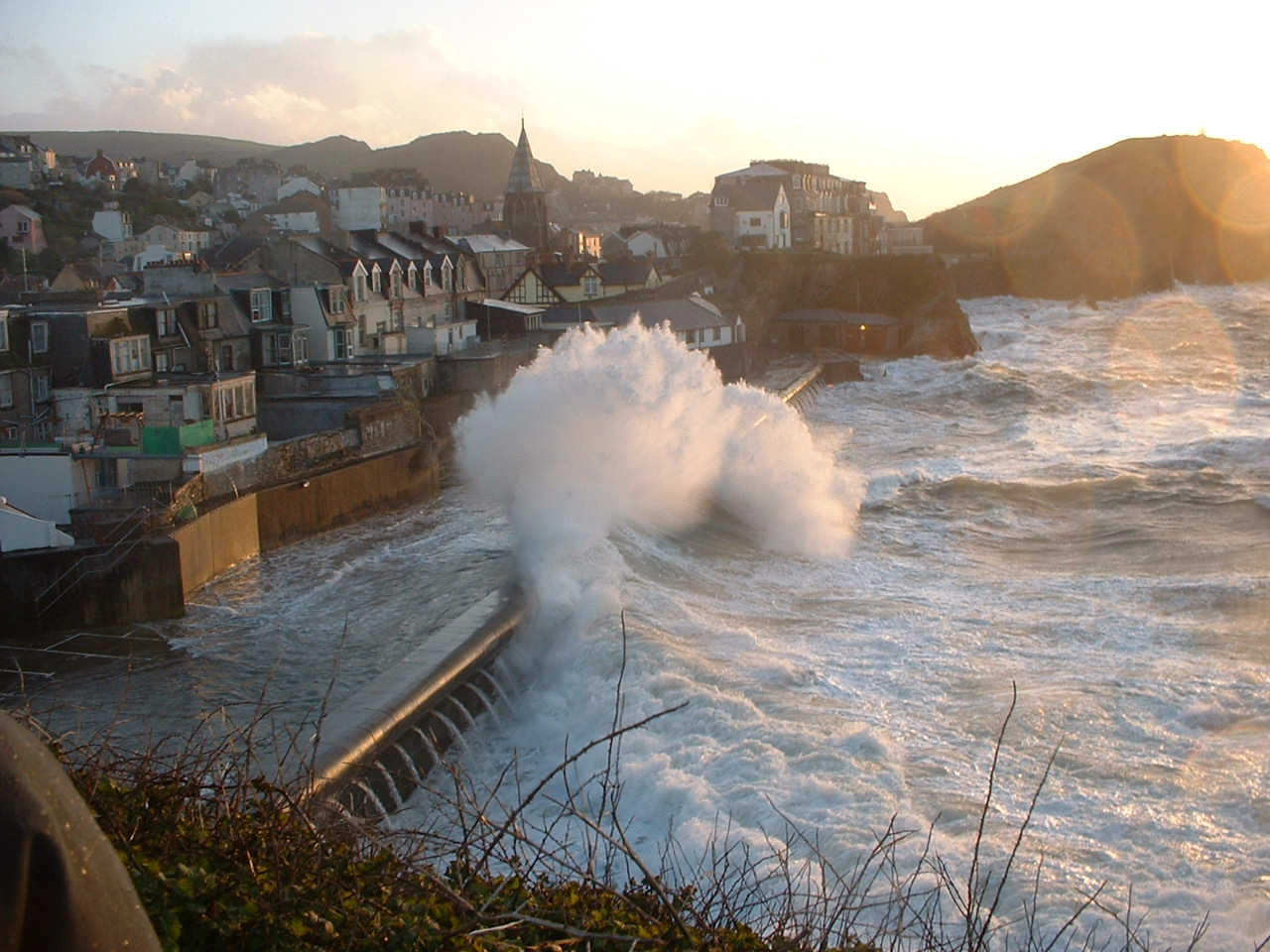
The view from St Nicholas's Chapel during a storm

Ilfracombe overlies slates formed from sedimentary rock that underwent geological stress (creating faults and folds), towards the end of the Carboniferous Period, around 300 million years ago. These are known as the Ilfracombe slates. Ilfracombe lies within the North Devon Areas of Outstanding Natural Beauty which is renowned for its dramatic coastal cliffs and landscape. Hillsborough, lying close to the town centre is a local nature reserve, and around the town are many other havens for wildlife, notable including the Cairn. The coast itself is part of the North Devon Voluntary Marine Conservation area because of its diverse and rare species.

== Demography ==
At the 2021 census, the parish of Ilfracombe had a population of 11,035 people in 5,044 households, a decrease from the recorded population of 11,509 at the 2011 Census. The Office for National Statistics also define a contiguous built-up area for Ilfracombe, excluding rural parts of the parish, which had a population of 9,200 in 2021.

Census population of Ilfracombe parish
Census	Population	Female	Male	Households	Source
2001	10,840	5,533	5,307	4,554	
2011	11,509	5,912	5,597	5,032	
2021	11,035	5,634	5,401	5,044	

== Economy ==
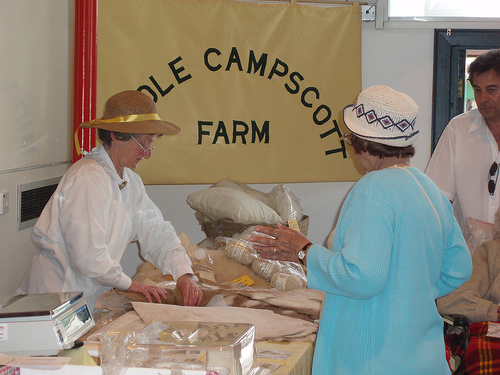
The fortnightly Ilfracombe farmers' market

Until the mid-19th century Ilfracombe's economy was based around maritime activities: importing lime and coal from Wales; fishing for herring; and international trade, including to West Africa and the West Indies.

The town gradually developed into a tourist resort served by ferries along the Bristol Channel. The opening of the railway accelerated this development. The population grew until the First World War, then stabilised at 9,200, now 11,000. The economy suffered throughout the 1960s as UK holiday patterns changed, and suffered further through the closure of the railway line in 1970.

In the last 25 years, major investment by private 'light engineering' companies has added to the economy. These companies include: Pall Europe - a filtration manufacturer, the European headquarters TDK-Lambda, a subsidiary of the TDK Corporation, which manufactures industrial & medical power supplies. A number of light engineering firms provide additional employment and operate within a couple of miles of the town centre at Mullacott Cross. There are 3 deep-sea fishing boats which sail from the port and several inshore boats which farm the local lobster, crabs and whelks. There are many private charters, sea cruise and coastal tour boat operators sailing from the harbour.

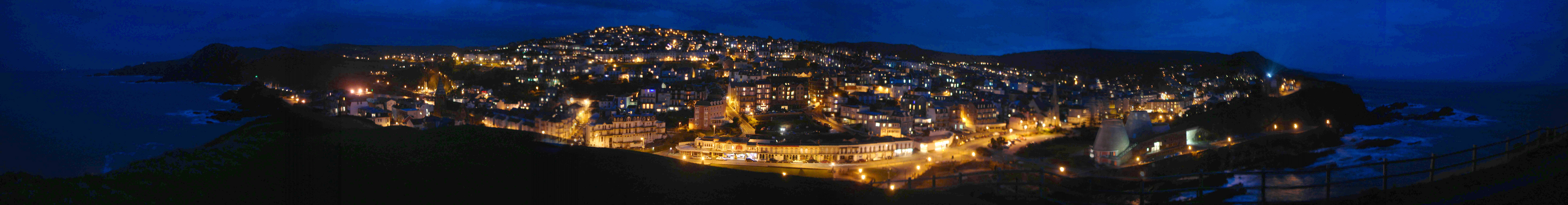
Panoramic view of Ilfracombe seafront, winter night time
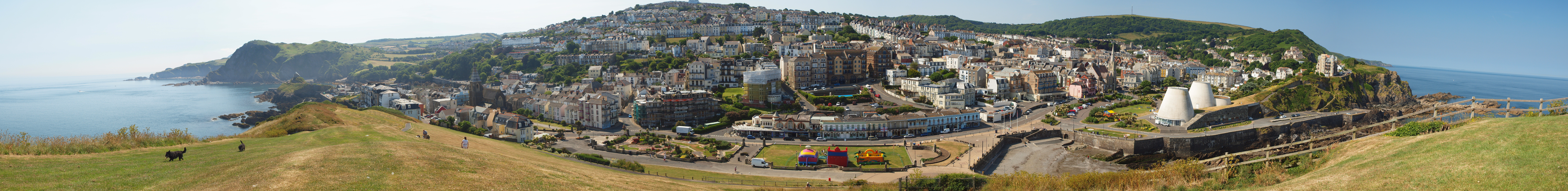
Panoramic view of Ilfracombe seafront, summer day time

== Transport ==
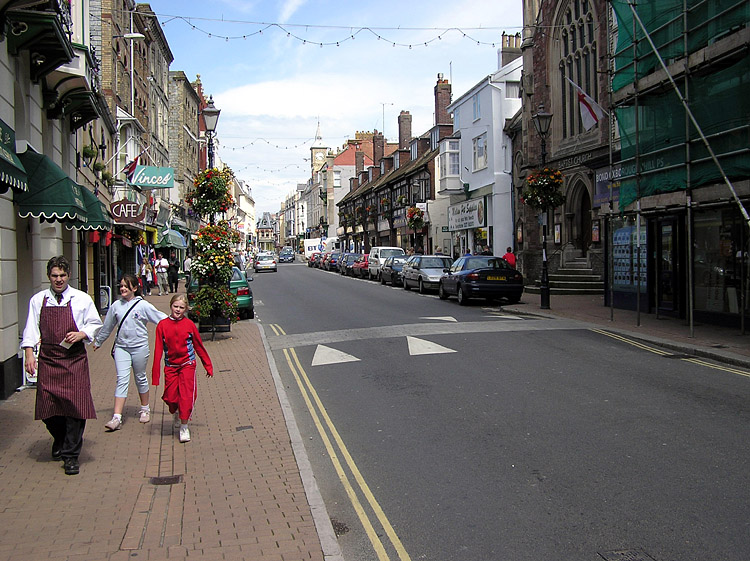
High Street, Ilfracombe

Ilfracombe is at the southern end of the A361, the longest 3-digit A-road in England which finishes on the A5 at Kilsby on the Northamptonshire-Warwickshire border near Rugby and is the town's main connection with the South West England motorway, the M5.

From 1874, Ilfracombe was served by the Ilfracombe railway line that ran from Barnstaple, but this closed in 1970. Now, the nearest National Rail railway station is in Barnstaple and buses provide the public transport link from there to Ilfracombe. There are a number of regular bus services operating from Ilfracombe. These include:

- Stagecoach 21B: Ilfracombe - Braunton - Barnstaple Bus Station - Barnstaple Rail Station
- Taw & Torridge 31: Ilfracombe - Woolacombe - Morthoe
- Stagecoach 301: Barnstaple - North Devon Hospital - Ilfracombe - Watermouth Castle - Combe Martin

There are also several smaller routes around the town run by the local operator Independent Coach Company.

=== Ferry ===
The first steam packets arrived at Ilfracombe in 1823, and soon regular services to Bristol and Swansea were established. On 16 May 1873, a wooden promenade pier was opened to allow the pleasure steamers to berth at all tides. On 23 June 1894, it was reported in the Ilfracombe Chronicle that over 2,500 people arrived in no less than seven boats, it describes them as 'commodious and well-appointed vessels with an excellent reputation for speed and comfort.' As well as holidaymakers, the boats carried workers, live and dead stock and other merchandise to and from the town.

The PS Waverley (1885) arrived in Ilfracombe in 1887, after her owners P & A Campbell brought her to Bristol, initially on a charter, as their first pleasure steamer to work the Bristol Channel, and was based there until 1917. Deterioration of the wooden pier and part demolition during the Second World War mean that a new pier was required. The wood was replaced with reinforced concrete and car parking space was increased. The new pier was opened on 6 July 1952.

A seasonal passenger ferry, operated by MS Oldenburg, connects the harbour to Lundy Island. Pleasure boats, including MV Balmoral and PS Waverley, operate seasonal cruises from Ilfracombe, including crossings to Porthcawl. However, due to rising fuel costs these services are under threat. A catamaran-based ferry service from Ilfracombe to Swansea was developed, however this service did not commence, reportedly because adequate landing and berthing facilities in Swansea have not been forthcoming.

== Education ==
The town's educational needs are served by three schools: an infants school, a junior school and the Ilfracombe Academy. Each of these schools are amongst the largest of their type in Devon. The Ilfracombe Academy serves the needs of Ilfracombe residents and those across the coastal North Devon area as far as Lynton and Lynmouth on the Somerset county boundary. It is a nationally recognised centre for Media Studies and was in 2004 awarded Media Arts Status. Upon completion of a new art block in 2007, the school's specialist status became simply arts. Further educational courses and vocational courses are run by the school.

Ilfracombe Museum was opened in 1932 in Ilfracombe Hotel's Victorian laundry and contains attractions from around the world including pickled bats and the two-headed kitten. It also contains items and photographs of local railway interest including one of the concrete name boards from the now closed local railway station, which can be seen on the front wall of the museum; and a collection of pieces of Victorian wedding cakes. It also has oak panels salvaged from the wreck of HMS Montagu.

Ilfracombe also has a library located on the Residential Candar Retirement Development.

== Landmarks ==
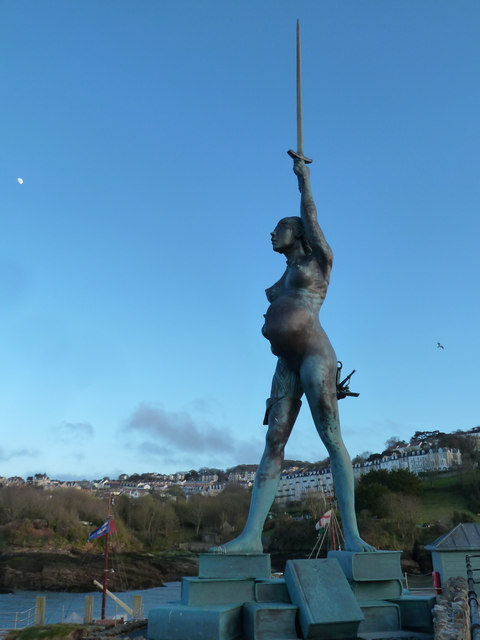
Verity by Damien Hirst

Ilfracombe has a wide variety of architectural styles dating from the 13th century to 21st century. The town has ancient streets leading to the harbour; on higher ground there are Georgian and Regency period terraces and mansions. The period from 1830 to 1900 was a time of great development and has been the subject of several books by J Bates the architecture of Ilfracombe which gives the town a Victorian flavour visible in many buildings. The latest style of architecture can be seen in the award-winning design of the Landmark Theatre.

Verity is a 2012 stainless steel and bronze statue by Damien Hirst. The 20.25-metre (66.4 ft) tall sculpture stands on the pier at the entrance to the harbour. It has been loaned to the town for 20 years. The name of the piece refers to 'truth' and Hirst describes his work as a "modern allegory of truth and justice". The statue depicts a pregnant woman holding aloft a sword while carrying the scales of justice and standing on a pile of law books. Half of the sculpture shows the internal anatomy of the pregnant woman, with the foetus visible.

=== Religious sites ===
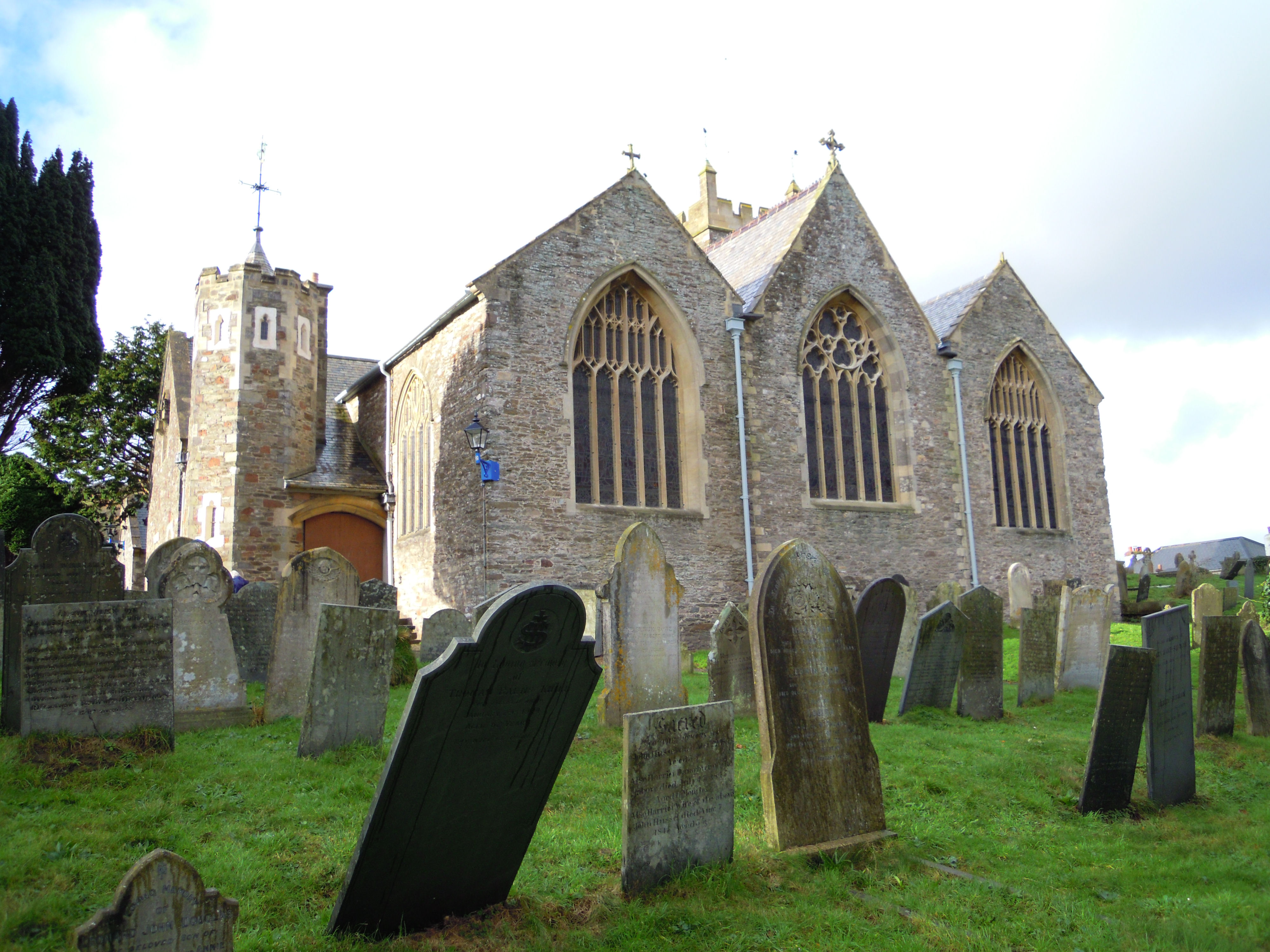
Holy Trinity is the town's parish church

Ilfracombe has churches of various Christian denominations. The main Anglican church is the parish church, Holy Trinity, which is the mother church to St Peter's on Highfield Road. Several other churches identify themselves as Evangelical, but differ in denominational background. These include: St Philip and St James Church whose background is Anglican; three free churches - Brookdale Evangelical Church and Encounter Church, of which the latter is the more charismatic and Ilfracombe Baptist Church of the Baptist tradition on the High Street. There is also the Roman Catholic Our Lady Star of the Sea Church in Runnacleave Road, the Methodist/United Reformed Emmanuel Church on Wilder Road, and the Salvation Army Corps church on Torrs Park, by Bath Place. There is a Jehovah's Witness meeting place in Victoria Road.

=== Lighthouse ===
St Nicholas's Chapel Lantern Hill
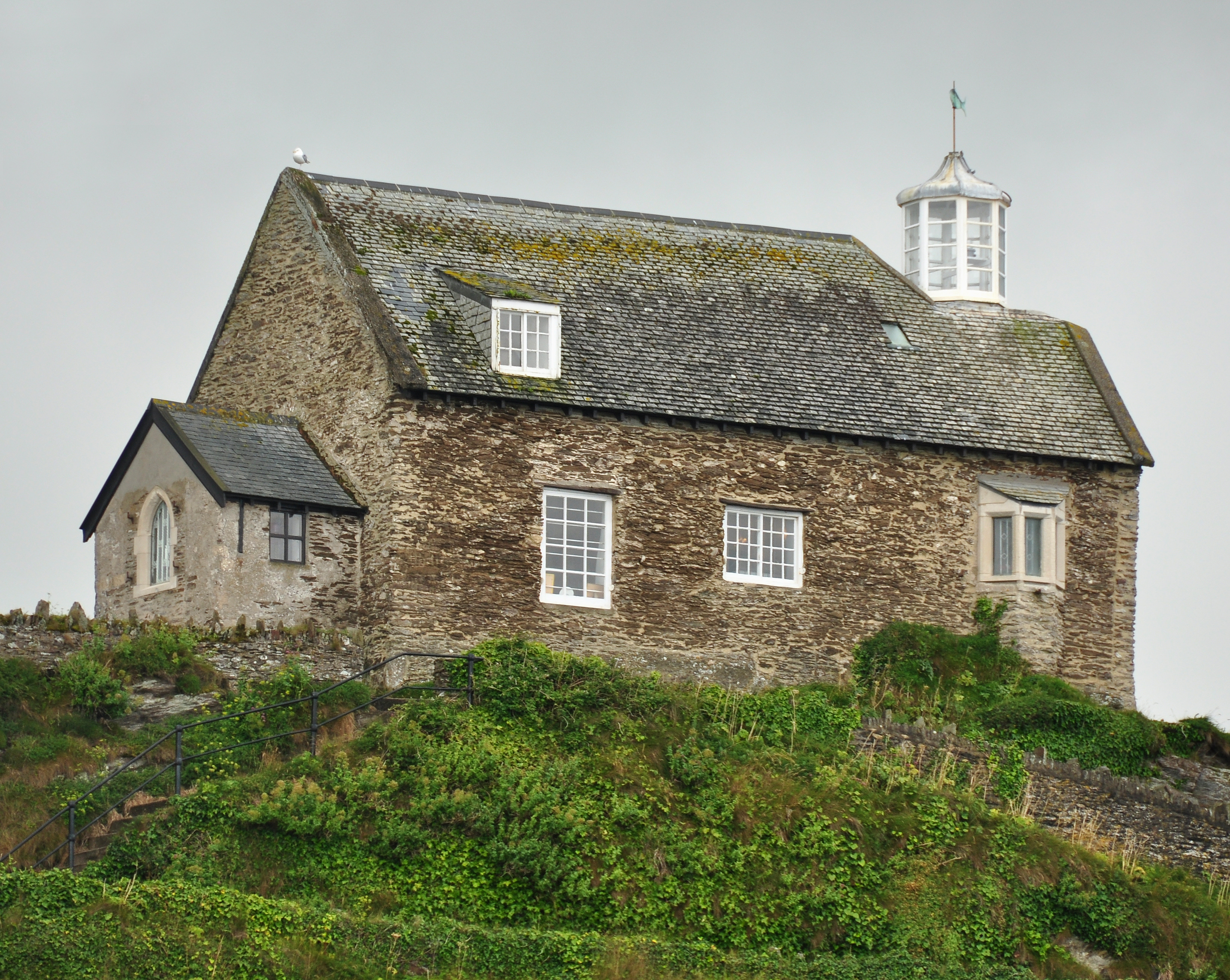
- St Nicholas's Chapel
- Location: Lantern Hill, Ilfracombe
- OS grid: SS5251247891
- Coordinates: 51.211135°N 4.113009°W

Tower
- Constructed: 1321 (first)
- Construction: stone chapel
- Height: 11 metres (36 ft)
- Markings: white lantern on the top
- Power source: mains electricity
- Operator: North Devon District Council
- Heritage: Grade I listed

Light
- First lit: 1819 (current)
- Focal height: 39 metres (128 ft)
- Range: 6 nmi (11 km; 6.9 mi)
- Characteristic: Fl G 2.5s.

Since at least the mid-17th century a light has been displayed from the 14th-century chapel atop Lantern Hill, to guide ships entering the harbour. The light remains operational, and is said to be Britain's oldest lighthouse. The current lantern was installed by Trinity House in 1819; the date is shown on a fish-shaped weather vane. The light was owned and overseen by the Lord of the manor of Ilfracombe; in the mid-19th century it was gas-powered (it used three gas burners with silvered reflectors) and displayed a fixed red light.

The light is presently operated by the harbour authority and the Grade I listed building is owned by the North Devon Council. Regular worship in the chapel ceased at the Reformation, and for a time the building served as a cottage for lighthouse keepers before falling into some dilapidation. It was restored in 1962, however, by the local Rotary Club, under whose auspices the chapel is open to visitors in the summer months.

== Sports and leisure activities ==
Ilfracombe Rugby Union Club was founded in 1877 and welcomes players from 16 to 61.

Ilfracombe Golf Club (located just beyond Hele Bay) was founded in 1892.

The Ilfracombe cricket club play at Brimlands, a site shared with the town's rugby club.

Ilfracombe Running Club was formed in 2013. They meet at Ilfracombe Town F.C. on Thursday evenings.

Ilfracombe Town Football Club, who play at Marlborough Park near The Ilfracombe Academy, compete in the Premier Division of the Western Football League.

A tennis club is based at Bicclescombe Park which contains six tennis courts.

Maritime activities include a popular yacht club and a Gig boat club with three boats which now competes in the world championships.

The South West Coast Path connecting Minehead in Somerset to Dorset, via Land's End, passes through the town from Hele Bay to Lee Bay via Ilfracombe Harbour.

The first person to swim the 30½ nautical miles (56.5 km; 35.1 mi) from Ilfracombe to Swansea was Gethin Jones, who achieved the record on 13 September 2009, taking nearly 22 hours. In 2016 Sian Clement became the first female and achieved a new fastest crossing at 14 hours 1 minute.

== Development ==
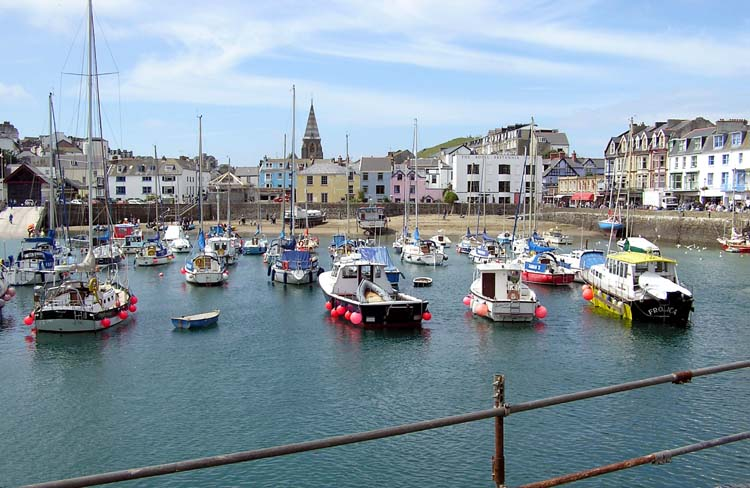
The harbour

From 2001 there was an economic regeneration programme led by the Ilfracombe & District Community Alliance MCTI, a community interest company designed to encourage social entrepreneurship. After widespread community consultation this programme developed a community economic strategy for the next twenty years published in 2005. The town council working with and North Devon District Council is formulating plans for the town's economic and physical structures. Proposed developments are: the enhancement of the harbour area; A large extension (500 dwellings) to the town on high ground to the south. There is long-term development of the derelict bus station site based on plans developed by Terence O'Rourke; and the creation of better youth support and recreation facilities at the Larkstone eastern side of the harbour area.

== Culture ==
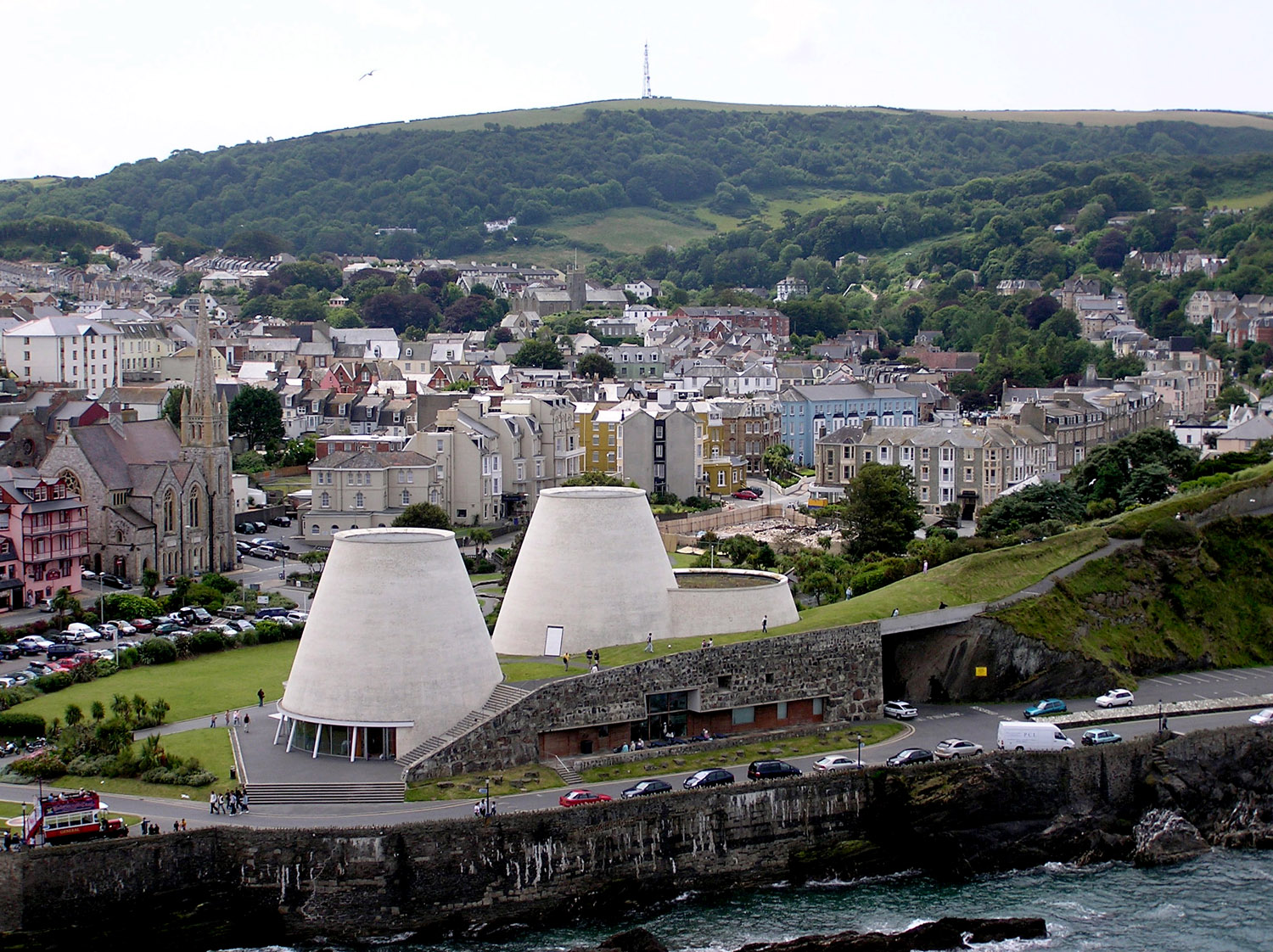
The Landmark Theatre. Emmanuel Church is on the left and the parish church is in the background

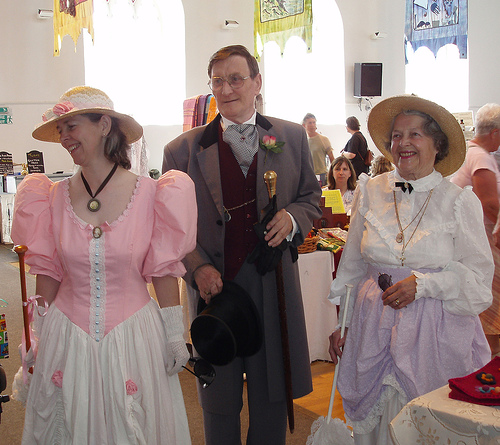
Locals enjoying 'Victorian Week' at the farmers' market whilst dressed in Victorian attire

Each year, the residents and schoolchildren of Ilfracombe celebrate their heritage. These celebrations include six carnivals – a May Day, led by a "green" man walking celebration, it is a successor to the May Day events held for centuries until suppressed by the church in the 19th century because of riotous, licentious and drunken behaviour; Ilfracombe Victorian Celebration, a week-long programme of events held annually in June to celebrate a time of the town's prosperity; a large street carnival procession during August, organised by Ilfracombe Lions; the "sea ilfracombe" festival in September and the Lighting of the Lights held during November; and at Christmas, a Christingle.

The town hosts 10 small art galleries, including the exhibitions displayed by the Art Society in their gallery in the Arcade on the seafront, the foyer of the Landmark Theatre, the Quay and in "Number Eleven, The Quay" within which there are many Damien Hirst works.

Two other charitable events are organised each summer by Ilfracombe Round Table. Both make use of Ilfracombe Pier as a display area. The first of these is the annual "South West Birdman" contest which involves entrants seeking to 'fly' from the pier in home-made flying machines. The second event is "Rescue Day", an opportunity for members of the public to learn about the activities of the emergency services.

During the early 1990s, the team of the British reality TV programme Challenge Anneka relocated the redundant old wooden library from the Hermitage site, to "Burnside" in the heart of the Slade Valley estate for use as a community-owned centre.

=== Performing arts ===
Small Pond Productions is the main theatrical group in Ilfracombe, since its inception in 2002. It produces musicals, concerts and plays throughout the year. In 2007 the group created and performed the first stage production of the Vicar of Dibley by arrangement with Richard Curtis and Tiger Aspect productions. Most recently they have produced large scale musicals at the town's Landmark Theatre.

== Climate ==
Climate data for Ilfracombe (1930–1989 averages)
Month	Jan	Feb	Mar	Apr	May	Jun	Jul	Aug	Sep	Oct	Nov	Dec	Year
Mean daily maximum °C (°F)	9 (48)	9 (48)	11 (52)	13 (55)	16 (61)	19 (66)	21 (70)	20 (68)	19 (66)	15 (59)	12 (54)	10 (50)	15 (58)
Mean daily minimum °C (°F)	4 (39)	4 (39)	4 (39)	6 (43)	8 (46)	11 (52)	13 (55)	13 (55)	11 (52)	9 (48)	6 (43)	4 (39)	8 (46)
Average precipitation mm (inches)	121.9 (4.80)	87.3 (3.44)	93.5 (3.68)	68.2 (2.69)	73.7 (2.90)	74.4 (2.93)	81.7 (3.22)	89.1 (3.51)	104.4 (4.11)	151.6 (5.97)	138.8 (5.46)	135.6 (5.34)	1,220.2 (48.05)
Mean monthly sunshine hours	50.0	72.0	130.4	175.2	213.2	221.9	199.9	194.1	143.2	97.6	57.6	43.7	1,598.8

== See also ==
- Ilfracombe Cemetery
- List of people from Ilfracombe
